= Ray Watson (broadcaster) =

American television executive

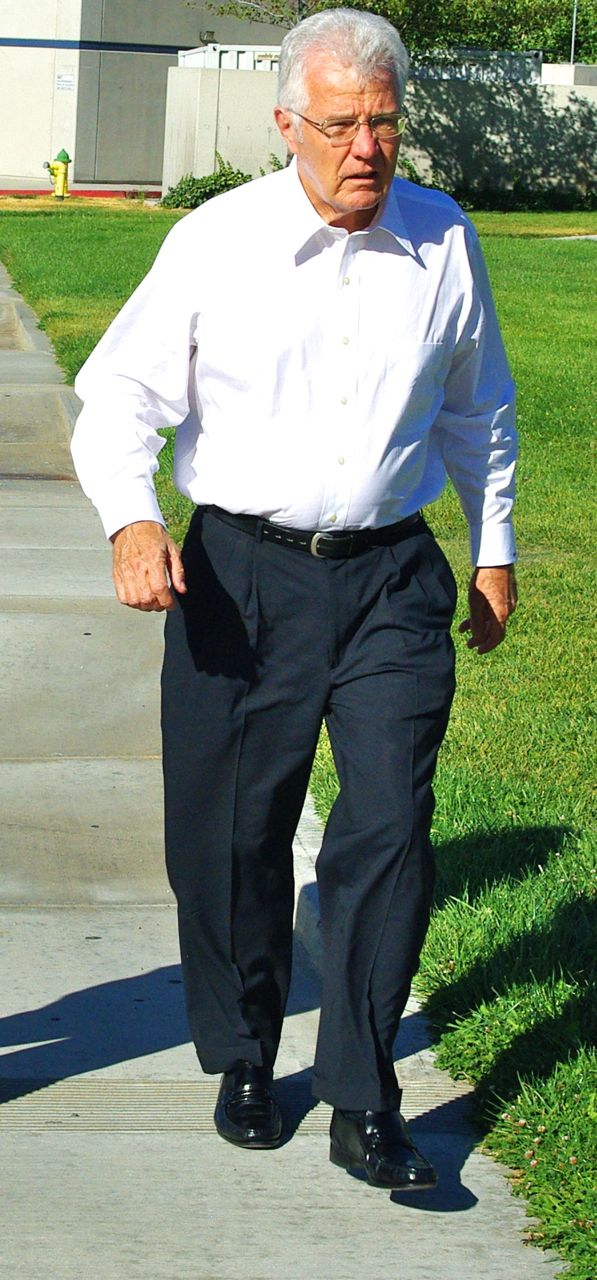
Watson at Frazier Mountain High School during a brush fire in the Mountain Communities of the Tejon Pass, August 2010

Raymond A. (Ray) Watson (born 1936) is a former American television executive who was a member of the Board of Supervisors in Kern County, California, representing the western part of the county, between November 2002 and November 2012. He was chairman of the board in 2010. Watson was named Broadcaster of the Year by the California Broadcasters Association in 2002. He was on the advisory committee of the Carrizo Plain National Monument and was a director of the San Joaquin Valley Air Pollution Control District.

== Biography ==
Watson was born in Los Angeles, California, in 1936 and moved to Kern County in 1978. He is married to Marlene Watson, and they have two grown children.

Watson graduated from the University of Southern California with a degree in accounting. He served in the United States Army Finance Corps, when he was based at Fort Irwin, California. He is a member of St. Paul's Anglican Church.

== Television experience ==
Watson was a certified public accountant with the firm of Ernst and Ernst in Los Angeles and San Diego from 1962 to 1966. He also worked in finance, administration, and personnel for Time-Life Broadcasting Company and McGraw-Hill Broadcasting Company in San Diego for nine years.

He was vice president and general manager of television stations in Bakersfield, Fresno, Santa Maria and San Luis Obispo for a total of 27 years. Watson was named Broadcaster of the Year (2002) by the California Broadcasters Association.

He was head of KERO TV-10 in Bakersfield from 1975 to 1981, then went to KMGH TV-7 in Denver, Colorado. In 1983 Watson was back in Bakersfield as vice president and general manager of KGET TV-17. He was on the board of directors of the California Broadcasters Association and the Broadcasting Financial Management Association.

KGET dedicated its downtown studio building in Watson's name upon his retirement from broadcasting in July 2002.

== Community service ==
Watson was awarded the John Brock Award by the School of Business and Public Administration at California State University, Bakersfield (CSUB), as Community Leader of the Year. Watson has been president of the Greater Bakersfield Chamber of Commerce, the Downtown Business Association, and the Bakersfield Rotary Club. He has been on the Kern Medical Center Blue Ribbon Committee and the CSUB President's Advisory Committee. He has been a board member of both the Bakersfield College and Memorial Hospital foundations, as well as the board of the Bakersfield Convention and Visitors Bureau. He is on the advisory committee of the Carrizo Plain National Monument.

He was chairman of the Employers Training Resource Private Industry Council of Kern, Inyo, and Mono Counties, Future Bakersfield Foundation, United Way of Bakersfield, Kern Transportation Foundation, and Kern View Foundation.

== Board of Supervisors ==
=== Elections ===
Watson was elected to the county Board of Supervisors in November 2002 to represent the 4th District after Supervisor Ken Peterson died in office. He was reelected in 2004.

He was elected to a third term in June 2008. He was accused by his opponent, Cliff Thompson, of "playing dirty backroom games" during the campaign. The latter claimed that Watson had told Bakersfield Mayor Harvey Hall, owner of an ambulance service, to move Hall's public relations man off Thompson's campaign team. Watson denied the charge. Watson had 11,064 votes to Thompson's 8,005. Thompson was endorsed by State Senator Dean Florez and public employee unions.

In 2010, Watson was named chairman of the board by his fellow supervisors for a one-year term.

The 4th District covers the rural, western part of the county, and in 2010 it included the towns of Lost Hills, Wasco, Buttonwillow, McKittrick, Tupman, Taft, Maricopa, Pine Mountain Club, Lebec and Frazier Park.

=== Positions ===
State powers, 2003

Watson strongly criticized State Senator Dean Florez for introducing a bill that would have banned all dairies within three miles of any school or urban area, to improve air quality. Watson said he wanted "customized buffers around cities that could be closer than three miles in some places and farther in others." He also stated that it was "a local planning issue and it should remain so. Kern County should not allow the state to usurp the authority of local governments to establish land use policies."

Public safety, 2008

Residents of Pine Mountain Club were "angered by Watson's opposition to the county paying for a permanent ambulance or firefighter paramedics in their small town in the mountains above Frazier Park."

Oil tax, 2010

Watson declared his opposition to a bill in the State Assembly by Fremont Democrat Alberto Torrico to impose a 12.5 percent severance tax on oil production. "This tax is aimed right at the heart of our economy," he said. He predicted the tax would result in the loss of 7,000 oil industry-related jobs and millions of dollars in unrealized tax receipts. Kern County produced 60 percent of the state's oil in 2010.

Maricopa annexation, 2011

He declared himself open to the county's taking over the city of Maricopa in the event it would be disincorporated. "It's sad," he said. "When you drive down the street almost all the businesses are boarded up. It could be a quaint little place, but investors would want to know that the city was going to be liquid and provide necessary services."

State prisoners, 2011

Watson said he was encouraged by a plan to retain state prisoners in county jails beginning October 1, 2011. He said he especially liked Kern County's plan to confine the prisoners to their homes with electronic monitoring and the creation of fire camps to train them as firefighters.

High-speed rail, 2012

He was one of two supervisors who voted against a successful supervisorial resolution opposing a proposed high-speed rail project through the Central Valley ""in its current form." He said he had been "involved with California's high-speed rail plan for 20 years" and believed it was needed for the "long-term health of the state."

=== Criticism ===
Watson was accused by The Californian newspaper in 2008 of having an "ivory tower style, which leaves many constituents, especially those living in outlying communities, feeling abandoned." To charges like these, of being a "drive-by supervisor," Watson responded that it was more efficient to schedule meetings back-to-back in his office than to spend time driving.

== San Joaquin Valley ==
Motor vehicle fee, 2010

As a member of the San Joaquin Valley Air Pollution Control District, Watson voted in favor of a $12-per-vehicle annual fee to fight air pollution, but only on those vehicles registered in the Valley. Activists complained that Valley vehicles contributed only 9 percent of the ozone problem, but Watson said that "I think $1 a month from vehicle owners is not too much to ask, especially if it prevents businesses from shutting down because they can't afford to pay the penalty."

Altamont mitigation, 2011

Watson commented adversely on an agreement between the San Joaquin Valley Air Pollution Control District and the developers of a power plant in Alameda County, near Livermore, by which the developer would pay $200,000 to the district in mitigation of pollution that would be blown into the San Joaquin Valley by the predominantly easterly winds over the Altamont Pass. The funds would be used to upgrade farmers' diesel pumps or replace their trucks or tractors, among other possibilities. "Those engines will be purchased and we will get no gain out of it," he said.

== See also ==
- Frazier Mountain Municipal Advisory Council controversy
