= Castac Valley =

Valley in Kern County, California

- Valley
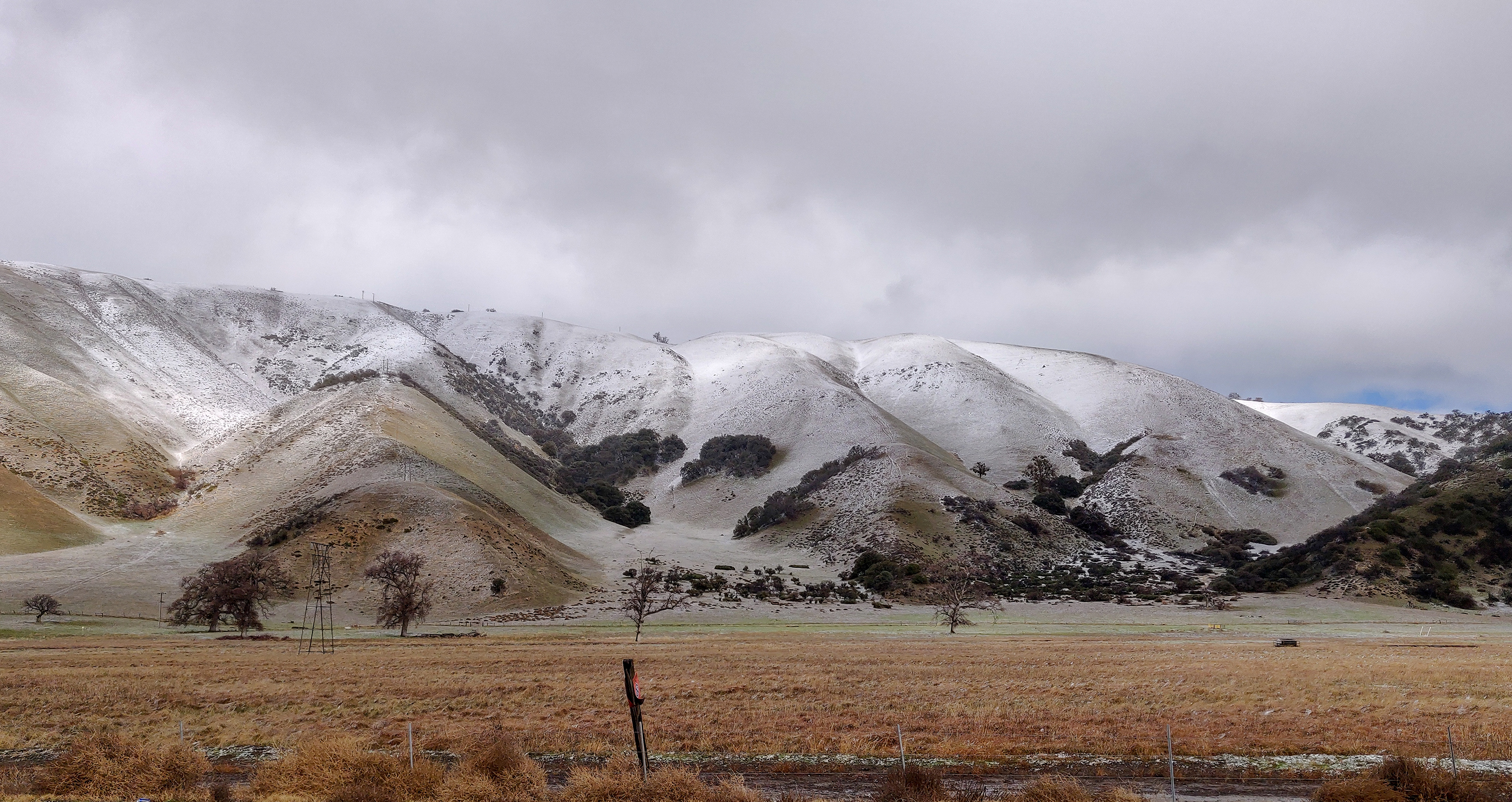
- Southwestern slopes of the Tehachapi Mountains in Castac Valley

- Coordinates: 34°50′12″N 118°51′50″W
- Location: Kern County, California
- Range: Transverse Ranges
- Formed by: San Andreas Fault
- Elevation: 883 m (2,897 ft)

Castac Valley is a valley located within the Transverse Ranges in southern Kern County, California. The unincorporated community of Lebec is located within the western portion of the valley.

== Geography ==
Castac Valley is located between the eastern slopes of the San Emigdio Mountains and the southwestern tip of the Tehachapi Mountains. Castac Valley is connected to Cuddy Canyon to the west, Peace Valley via Tejon Pass to the south, and Grapevine Canyon to the north. The eastern portion of the valley is dominated by Castac Lake, a shallow endorheic lake.

Castac Valley is part of the San Andreas Rift System.

== See also ==
- Mountain communities of the Tejon Pass
- Hungry Valley
