= El Tejon Unified School District =

School district in California, United States

Address
- 4337 Lebec Road Lebec, California, 93243; United States

District information
- Type: Public
- Grades: TK–12
- NCES District ID: 0600026

Students and staff
- Students: 740
- Teachers: 34
- Staff: 150
- Student–teacher ratio: 20.33

Other information
- Website: www.el-tejon.k12.ca.us

The El Tejon Unified School District serves kindergarten-through-12th-grade students in the Mountain Communities of the Tejon Pass, which include Frazier Park, Lebec, and Pine Mountain Club in the southern mountains of Kern County, California. Lockwood Valley is part of the district even though it is within Ventura County, and Gorman students (in Los Angeles County) are accepted into the high school by special permit.

== Schools ==
=== Grades K-8 ===
Frazier Park Elementary School educates children in kindergarten through fourth grade. El Tejon Middle School in Lebec takes district students from fifth through the eighth grade.

=== Frazier Mountain High School ===
Frazier Mountain High School, also in Lebec, was founded in 1995 for ninth- through 12th-graders.

==== Academics ====
The Frazier Mountain High School curriculum offers college prep, honors and advanced placement (AP) courses. Beginning in the fall of 2013, they also began offering dual enrollment courses for English and Chemistry. Students enrolled in these courses receive both college credit and credit toward high school graduation. The school also hosts a "school within a school" via a California Partnership Academy, which accommodates the needs of both "at-risk" students and those who are college bound in team-oriented learning, project-based instruction and cross-discipline thematics.

==== Activities ====
Clubs and activities include art, baton, cheer, California Scholarship Federation, drumline, Future Farmers of America, Friends of Rachel, Student School Ambassadors, and others.

==== Athletics ====
Frazier Mountain High School belongs to the High Desert League in the Central Section of the California Interscholastic Federation. Prior to fall 2013, the school and the High Desert League had competed in the Southern Section of the CIF. The teams, known as the Falcons, compete in baseball, basketball, football, golf, soccer, softball and volleyball. 2013 proved to be a stellar year for FMHS athletics. The 2013 Varsity Football team and the 2013 Varsity Softball team both made it to the first round of playoffs. The 2013 Varsity Girls' Soccer team finished league 10-0 and contended in playoffs. The 2013 FMHS baseball team finished their league play undefeated and won the High Desert League championship for the first time in the school's history. Additionally, the baseball team made it to the third round of playoffs before they were defeated.

==== Robotics ====
In 2001, the National Aeronautics and Space Administration awarded the school a sponsorship to compete in a robotics competition. Then in 2004 it won a robotics competition in Southern California. In 2013, the FMHS Robotics team "Snobotics" placed 2nd at the 2013 LA Regional competition.

==== Intelligent design class ====
In 2006, Frazier Mountain High School received national attention in the case Hurst et al. v. Newman et al. when eleven parents sued the district for its scheduling an intersession course on "The Philosophy of Design." The class, taught by Sharon Lemburg, who was married to an Assembly of God pastor, was criticized for bringing intelligent design creationism into the class. Lemburg was accused by Ken Hurst, one of the parents who filed the lawsuit and is a researcher at the Jet Propulsion Laboratory in La Canada, for falsely including him and Nobel Prize winner Francis Crick (who had been dead for two years) as lecturers on the syllabus presented to the Board of Trustees. The suit was settled out of court when the school district agreed that no school "shall offer, presently or in the future, the course entitled 'Philosophy of Design' or 'Philosophy of Intelligent Design' or any other course that promotes or endorses creationism, creation science, or intelligent design."

==== Missing student body funds ====
On October 14, 2009, the school board heard the results of an audit of the books of the Associated Student Body organization for the school year 2008-2009, when revenues were $224,012 from dances, a student store, and athletic events and expenses were $201,301. The audit was ordered after two students complained about what they said were missing funds amounting to about $10,000. It found a deficiency in the student books and "lack of controls," County Assistant Superintendent of Schools Mark Fulmer told the board.

In the wake of an investigation by Jason Kaff of the Kern County Superintendent of Schools office, School District Board Chairman Anita Anderson told an Enterprise reporter in June 2010 that "Kids raised the money and then the money was used for other purposes." But the school district put new procedures in place to avoid irregularities in the future, the newspaper reported, "such as taking regular inventories in the student store, immediately counting and filing cash reports signed by two people following fundraising events, reconciling bank statements . . . and keeping mandated files of signed minutes to document that [Associated Student Body] members agreed to purchases."

==== Student walkout ====
About two hundred high school students staged a walkout from their classes on January 25, 2011, to protest the layoff of bus driver Jesus "Chuy" Saldana after a parent complained that the bus he was driving rolled backward and caused her to run over her son's foot with her car. "They chanted, 'Chuy, Chuy,' and interviewed with local and television media before the media was shooed away by administrators." The Mountain Enterprise contacted the California Newspaper Publishers Association about the alleged interference with the media and was told that the students have the right to "speak to the media and express their opinions."

=== Charter schools ===
Frazier Park hosts a branch of the Charter Oaks Community Charter School, headquartered in Bakersfield. The charter school is designed to "provide opportunities, support, and accountability for parents in their homeschooling endeavors."

Pine Mountain Learning Center is a district-sponsored charter school 3.5 miles west of Pine Mountain.

=== Home schooling ===
Home schooling is important in the Mountain Communities, according to a March 2008 report in the local weekly newspaper, The Mountain Enterprise, which added:

Per capita, the Mountain Communities may have one of the highest rates of homeschooling in the state, far above the national average of 2 to 4 percent, Holly Van Houten . . . [a home-school parent of the area] said. Estimates range between 8 and 30 percent—somewhere between 100 and 400 children, she reports.

== Administration ==
As of August 2024 the administrative staff of El Tejon district consists of:

- Sara Haflich, Superintendent
- Mike Vogenthaler, Principal, Frazier Mountain High School
- Corey Hansen, Principal, El Tejon Middle School
- Michael McNelis, Principal, Frazier Park Elementary School
