= Cuddy Valley, California =

Rift valley within the San Emigdio Mountains of California

Cuddy Valley
- Valley
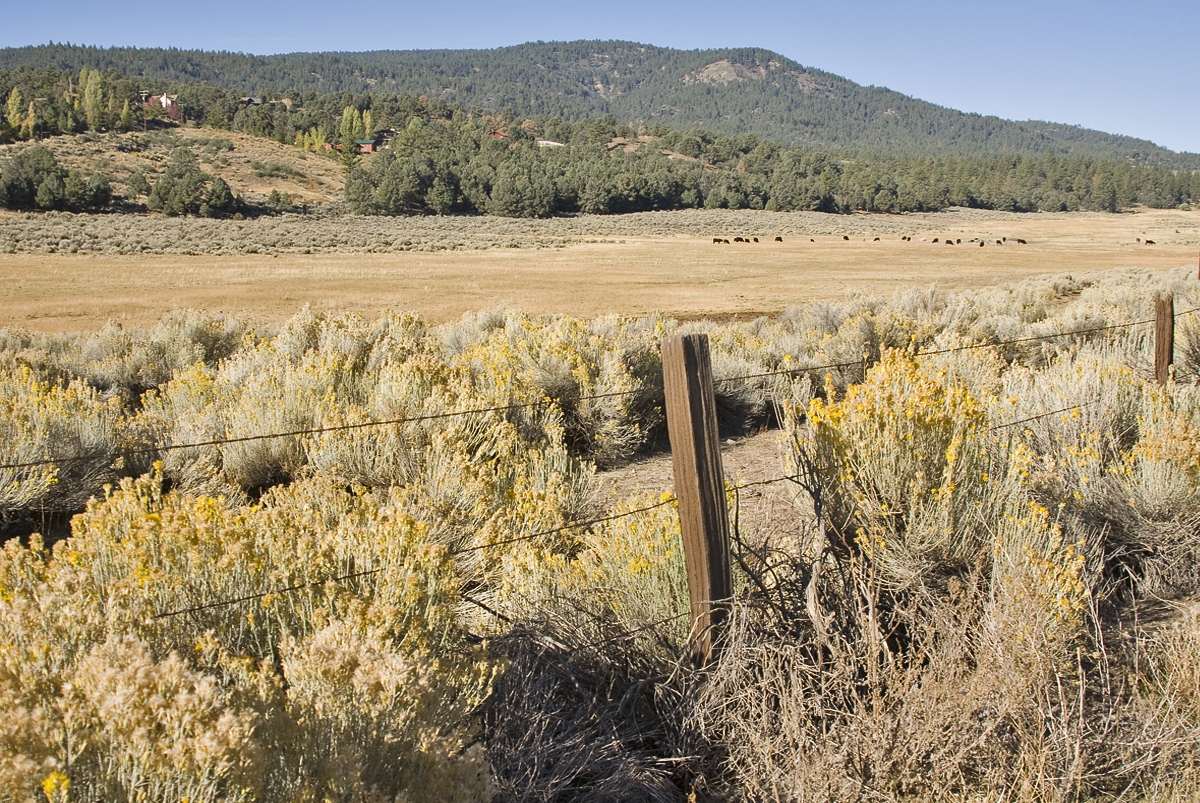
- Cuddy Valley

- Location within California
- Coordinates: 34°49′27″N 119°01′23″W
- Location: Kern County, California
- Range: Transverse Ranges
- Formed by: San Andreas Fault

Cuddy Valley is a valley in the San Andreas Rift Zone south of the San Emigdio Mountains west of Tejon Pass, part of the Mountain Communities. It lies at an elevation of 5,282 feet 1610 m).

== History ==
What is now the Cuddy Valley was a water and grazing place along El Camino Viejo (18th-19th century). The Old Road came over what is now the Tejon Pass from what would become Gorman then turned west up Cuddy Creek to Cuddy Valley its spring. Afterward the road descended to the north, through the San Emigdio Mountains, via San Emigdio Canyon along San Emigdio Creek to the San Joaquin Valley. At the foot of the mountains and at the creek's mouth was the next stop, that became the 1842 Mexican land grant of Rancho San Emidio.

=== John Fletcher Cuddy ===
Cuddy Valley, Cuddy Creek and Cuddy Canyon are named for John Fletcher Cuddy, who came to the United States from Ireland during the Great Famine. He joined the United States Army and after being discharged in 1853, followed his former unit, the 1st Dragoon Regiment, to Fort Tejon in 1854 as a civilian teamster. He became the herdsman for the fort and found meadow in a valley some miles west of the fort that was ideal for grazing its stock.

Cuddy eventually built a log cabin west of the fort in the small valley just southwest of modern Lake of the Woods, and laid claim to land in what became known at the time as Cuddy's Valley, (later Little Cuddy Valley), and raised cattle there. John Cuddy married Margaret Gale in 1858 and by 1861 had moved his family into a larger log cabin that still stands, west of the present community of Lake of the Woods.

The Cuddy Ranch acquired much of the surrounding area as Cuddy's children became eligible, homesteading nearby land until their holdings included most of the land, to the southwest in Lockwood Valley, to the west in what is now known as Cuddy Valley, and east to the present Interstate 5.

== See also ==
- Cuddy Canyon
