= Lake of the Woods, California =

Lake of the Woods
- Unincorporated Community; Census Designated Place
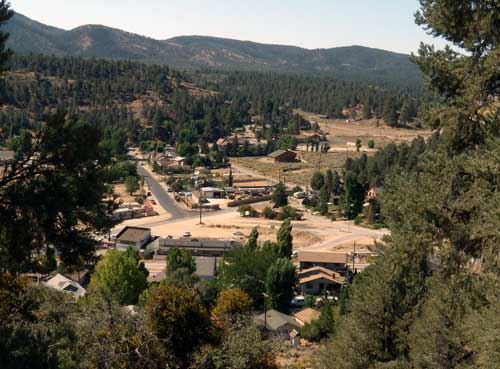
- Lake of the Woods, with Lockwood Valley Road and Lakewood Drive in the center. The buildings at bottom front on Frazier Mountain Park Road.

- Location of Lake of the Woods in Kern County, California

- Location in Southern California Location in California Location in the United States
- Coordinates: 34°49′03″N 118°59′47″W
- Country: United States
- State: California
- County: Kern

Government
  - State Senator: Shannon Grove (R)
  - Assemblymember: Stan Ellis (R)
  - U. S. Congress: Vince Fong (R)

Area
  - Total: 3.540 sq mi (9.168 km^{2})
  - Land: 3.539 sq mi (9.167 km^{2})
  - Water: 0.00077 sq mi (0.002 km^{2}) 0.002%
- Elevation: 5,121 ft (1,561 m)

Population (2020)
  - Total: 790
  - Density: 220/sq mi (86/km^{2})
- Time zone: UTC-8 (Pacific (PST))
  - Summer (DST): UTC-7 (PDT)
- FIPS code: 06-39696

Lake of the Woods is an unincorporated area and census-designated place (CDP) in southwestern Kern County, California, United States. As of the 2020 census, the population was 790.

The community is in Cuddy Canyon in the San Emigdio Mountains, along the Ventura and Kern County line. It is within the Los Padres National Forest.

The name "Lake of the Woods" was bestowed by pioneer Mrs. Florence Cuddy, when the community was established in 1925. The reservoir for which it was named has been dry since 1962, when its dam burst.

Lake of the Woods is centrally located in the mountain communities. It offers county maintained paved roads, no property or homeowners' associations, several local hiking trails and full utility services from Southern California Edison, SoCalGas, Lake of the Woods Mutual Water Company and Mountainside Trash Service.

== Demographics ==
Historical population
| Census | Pop. | Note | %± |
|---|---|---|---|
| 2000 | 833 | | — |
| 2010 | 917 | | 10.1% |
| 2020 | 790 | | −13.8% |
U.S. Decennial Census; 1860–1870 1880-1890; 1900 1910 1920; 1930 1940 1950; 1960 1970 1980; 1990 2000 2010; 2020

Lake of the Woods first appeared as a census designated place in the 2000 U.S. census.

=== 2020 ===
Lake of the Woods CDP, California – Racial and ethnic composition Note: the US Census treats Hispanic/Latino as an ethnic category. This table excludes Latinos from the racial categories and assigns them to a separate category. Hispanics/Latinos may be of any race.
| Race / Ethnicity (NH = Non-Hispanic) | Pop 2000 | Pop 2010 | Pop 2020 | % 2000 | % 2010 | % 2020 |
|---|---|---|---|---|---|---|
| White alone (NH) | 691 | 753 | 574 | 82.95% | 82.12% | 72.66% |
| Black or African American alone (NH) | 0 | 3 | 3 | 0.00% | 0.33% | 0.38% |
| Native American or Alaska Native alone (NH) | 18 | 15 | 9 | 2.16% | 1.64% | 1.14% |
| Asian alone (NH) | 16 | 11 | 8 | 1.92% | 1.20% | 1.01% |
| Native Hawaiian or Pacific Islander alone (NH) | 1 | 0 | 2 | 0.12% | 0.00% | 0.25% |
| Other race alone (NH) | 1 | 0 | 1 | 0.12% | 0.00% | 0.13% |
| Mixed race or Multiracial (NH) | 18 | 12 | 31 | 2.16% | 1.31% | 3.92% |
| Hispanic or Latino (any race) | 88 | 123 | 162 | 10.56% | 13.41% | 20.51% |
| Total | 833 | 917 | 790 | 100.00% | 100.00% | 100.00% |

=== 2010 ===
The 2010 United States census reported that Lake of the Woods had a population of 917. The population density was 260.3 inhabitants per square mile (100.5/km^{2}). The racial makeup of Lake of the Woods was 820 (89.4%) White, 3 (0.3%) African American, 18 (2.0%) Native American, 11 (1.2%) Asian, 0 (0.0%) Pacific Islander, 34 (3.7%) from other races, and 31 (3.4%) from two or more races. Hispanic or Latino of any race were 123 persons (13.4%).

The Census reported that 917 people (100% of the population) lived in households, 0 (0%) lived in non-institutionalized group quarters, and 0 (0%) were institutionalized.

There were 405 households, out of which 107 (26.4%) had children under the age of 18 living in them, 188 (46.4%) were opposite-sex married couples living together, 29 (7.2%) had a female householder with no husband present, 24 (5.9%) had a male householder with no wife present. There were 22 (5.4%) unmarried opposite-sex partnerships, and 1 (0.2%) same-sex married couples or partnerships. 140 households (34.6%) were made up of individuals, and 52 (12.8%) had someone living alone who was 65 years of age or older. The average household size was 2.26. There were 241 families (59.5% of all households); the average family size was 2.95.

The population was spread out, with 182 people (19.8%) under the age of 18, 75 people (8.2%) aged 18 to 24, 192 people (20.9%) aged 25 to 44, 348 people (37.9%) aged 45 to 64, and 120 people (13.1%) who were 65 years of age or older. The median age was 45.7 years. For every 100 females there were 113.3 males. For every 100 females age 18 and over, there were 113.7 males.

There were 480 housing units at an average density of 136.3 per square mile (52.6/km^{2}), of which 274 (67.7%) were owner-occupied, and 131 (32.3%) were occupied by renters. The homeowner vacancy rate was 2.8%; the rental vacancy rate was 7.1%. 594 people (64.8% of the population) lived in owner-occupied housing units and 323 people (35.2%) lived in rental housing units.

=== 2000 ===
As of the census of 2000, there were 833 people, 346 households, and 217 families in Lake of the Woods, 88 percent of the residents being white — significantly higher than the population of the United States as a whole — which has a population about 75 percent white. There were no African-Americans included in the Lake of the Woods census.

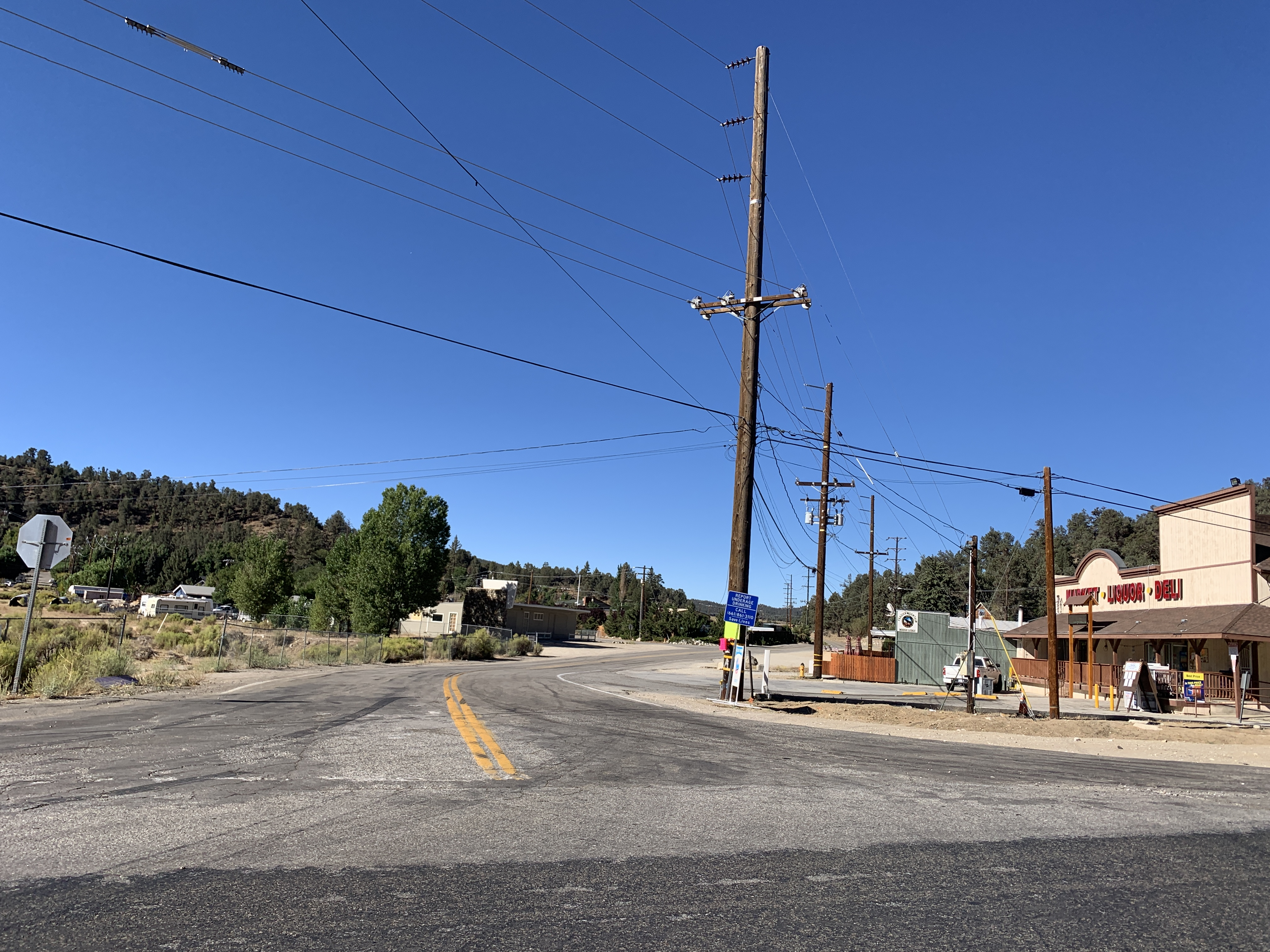
The center of Lake of the Woods

The population was somewhat older than the country as a whole, the median age being 39 years in Lake of the Woods and 35 years elsewhere. The community had a higher percentage of veterans: One hundred sixteen residents had served in the armed forces, or 20 percent, compared with 13 percent in the rest of the country. Thirty-eight percent of all residents, or 305 people, were disabled; that is higher than the 19 percent disabled population in the country at large.

In common with some of the other Mountain Communities of the Tejon Pass, Lake of the Woods had a significant vacancy rate when the census was taken in March 2000 — 129 of the 475 housing units were unoccupied, compared with just 9 percent in the nation at large. The vacancies may be attributed to some homes' being used only seasonally, or on the weekends.

== Transportation ==
Kern Regional Transit provides bus service to Lake of the Woods Thursdays and Saturdays during the summer to Frazier Park, Lebec, Pinon Pines, and Pine Mountain Club. It offers a dial-a-ride service all year. Connections can be made in Frazier Park or Lebec to a scheduled service to Grapevine and Bakersfield and further connection from the latter to Greyhound and Amtrak.

Road access from the east is provided by Frazier Mountain Park Road, which connects Lake of the Woods to Frazier Park, Lebec, and Interstate 5. Cuddy Valley Road heads west to Pinon Pines and Pine Mountain Club.

== Public facilities ==
Lake of the Woods is served by the Frazier Park post office.

Cuddy Hall, owned by the local Lake of the Woods property owners association, is a community center that is available to the public. It was sold to the association in 1959 by Mrs. Cuddy for just $10. It is used as a polling place and is rented out for weddings, parties, concerts, and other events.

== See also ==
- The Mountain Enterprise newspaper
- Mountain Communities of the Tejon Pass
- 1857 Fort Tejon earthquake

== Sources ==
- Bailey, Richard C., Kern County Place Names, (Bakersfield, California: Merchant's Printing and Lithography Co., 1967).
- US Geological Survey 7.5-minute quadrangle, "Frazier Mountain, California" (1995).

== Newspapers ==
- The Mountain Enterprise
- Bakersfield Californian The Californian discontinued circulation in the Mountain Communities effective May 1, 2009. Source: Mountain Enterprise, April 3, 2009
