= Cuddy Canyon =

Canyon within the San Emigdio Mountains of California

- Canyon
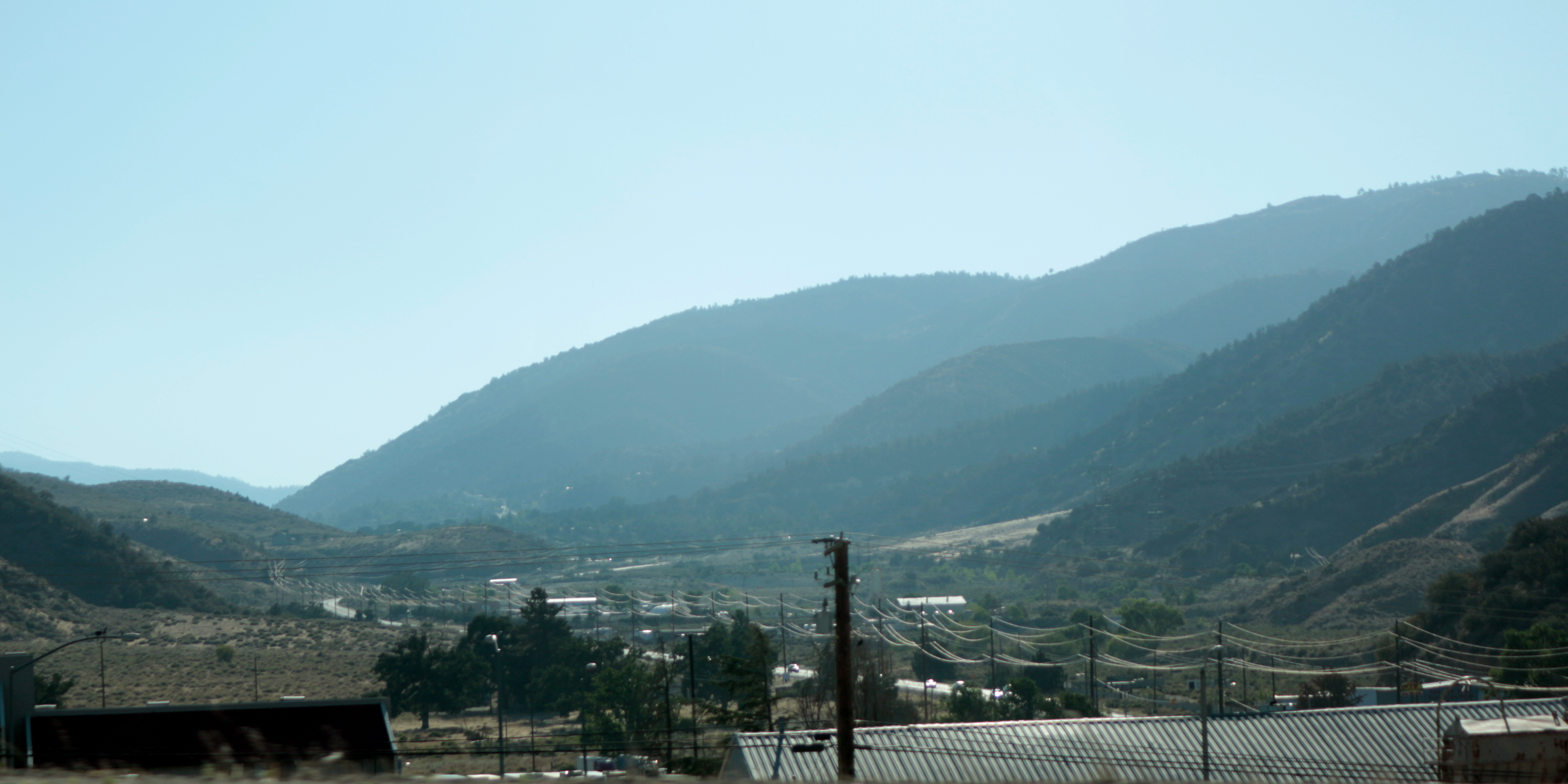
- The canyon, viewed from Interstate 5 to the east; part of Lebec can be seen along Frazier Mountain Park Road

- Location within California
- Coordinates: 34°49′05″N 118°53′05″W
- Location: Kern County and Ventura County
- Range: Transverse Ranges

Cuddy Canyon is a canyon running along the boundary line between Kern County and Ventura County, California. It lies inside the Los Padres National Forest and southern San Emigdio Mountains.

The canyon includes the Tejon Pass mountain communities of Frazier Park, and Lake of the Woods. For purposes of the census-designated places only, none of the sparsely populated Cuddy Valley that lies within Ventura County are included for the statistics for Frazier Park or Lake of the Woods.

== History ==
The 18th-19th century El Camino Viejo passed through the valley canyon, between the Los Angeles Basin and San Francisco Bay Area missions and settlements. Cuddy Canyon was named for John Fletcher Cuddy who settled and ranched in the canyon and in Cuddy Valley.

== See also ==
- Peace Valley
- Hungry Valley
