= The Mountain Enterprise =

Newspaper in Frazier Park, California

- Type: Weekly newspaper
- Owner(s): Hometown Publishing, LLC
- Founded: September 22, 1966; 60 years ago
- Language: English
- City: Frazier Park, California
- Country: United States
- Website: mountainenterprise.com

The Mountain Enterprise is a weekly newspaper published since 1966, circulating in the Mountain Communities of the Tejon Pass east and west of the Grapevine section of the Interstate 5 in the San Emigdio Mountains region of California, midway between Los Angeles and Bakersfield.

== Coverage area ==
The newspaper's 600-square-mile (1,600 km^{2}) coverage area spans northern Los Angeles County, eastern Ventura County, and southwestern Kern County, including the developments of the 270,000-acre (110,000 ha) Tejon Ranch property, the Western Antelope Valley, Gorman, Lebec, Frazier Park, Lake of the Woods, Lockwood Valley, Cuddy Valley and the Pine Mountain Club community.

== Ownership ==
The first edition of The Mountain Enterprise was issued on September 22, 1966, by Nedra Hawley Cooper as a mimeographed, hand-stapled and hand-drawn publication; its first editions were produced on a blue Royal typewriter now housed at the Ridge Route Communities Museum & Historical Society. Fred Kiesner was editor from 1973 to 1976.

Keith Nelson, superintendent of Ridgelite Products, and Kitty Jo Nelson, a teacher, purchased the business from Neil Keyzers in 1985. The Nelsons sold it to Bob Weisburg and Morrie Prizer in 1995.

In 2000, a coalition of local residents and business owners purchased The Mountain Enterprise and the then-monthly publication, The Mountain Pioneer, from Weisburg and Prizer.

In late 2004 the management and majority shareholdings of Hometown Publishing, LLC and its publications The Mountain Enterprise and The Mountain Pioneer plus the Mountain Communities Phone Book was assumed by Gary Meyer (publisher) and Patric Hedlund (editor). In November 2006 ownership of all shares in Hometown Publishing was taken over by Meyer, Hedlund and Pam Sturdevant, with general management continuing under Meyer and Hedlund. In 2014 ownership passed to Meyer and Hedlund when they purchased Sturdevant's shares.

In 2024, the newspaper came under new ownership with management by local resident Daniel Schwartz. As of July 2026, it is published weekly in a tabloid format of between 20 and 24 pages, and on its website www.mountainenterprise.com.

== Awards ==
In 2006, The Mountain Enterprise won three statewide awards for (1) a series of investigative reports about paramedic-ambulance services throughout the mountain communities, (2) a series of investigative reports about the environmental effects from a proposed housing development called Frazier Park Estates, and (3) Best Website for the online services provided to the community at www. MountainEnterprise.com.

In 2009, the newspaper won four national awards on July 10 for (1) a series of investigative reports on the starvation of horses in Lockwood Valley, (2) reporting on the struggle by Pine Mountain Club residents to secure Kern County's first firefighter-paramedic program, (3) Editorial Writing about the newspaper's public-service responsibility in "The Stinkin' Public and Our School District's Brain Drain," by Patric Hedlund, and (4) an environmental story headed "Secret Negotiation between Tejon Developers and 'Big Green' Groups Sprouts Deal".

In 2015, the newspaper won a statewide award for its editorial "Brought to you compliments of AB109: Convicted burglar returns to the mountain".

== Controversies ==
=== Grand Jury criticism ===
In 2010, the newspaper was the target of criticism by the Kern County Grand Jury for its coverage of a controversy regarding the destruction of heritage oak trees during the construction of a new Frazier Park county library. A jury committee said a "lack of communication" was responsible for the controversy and blamed that circumstance on "the people of the area and their newspaper," adding that The Enterprise news articles "appear to be inaccurate and/or inadequately researched." The Mountain Enterprise responded citing three statements made in the jury's report that The Enterprise says were false, and stating that the county's own arborist had told The Mountain Enterprise that the Grand Jury had not contacted him to corroborate the three claims made in the report. In an editorial, Meyer and Hedlund wrote that the jury made no attempt to contact them before issuing the report, which, they said, "attacks the citizens and the newspaper . . . with statements that are shocking in their shallowness. The publisher of The Mountain Enterprise observed that (1) the newspaper had laid the disturbing facts about the killing of the oak trees at the feet of Kern County Supervisor Ray Watson, who then called the paper in a fit of rage about the accusations, and (2) the newspaper, through a public information request, determined that Kern County's Grand Jury receives its funding at the discretion of the county supervisors, which, at the time, included Ray Watson.

=== Defamation accusation ===
In 2006, Pine Mountain resident David Seidner filed a lawsuit against The Mountain Enterprise for defamation, citing stories published in the newspaper during the 2005 campaign for the Pine Mountain Club Property Owners Association Board of Directors. Seidner's preferred candidates lost the election and he claimed that The Mountain Enterprise had made untrue statements about him in the course of its reporting about the campaign issues. Seidner also had claimed that the publisher and the editor of the newspaper (Gary Meyer and Patric Hedlund) had tampered with the ballot box in the election. The Mountain Enterprise filed an Anti-SLAPP motion to strike with the court which required Seidner to demonstrate that his arguments had merit or risk paying the newspaper's attorney's fees. The suit was dropped immediately.
