= California Broadcasters Association =

The California Broadcasters Association represents radio and television stations in California. It has sponsored debates between California gubernatorial candidates.

Stan Statham is the president and chief executive officer of the organization, which is headquartered in Sacramento.
