= Lebec, California =

- Unincorporated Community; Census Designated Place
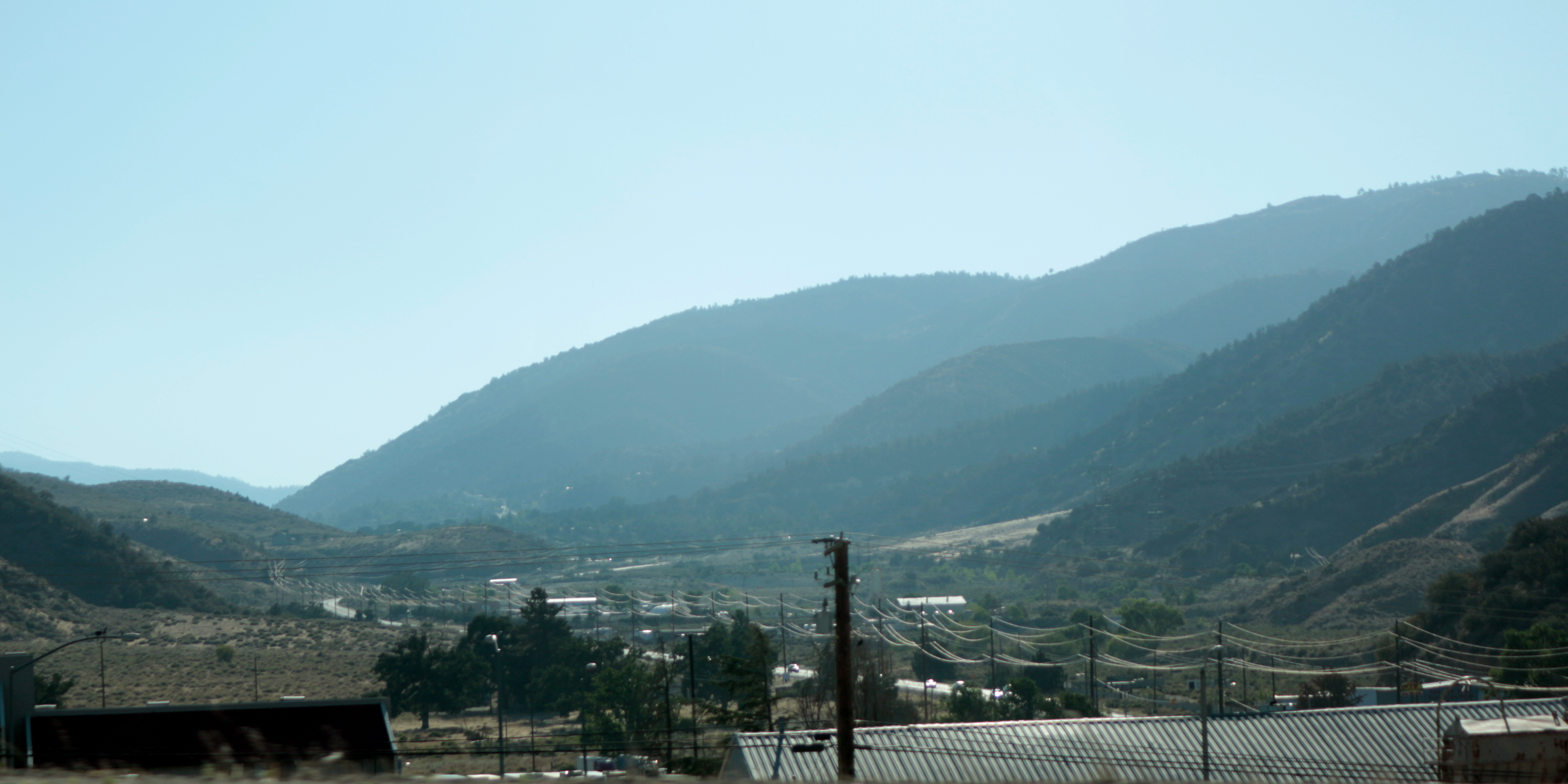
- Lebec as seen from I-5 southbound in 2021

- Location of Lebec in Kern County, California

- Location in Southern California Location in California Location in the United States
- Coordinates: 34°50′32.43″N 118°51′56.01″W
- Country: United States
- State: California
- County: Kern

Government
  - County supervisor: Chris Parlier
  - Assemblymember: Stan Ellis (R)
  - State Senator: Shannon Grove (R)
  - U. S. Congress: Vince Fong (R)

Area
  - Total: 15.324 sq mi (39.689 km^{2})
  - Land: 15.324 sq mi (39.690 km^{2})
  - Water: 0.00039 sq mi (0.001 km^{2}) 0.002%
- Elevation: 3,481 ft (1,061 m)

Population (2020)
  - Total: 1,239
  - Density: 80.85/sq mi (31.22/km^{2})
- Time zone: UTC−8 (PST)
  - Summer (DST): UTC−7 (PDT)
- ZIP Code: 93243
- Area code: 661
- FIPS code: 06-40956

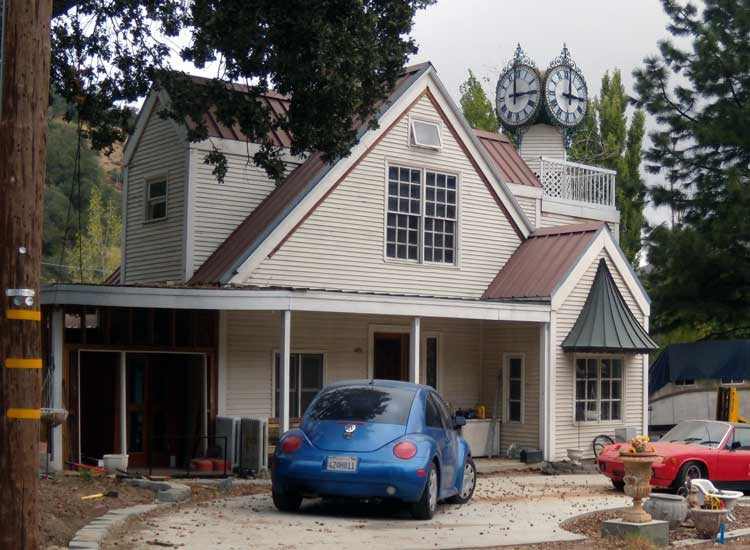
A distinctive residential house in Lebec

Lebec is an unincorporated community and census-designated place in southwestern Kern County, California, United States. As of the 2020 census, the population was 1,239.

== Geography ==
Lebec is located in Castac Valley between the San Emigdio and Tehachapi Mountains. The community is one of the Mountain Communities of the Tejon Pass.

Lebec is 40 miles (64 km) south of Bakersfield.

According to the United States Census Bureau, Lebec has an area of 15.3 square miles (40 km^{2}). The community, which is near Tejon Pass, lies at an elevation of 3,481 feet (1,061 m).

== History ==
Lebec is named in honor of Peter Lebeck (or Lebecque), a French trapper killed by a grizzly bear in 1837 in the area that later became Fort Tejon. He was memorialized in an epitaph at the site, found carved in a bare spot on an old oak tree. The epitaph read PETER LEBECK / KILLED BY A X BEAR / OCTR 17 / 1837. The bark of the oak tree eventually grew over the carving. A group from Bakersfield, called the Foxtail Rangers, removed the bark in the late 19th century and found the inscription in reverse on its underside. The piece is now displayed in the museum at Fort Tejon State Historic Park.

Lieutenant R.S. Williamson camped at the same oak grove in 1853 while on a mid-1850s mapping mission for a practicable railway route from the Mississippi River to the Pacific Ocean. Geologist William P. Blake accompanied Williamson's party. The area was garrisoned by the United States Army a year later, on August 10, 1854, as Fort Tejon, the first military fort in the California interior. The fort suffered extensive damage during the 1857 Fort Tejon earthquake.

The first post office opened in 1895, having been transferred there from Tejon.

The Lebec Hotel was a large Spanish Colonial Revival-style hotel located on the Ridge Route in the community. It was built in 1921, and was popular with Hollywood executives and movie stars before World War II. It closed in 1968, and was demolished in 1971.

== Demographics ==
Historical population
| Census | Pop. | Note | %± |
|---|---|---|---|
| 2000 | 1,224 | | — |
| 2010 | 1,468 | | 19.9% |
| 2020 | 1,239 | | −15.6% |
U.S. Decennial Census; 1860–1870 1880-1890; 1900 1910 1920; 1930 1940 1950; 1960 1970 1980; 1990 2000 2010; 2020

Lebec first appeared as a census designated place in the 2000 U.S. census.

=== Racial and ethnic composition ===
Lebec CDP, California – Racial and ethnic composition Note: the US Census treats Hispanic/Latino as an ethnic category. This table excludes Latinos from the racial categories and assigns them to a separate category. Hispanics/Latinos may be of any race.
| Race / Ethnicity (NH = Non-Hispanic) | Pop 2000 | Pop 2010 | Pop 2020 | % 2000 | % 2010 | % 2020 |
|---|---|---|---|---|---|---|
| White alone (NH) | 958 | 994 | 695 | 74.55% | 67.71% | 56.09% |
| Black or African American alone (NH) | 3 | 8 | 10 | 0.23% | 0.54% | 0.81% |
| Native American or Alaska Native alone (NH) | 14 | 18 | 4 | 1.09% | 1.23% | 0.32% |
| Asian alone (NH) | 4 | 17 | 27 | 0.31% | 1.16% | 2.18% |
| Native Hawaiian or Pacific Islander alone (NH) | 2 | 0 | 0 | 0.16% | 0.00% | 0.00% |
| Other race alone (NH) | 3 | 0 | 14 | 0.23% | 0.00% | 1.13% |
| Mixed race or Multiracial (NH) | 45 | 36 | 53 | 3.50% | 2.45% | 4.28% |
| Hispanic or Latino (any race) | 256 | 395 | 436 | 19.92% | 26.91% | 35.19% |
| Total | 1,285 | 1,468 | 1,239 | 100.00% | 100.00% | 100.00% |

=== 2020 census ===
As of the 2020 census, Lebec had a population of 1,239. The median age was 44.9 years. 19.3% of residents were under the age of 18 and 19.6% were 65 years of age or older. For every 100 females there were 100.5 males, and for every 100 females age 18 and over there were 98.4 males age 18 and over.

0.0% of residents lived in urban areas, while 100.0% lived in rural areas.

There were 466 households, of which 26.0% had children under the age of 18 living in them. Of all households, 48.5% were married-couple households, 23.2% were households with a male householder and no spouse or partner present, and 23.0% were households with a female householder and no spouse or partner present. About 30.9% of all households were made up of individuals, and 11.9% had someone living alone who was 65 years of age or older.

There were 526 housing units, of which 11.4% were vacant. The homeowner vacancy rate was 4.9%, and the rental vacancy rate was 6.9%.

=== 2010 census ===
The 2010 United States census reported that 1,468 people, 533 households, and 372 families resided in the CDP. The population density was 95.8 inhabitants per square mile (37.0/km^{2}). There were 594 housing units at an average density of 38.8 per square mile (15.0/km^{2}). The racial makeup of the CDP was 78.5% White, 1.0% African American, 3.1% Native American, 1.2% Asian, 10.1% from other races, and 6.2% from two or more races. 26.9% of the population was Hispanic or Latino of any race.

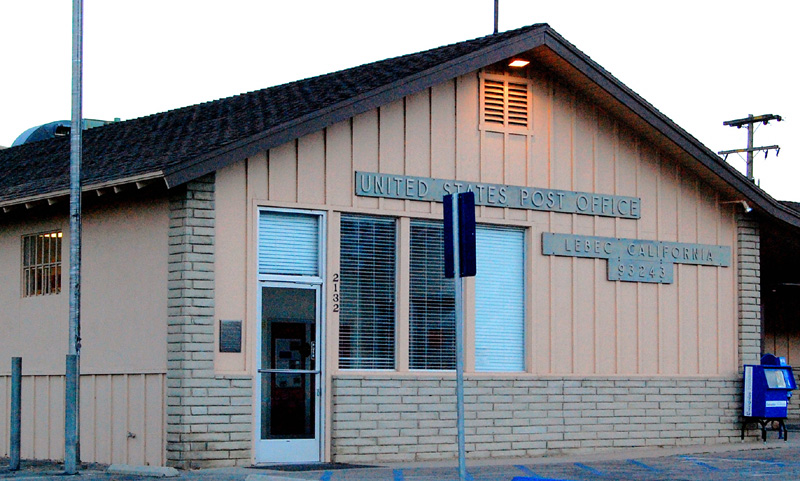
Lebec Post Office

The Census reported that 100% of the population lived in households.

There were 533 households, out of which 33.6% had children under the age of 18 living in them, 54.0% were opposite-sex married couples living together, 9.9% had a female householder with no husband present, and 5.8% had a male householder with no wife present. 5.3% of households were unmarried opposite-sex partnerships and 0.6% were same-sex married couples or partnerships. 25.1% of households were made up of individuals, and 8.3% had someone living alone who was 65 years of age or older. The average household size was 2.75.

The population was spread out, with 26.1% under the age of 18, 8.0% aged 18 to 24, 20.6% aged 25 to 44, 31.8% aged 45 to 64, and 13.5% who were 65 years of age or older. The median age was 40.6 years. For every 100 females there were 108.2 males. For every 100 females age 18 and over, there were 109.1 males.

There were 594 housing units of which 71.1% were owner-occupied and 28.9% were occupied by renters. The homeowner vacancy rate was 2.8%; the rental vacancy rate was 7.1%. 70.4% of the population lived in owner-occupied housing units and 29.6% lived in rental housing units.

=== 2000 census ===
In the 2000 census, the population of the CDP was 1,224 and the racial makeup was 79 percent Caucasian (1,019 people). There were only three African Americans. There were 256 Hispanics or Latinos of any race (20 percent of all residents). Other residents included 16 American Indians or Alaska natives and four Asians.

The median age for Lebec residents was 36 years, almost the same as the 35 years for the nation as a whole.

Lebec also had slightly more veterans than its share, 169, or 19 percent, compared to 13 percent around the country.

Fifty-nine percent of Lebec adults were employed. On average, they traveled 27 minutes to get to their jobs, about the same as most Americans.

Lebec households had a lower median income than the nation as a whole — $46,857, compared to $50,046. Family income was $40,972.

There were just 100 people (or 8 percent) below the poverty level in Lebec in 2000—significantly less than the nation as a whole, which was 12 percent in 2000. When calculated by families, though, the poverty rate in Lebec was only 1.4 percent.

Of the 516 housing units, 319 were occupied by owners and 127 by renters, about the same 7:3 ratio as the rest of the country. Sixty housing units (12 percent) were vacant.

| 2000 figures | Lebec | California | United States |
| Median age | 36.1 | 33.3 | 35.3 |
| White | 79.3% | 59.5% | 75.1% |
| African-American | 0.2% | 6.7% | 12.3% |
| Hispanic/Latino | 19.9% | 32.4% | 12.5% |
| Family income | $40,972 | $53,025 | $50,046 |
| Poverty families | 1.4% | 10.6% | 9.2% |
| Med. home value | $163,600 | $211,500 | $119,600 |
| High school diploma | 72.1% | 76.8% | 80.4% |
| College degree | 11.8% | 28.6% | 24.4% |

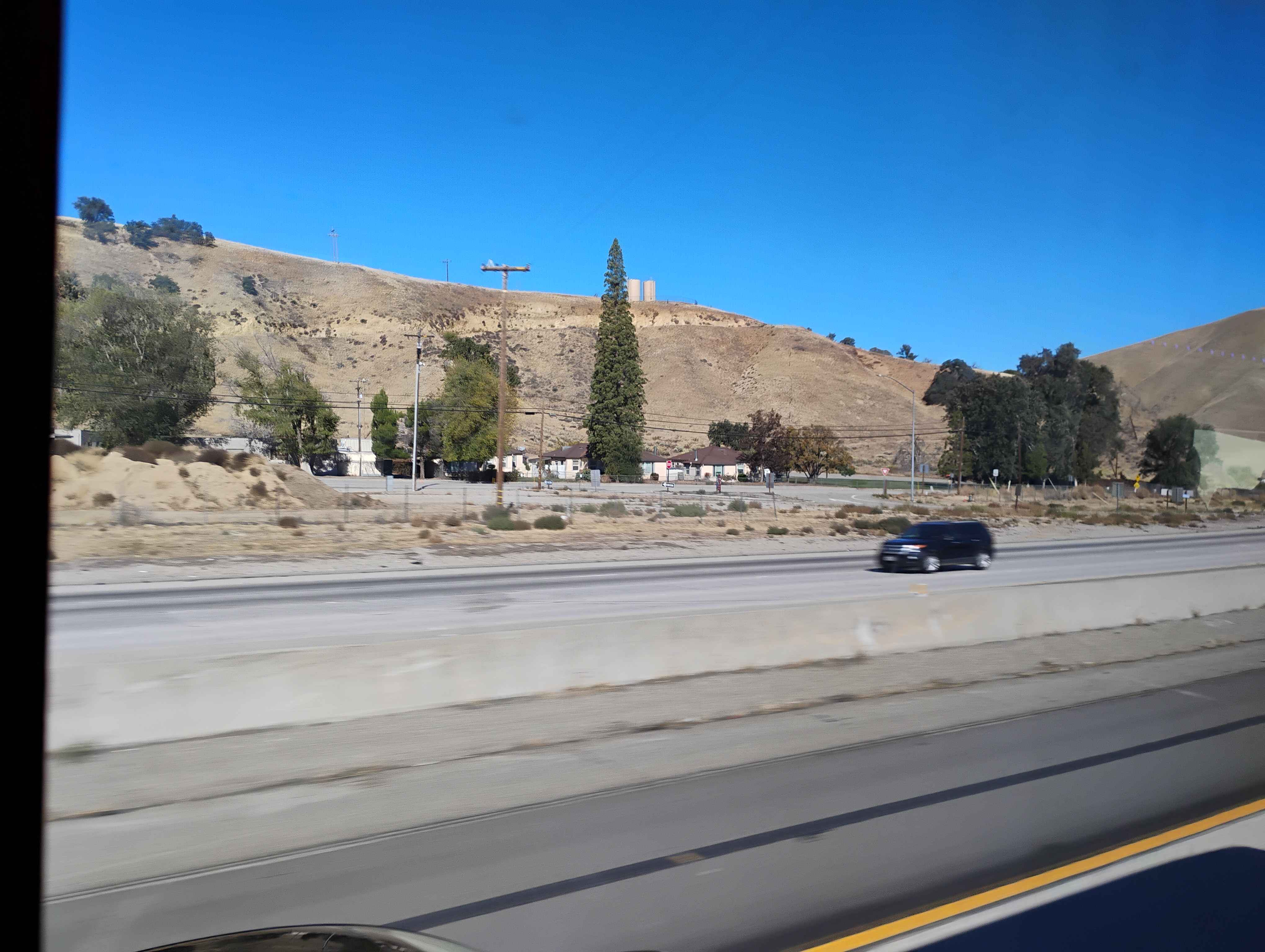
Homes in Lebec, CA.

== Transportation ==
Interstate 5 is the only highway passing through the community. Local traffic drives on Lebec Road, Peace Valley Road, Frazier Mountain Park Road and adjoining streets.

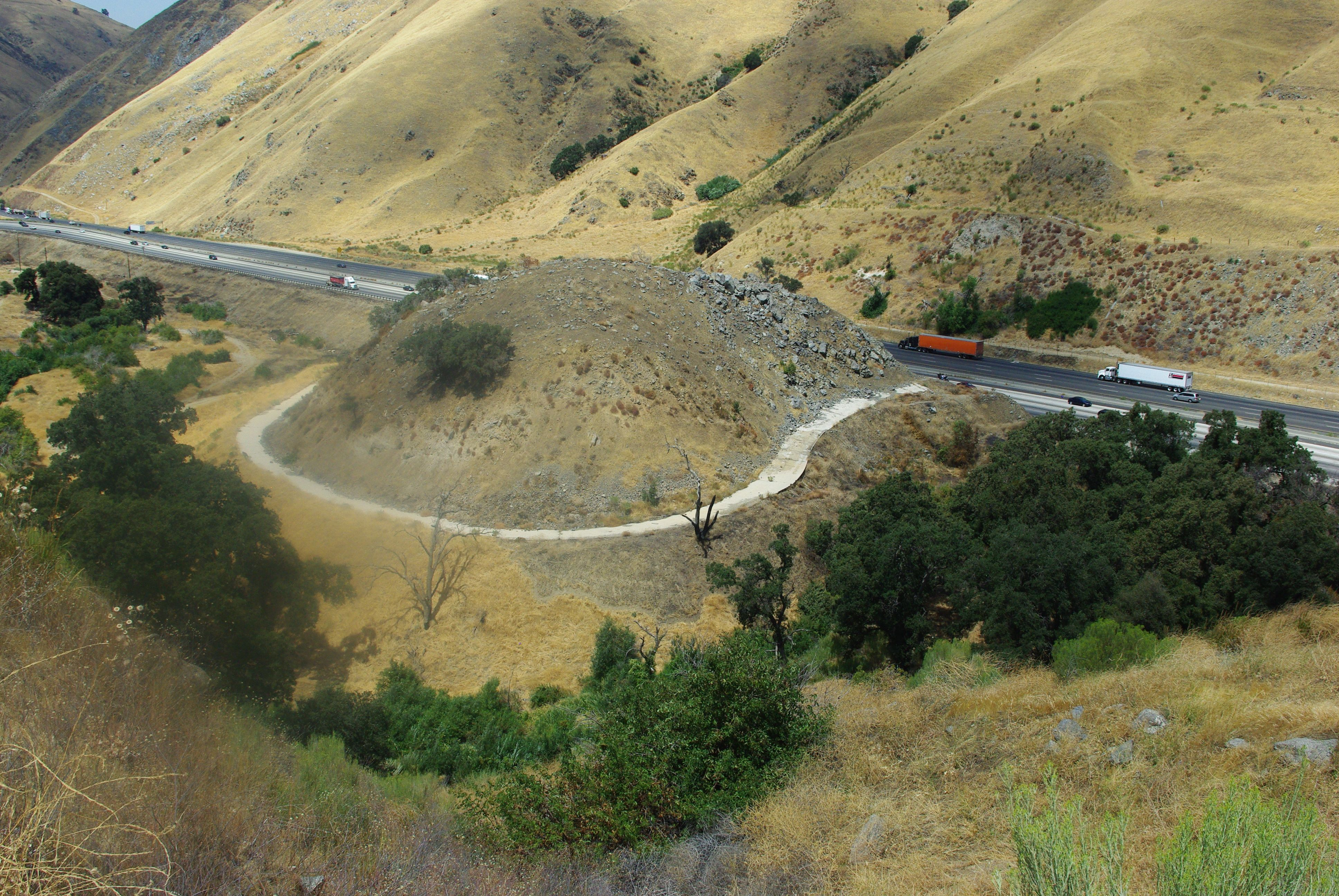
A section of the 1915 Ridge Route in Lebec, California, abandoned when U.S. 99 (later upgraded to I-5) was constructed over the Tejon Pass in order to make the travel straighter and safer

Kern Transit provides bus service Thursdays and Saturdays during the summer months to Frazier Park, Gorman, Lake of the Woods, Pinon Pines, and Pine Mountain Club.

Kern Transit provides weekday service from the Flying J gas station via their Route 130 bus to the Santa Clarita Station Metrolink and the McBean Regional Transit Center, which includes many connecting bus routes, including to North Hollywood Station and Downtown Los Angeles.

== Water district ==
Lebec is served by the Lebec County Water District which was established in 1967 and began operation on April 21, 1969. In October 2011 the district approved a five-year contract with Applied Process Technology to manage the district.

The district serves 836 people, and in May 2012 The New York Times reported that individual sampling of the district's water showed two contaminants above legal limits — alpha particle activity and Combined Uranium (picoCuries per liter). Two contaminants — lead (total) and uranium-228 — were below legal limits but above "health guidelines".

In 2011–2012 a committee of the Kern County grand jury investigated complaints about the installation and connection of a private 12-inch line to the district's water supply, by which a developer hoped to bring water to a hotel then planned for construction. The committee's report claimed that the water line was laid without proper approval and that the "subsequent opening of the hotel created a water shortage that lasted for at least five days." It was later determined that two men affiliated with the district's governance, along with the hotel developers, constructed the water line across Cuddy Creek without a permit from California Department of Fish and Game which was obtained after the fact.

The Grand Jury committee also investigated "a number of complaints" alleging that the board violated the California Open Meetings Law, a.k.a. Brown Act, that it exceeded its authority and that it engaged in "unprofessional conduct". The committee submitted its report in April 2012, finding, among other things, "frequent bickering" among governing board members and the public, "highly irregular" actions at a board meeting in December 2011, including the approval of a "seemingly pre-designated slate" of officers. The committee report stated that the water district "is not operating in a manner that serves the best interests of the public" and recommended "formal training ... and conduct themselves accordingly or resign from the board."

The water district board replied that "the Grand Jury's findings are substantially incorrect" and that the report was "filled with opinion, unsubstantiated with actual facts".

The board voted on January 14, 2014, to open each meeting with a prayer "prior to the Pledge of Allegiance at all future meetings", and president Michael Hightower opened the subsequent meeting, on February 11, "with a call to stand for a minute of silence. He asked that all—including 'atheists or agnostics, with their powers of positive thinking' and those that are faith-based, 'with their prayers,'—to focus on the much-needed resource of rain."

== Businesses ==
Lebec is the home of the Tejon Ranch Company. This ranch has been seen in movies such as The Kid Ranger (1936), Pals of Silver Sage (1940) and Wild Bill (1995).

== Climate ==
This region experiences warm to hot, dry summers and mild to cool winters, with occasional snowfall. No average monthly temperatures are above 71.6 °F (22.0 °C). According to the Köppen climate classification system, Lebec has a warm-summer Mediterranean climate, abbreviated Csa on climate maps.

Climate data for Lebec, California (1991–2020 normals, extremes 2000–2022)
| Month | Jan | Feb | Mar | Apr | May | Jun | Jul | Aug | Sep | Oct | Nov | Dec | Year |
|---|---|---|---|---|---|---|---|---|---|---|---|---|---|
| Record high °F (°C) | 73 (23) | 77 (25) | 85 (29) | 90 (32) | 101 (38) | 103 (39) | 109 (43) | 103 (39) | 102 (39) | 95 (35) | 83 (28) | 78 (26) | 109 (43) |
| Mean maximum °F (°C) | 66.7 (19.3) | 70.1 (21.2) | 74.8 (23.8) | 81.8 (27.7) | 86.0 (30.0) | 95.1 (35.1) | 98.7 (37.1) | 96.9 (36.1) | 95.1 (35.1) | 85.5 (29.7) | 77.7 (25.4) | 67.4 (19.7) | 100.0 (37.8) |
| Mean daily maximum °F (°C) | 54.3 (12.4) | 56.1 (13.4) | 59.3 (15.2) | 64.6 (18.1) | 71.7 (22.1) | 79.8 (26.6) | 87.3 (30.7) | 87.6 (30.9) | 82.0 (27.8) | 72.8 (22.7) | 62.3 (16.8) | 54.0 (12.2) | 69.3 (20.7) |
| Daily mean °F (°C) | 44.4 (6.9) | 45.7 (7.6) | 47.7 (8.7) | 52.1 (11.2) | 59.2 (15.1) | 66.8 (19.3) | 73.5 (23.1) | 73.7 (23.2) | 67.7 (19.8) | 59.5 (15.3) | 50.7 (10.4) | 44.1 (6.7) | 57.1 (13.9) |
| Mean daily minimum °F (°C) | 34.5 (1.4) | 34.8 (1.6) | 36.5 (2.5) | 40.0 (4.4) | 46.8 (8.2) | 55.2 (12.9) | 59.7 (15.4) | 59.8 (15.4) | 53.4 (11.9) | 46.2 (7.9) | 39.1 (3.9) | 34.1 (1.2) | 45.0 (7.2) |
| Mean minimum °F (°C) | 22.9 (−5.1) | 23.3 (−4.8) | 25.5 (−3.6) | 30.1 (−1.1) | 37.0 (2.8) | 41.3 (5.2) | 52.5 (11.4) | 49.6 (9.8) | 43.1 (6.2) | 36.1 (2.3) | 27.4 (−2.6) | 21.2 (−6.0) | 18.5 (−7.5) |
| Record low °F (°C) | 8 (−13) | 12 (−11) | 12 (−11) | 15 (−9) | 26 (−3) | 23 (−5) | 34 (1) | 34 (1) | 34 (1) | 24 (−4) | 15 (−9) | 12 (−11) | 8 (−13) |
| Average precipitation inches (mm) | 2.65 (67) | 2.99 (76) | 2.18 (55) | 1.05 (27) | 0.49 (12) | 0.13 (3.3) | 0.16 (4.1) | 0.06 (1.5) | 0.17 (4.3) | 0.61 (15) | 0.82 (21) | 1.92 (49) | 13.23 (335.2) |
| Average snowfall inches (cm) | 0.8 (2.0) | 1.4 (3.6) | 0.2 (0.51) | 0.0 (0.0) | 0.0 (0.0) | 0.0 (0.0) | 0.0 (0.0) | 0.0 (0.0) | 0.0 (0.0) | 0.0 (0.0) | 0.0 (0.0) | 0.6 (1.5) | 3.0 (7.6) |
| Average precipitation days (≥ 0.01 in) | 6.2 | 6.7 | 5.0 | 3.8 | 2.6 | 0.6 | 0.5 | 0.2 | 0.6 | 2.0 | 3.5 | 5.9 | 37.6 |
| Average snowy days (≥ 0.1 in) | 0.4 | 0.3 | 0.2 | 0.0 | 0.0 | 0.0 | 0.0 | 0.0 | 0.0 | 0.0 | 0.0 | 0.2 | 1.1 |
Source 1: NOAA
Source 2: National Weather Service (mean maxima/minima 2006–2020, average high/mean/low 2000–2022)

== See also ==
- The Mountain Enterprise—newspaper circulating in Lebec and the surrounding communities
