= 1857 Fort Tejon earthquake =

Earthquake in California, United States

- UTC time: 1857-01-09 16:24
- USGS-ANSS: ComCat
- Local date: January 9, 1857
- Local time: 08:20
- Duration: 1–3 minutes
- Magnitude: 7.9 M_{w}
- Depth: < 10 km (6.2 mi)
- Epicenter: 35.7°N 120.3°W
- Fault: San Andreas Fault
- Type: Strike-slip
- Areas affected: Central California; Southern California; United States
- Total damage: Severe
- Max. intensity: MMI IX (Violent)
- Casualties: 2 killed

The 1857 Fort Tejon earthquake occurred at about 8:20 a.m. (Pacific time) on January 9 in central and Southern California. One of the largest recorded earthquakes in the United States, with an estimated moment magnitude of 7.9, it ruptured the southern part of the San Andreas Fault for a length of about 225 miles (350 km), between Parkfield and Wrightwood.

Although the epicenter or starting location of the earthquake was near Parkfield, the event is referred to as the Fort Tejon earthquake, because that was the location of the greatest damage. Fort Tejon is just north of the junction of the San Andreas and Garlock Faults, where the Tehachapi, San Emigdio, and Sierra Pelona Transverse Ranges come together.

The earthquake is the most recent large event to occur along that portion of the San Andreas Fault, and is estimated to have had a maximum perceived intensity of IX (Violent) on the Modified Mercalli scale (MMI) near Fort Tejon in the Tehachapi Mountains, and along the San Andreas Fault from Mil Potrero (near Pine Mountain Club) in the San Emigdio Mountains to Lake Hughes in the Sierra Pelona Mountains. Accounts of the events' effects varied widely, including the time of the main shock as well as foreshocks that occurred at several locations earlier in the morning.

== Tectonic setting ==
The 1857 earthquake ruptured about 350 kilometres (220 mi) of the southern part of the San Andreas Fault, the structure that accommodates most of the displacement along the transform boundary between the North American plate and the Pacific plate. The Pacific plate is moving north relative to the Sierra Nevada-Great Valley Block of the North American plate at about 38 millimetres (1.5 in) per year. The displacement rate along the various sections that ruptured is 34 millimetres (1.3 in) per year along the Parkfield, Cholame, Carrizo and Big Bend sections and 27 millimetres (1.1 in) and 29 millimetres (1.1 in) per year along the Mojave north and Mojave south sections. Paleoseismic studies have found evidence for many prehistoric earthquakes in the last 3,000 years on this part of the San Andreas Fault.

== Earthquake ==
The earthquake ruptured a substantial portion of the southern San Andreas fault, but not the entire length. Thomas H. Jordan, director of the Southern California Earthquake Center, stated that the slip likely stopped in the area near Cajon Pass, perhaps because the tectonic stresses on that part of the fault had been released several decades earlier during the 1812 Wrightwood earthquake. The average slip along the fault was 4.5 metres (15 ft), and a maximum offset of 6 metres (20 ft) was recorded in the Carrizo Plain area in southeastern San Luis Obispo County. With an estimated magnitude of 7.9, this was the last "Big One" in Southern California. The extreme southernmost portion of the San Andreas fault, which terminates near Bombay Beach at the Salton Sea, last ruptured in 1680.

Surface faulting may have extended beyond the boundaries of the regularly acknowledged slip length. Researchers recorded first and second-hand accounts of the ground crack, which was understood to be recent surface faulting and not just the topography of the existing rift. On the extreme northern end of the rupture zone, the surface cracking extended 80 kilometres (50 mi) north of Cholame into San Benito County. On the southern end, the population centers were not as close to the fault, and early observers were probably limited to the stretch of the fault between Fort Tejon and Elizabeth Lake, as that was close to the Stockton – Los Angeles Road, the primary inland north−south route then.

Evidence of uprooted and displaced trees south of Elizabeth Lake indicates surface faulting along a mole track (an "array of en echelon primary Riedel shears with linking compressional rolls and minor thrusts") that ran directly under three Jeffrey pines. Two of the three trees examined were tilted in their lower extremity, while the upper portions remained relatively untilted. Tree ring dating confirmed that the trees had originated 10 and 25 years before 1857 and also that the rings began to grow twice as thick on the side in the direction of the tilt. This is a frequently noted compensation of tree tilt. Seismologist Kerry Sieh determined that fault slip and the associated ground disturbance were the source of the mole track and subsequent tree tilt.

=== Foreshocks ===
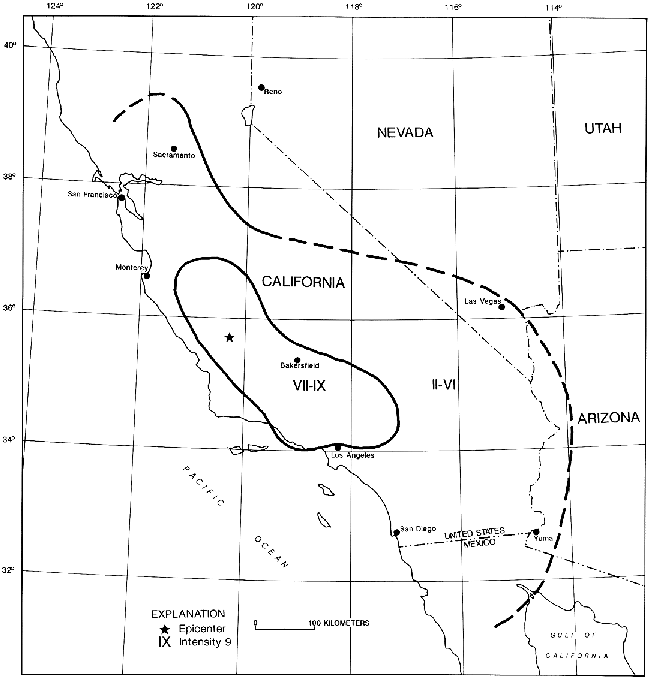
An isoseismal map for the main shock

Various accounts of the event indicate the presence of foreshocks between one and nine hours before the main event, and based on the (uncertain) distribution of those shocks, it is assumed that the beginning of the fault rupture (the epicenter) was in the area between Parkfield and Cholame, about 97 kilometres (60 mi) northwest.

The lack of standardized timekeeping during this period of California's history contributed to some of the inaccurate reports of when the pre-shocks occurred. Local solar time was being used in 1857 and San Francisco would have been the locality with the most accurate time kept, as it was a center of commerce and other activity. Standard time was not followed until the 1880s, with the Pacific Time Zone being aligned with the 120th meridian. The differences in local times were substantial, with San Francisco at 122.43 W and San Diego at 117.10 W, the difference between the two would be around 22 minutes (4 minutes per degree). At least one individual reported foreshock times that varied by as much as half an hour when speaking to two different newspapers.

The firsthand reports were most abundant for the shocks felt at 1, 2, and 4 hours before the main shock which were later labeled the predawn, dawn, and sunrise shocks. The predawn event shook residents of San Francisco (MMI II – III), San Jose (MMI IV), and Santa Cruz (MMI IV). The dawn shock was felt in those locales plus Fort Tejon and possibly the Carrizo Plain. The sunrise shock was felt in San Francisco (MMI III), Monterey (MMI IV), and Visalia (MMI II – III). Sacramento and Los Angeles did not report any of these events.

Several mid-twentieth-century earthquakes had similar felt reports to the dawn and sunrise shocks, and with close inspection, Sieh theorizes that both events were local to coastal central California, probably between Point Conception and Monterey. Also, during that period, no central California earthquake with a magnitude of less than five had a felt area as large as the two foreshocks, while events larger than magnitude six have had "somewhat larger" felt areas, so it could be said that the foreshocks most likely were between magnitude five and six.

Parkfield earthquakes occurred with exceptionally regular intervals (between 20 and 30 years) between 1857 and 1966. Sieh studied four of these events (1901, 1922, 1934, and 1966) and found that they helped to determine the southeast boundary for the origination of the dawn foreshock. The coverage and intensities of felt reports for that earthquake show a solid resemblance to the Parkfield events. Only one of the four Parkfield events was not felt further southeast than the dawn shock, so Sieh concluded that if the San Andreas was the source of the event, then it was reasonable to assume that the Parkfield to Cholame stretch of the fault was responsible for producing the dawn felt intensities, though the San Andreas is not the only possible source for the dawn event. For example, the November 22, 1952, magnitude six Bryson earthquake "nearly duplicates" the felt reports. That event may have occurred west of the San Andreas on the Nacimiento fault, though the highest felt reports were along the Rinconada fault around 56 kilometres (35 mi) southwest of the San Andreas.

=== Damage ===
Most of the adobe buildings at Fort Tejon were badly damaged and several people were injured there. More buildings were destroyed along a twenty-mile stretch between Fort Tejon and southeast to Elizabeth Lake, a sag pond that was formed directly on the San Andreas fault. Streams and springs experienced disturbances in San Diego and Santa Barbara Counties, while the Kern River, Kern Lake, and Los Angeles River all spilled over their banks. Farther north in Santa Clara County the flow of well water was affected. Ground cracks from liquefaction of swampy ground were observed near the Pueblo de Los Angeles and in the Oxnard Plain, and ground fissures were reported near the Los Angeles, Santa Ana, and Santa Clara Rivers.

Central and southern California were thinly populated at the time and this likely helped limit the damage from the earthquake, but the lack of people present also reduced the number of perspectives to use in determining intensity estimates. Areas with the highest population density like San Francisco, Stockton, and Los Angeles provided enough information about the effects of the earthquake to provide the best estimates of intensity. At downtown Los Angeles, with a maximum perceived intensity of VI, some homes and buildings were cracked, but no major damage was reported. In Ventura (MM VII) the roof of Mission San Buenaventura collapsed and the bell tower was damaged, and farther north, the front wall of the old adobe Mission Santa Cruz chapel collapsed. One of the two deaths reported included a woman who was killed by a collapsing adobe house in nearby Gorman, and an elderly man may have collapsed and died in the Los Angeles area as a result of the earthquake.

=== Aftershocks ===
The main shock was followed by a series of aftershocks that continued for at least 3.75 years, although the total number of large aftershocks was less than would be expected for an earthquake of this size. The four largest aftershocks all had magnitudes greater than 6, although there are large uncertainties in both location and magnitude due to the limited number of data points available. On the night of January 9 there was a large aftershock with an estimated magnitude of about 6.25, with a possible epicenter near the Garlock Fault. The largest aftershock occurred on the afternoon of January 16 with an estimated magnitude of about 6.7, a possible offshore location, and high felt intensities in Southern California communities. Santa Barbara and San Bernardino reported an MM intensity of V and Los Angeles reported V and VI. Two significant events occurred in the San Bernardino area on December 15–16, 1858, with the latter having an estimated magnitude of about 6. The last recorded major aftershock occurred on April 16, 1860, with an estimated magnitude of about 6.3, with an epicenter close to the Parkfield section of the San Andreas Fault.

== Future threat ==
Scientists and public service officials have speculated on the threat of another very large earthquake occurring in southern California and what type and scale of damage might result. The portion of the fault that ruptured in 1857 has settled into a period of dormancy and this has given rise to suggestions that future slip along that zone may be characterized by a very large 1857-type event followed by another period of inactivity. The communities of Frazier Park, Palmdale, and Wrightwood are all located very close to the San Andreas fault, though much of the Los Angeles area could be affected even at a greater distance from the rupture area if a similar event were to reoccur there. Swaminathan Krishnan, assistant professor of civil engineering and geophysics at the California Institute of Technology, said that if a similar rupture from Parkfield to Wrightwood were to happen again, it would severely affect the Los Angeles area, with the San Fernando Valley being particularly hard hit.

The Los Angeles Aqueduct and California Aqueduct, two of the principal water transfer infrastructure systems supplying Greater Los Angeles, both cross the San Andreas fault within the main damage zone of the Fort Tejon earthquake, in the Tehachapi and Sierra Pelona Mountains.

== See also ==
- List of earthquakes in California
- List of earthquakes in the United States
- List of historical earthquakes
