= Mountain Communities of the Tejon Pass =

Communities in Kern, Los Angeles and Ventura counties, California

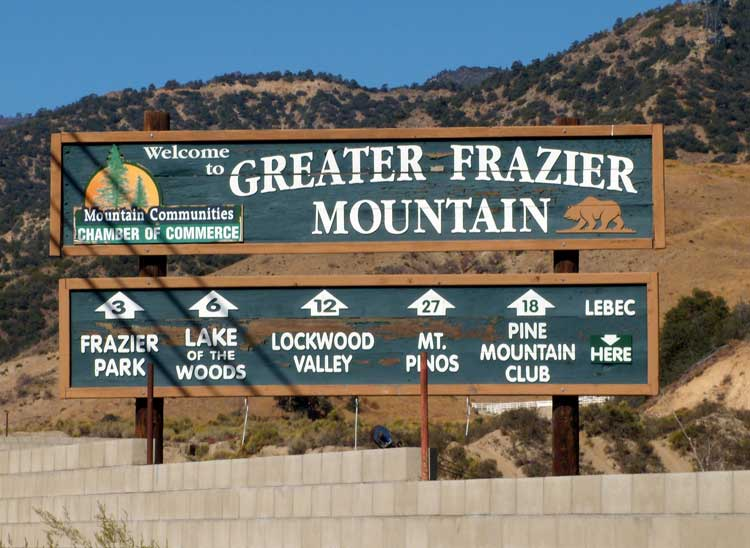
- Sign listing six of the Mountain Communities (2008)
- Interactive map of Mountain Communities of the Tejon Pass
- Coordinates: 34°49′22″N 118°56′41″W
- Country: United States
- State: California
- Counties: Kern, Los Angeles, and Ventura
- Principal communities: List: Frazier Park; Pine Mountain Club; Lebec; Lake of the Woods; Lockwood Valley; Pinon Pines; Gorman

Population (2010)
  - Total: 7,391

The Mountain Communities of the Tejon Pass, or the Frazier Mountain Communities, in the San Emigdio Mountains is a region of California that includes Lebec, Frazier Park, Lake of the Woods, Pinon Pines, and Pine Mountain Club, in Kern County, Gorman in Los Angeles County and Lockwood Valley within Kern and Ventura counties. They are all within or near the Tejon Pass, which links Southern California with the San Joaquin Valley. Also sometimes included within the communities are Cuddy Valley, Grapevine, Neenach and New Cuyama.

Although the communities are divided among three counties (four, if New Cuyama, which is in Santa Barbara County, is included), they are tied together by the local newspaper, the Mountain Enterprise, the Mountain Communities Chamber of Commerce, and the Ridge Route Communities Museum and Historical Society. All the communities are unincorporated areas, and all are served by their respective county agencies, such as sheriff's departments and county fire departments.

== Demographics ==
The source for this section is the U.S. Census Bureau, American FactFinder.

=== Population ===
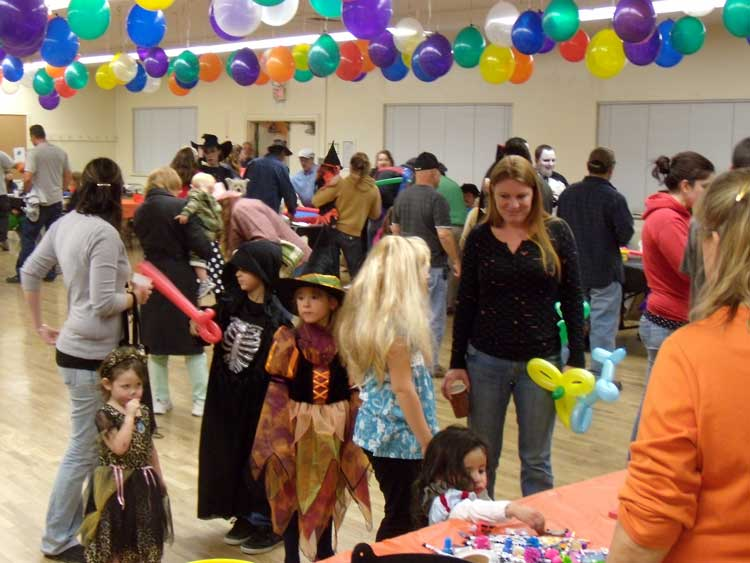
Some of the people who live in the Mountain Communities at a Halloween celebration in Frazier Park (2008)

A total of 6,066 people lived within the four areas of the Mountain Communities that were distinguished in the March 2000 U.S. census — 2,348 in Frazier Park, 1,600 in Pine Mountain Club, 1,285 in Lebec, and 833 in Lake of the Woods. There were 3,931 housing units — houses, apartments, trailers, etc. — of which only 2,392 were occupied.

The area's residents were older than the U.S. median — which was 35.3 years of age at the time. Pine Mountain Club was the "oldest" community — the median age being 45 and 15 percent of the residents being older than 65. Lake of the Woods's median age was 39, with 14 percent of its population over 65, Frazier Park's median age was 38, with 10 percent of its residents over 65, and Lebec had a median age of 36, with 13 percent over 65.

By another measurement, Lebec was the "youngest" town. Eight percent of its residents were under age 5, compared to six percent in Frazier Park and five percent in Pine Mountain Club and Lake of the Woods.

The Mountain Communities were overwhelmingly white — 91 percent in Pine Mountain Club, 88 percent in Frazier Park, 87 percent in Lake of the Woods, and 79 percent in Lebec. Latinos or Hispanics of any race amounted to 20 percent in Lebec, 12 percent in Frazier Park, 11 percent in Lake of the Woods, and nine percent in Pine Mountain Club.

Reported yearly incomes for each person in the labor force were $25,465 (in 1999 dollars) in Pine Mountain Club, $19,302 in Frazier Park, $17,983 in Lake of the Woods, and $14,895 in Lebec.

Pine Mountain Club also had the highest household and family incomes (at a median of $45,250 and $62,750, respectively), Frazier Park was next with $40,721 and $46,857, Lake of the Woods showed $42,742 and $43,468, and Lebec trailed with $39,063 and $40,972. To measure the income of a household, the pre-tax money receipts of all residents over the age of 15 over a single year were combined. Family income measured households with two or more people related through blood, marriage, or adoption.

Educational levels correlated to a large degree with income: Thirty-one percent of Pine Mountain Club residents had bachelor's degrees or higher, compared to 22 percent in Lake of the Woods, 15 percent in Frazier Park and 12 percent in Lebec.

But Pine Mountain Club had the highest percentage of people whose incomes were below the poverty level — 17 percent (193 people), with Lake of the Woods following at 14 percent (119 people), Frazier Park at 12 percent (291 people) and Lebec last at eight percent (100 people).

=== Housing ===
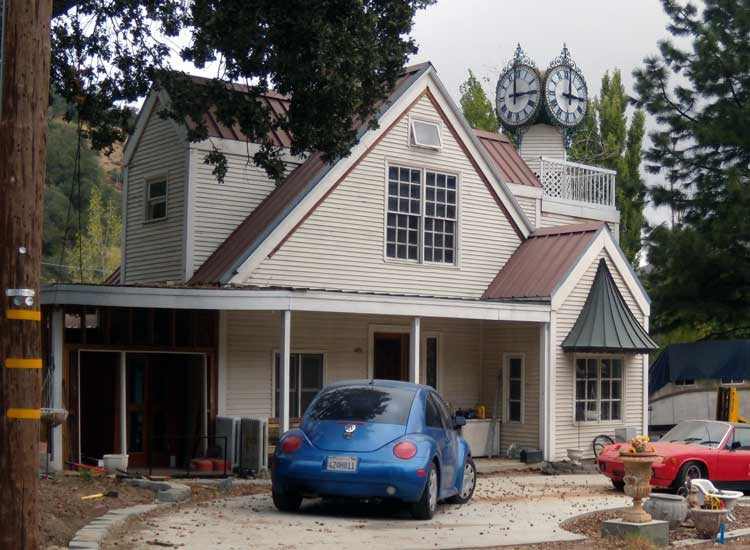
One of the distinctive houses in a Lebec neighborhood (2008)

The utilization by Mountain Community property owners of residences as second homes, vacation homes or seasonal rental properties can be shown by the fact that 62 percent of the 1,737 Pine Mountain Club houses (1,069) were vacant in March 2000 when the census was taken. In Lake of the Woods, the vacancies were 27 percent (or 129 of 475 housing units); Frazier Park, with 23 percent (or 281 of 1,203 units) and in Lebec, there were only 60 vacancies of 516 units, or 12 percent. All those figures in these mountainous communities were higher than that for the country as a whole — nine percent.

The vacancies correlated with the elevation of the communities — 5,554 feet for Pine Mountain Club, 5,121 feet for Lake of the Woods, 4,767 feet for Frazier Park, and 3,481 feet for Lebec. Elevation generally corresponds to snow levels in the winter.

Lebec had the highest valuation of single-family owner-occupied homes. The median, as identified by the census respondents, was $163,600 for 104 houses in Lebec, $144,500 for 453 houses in Pine Mountain Club, $96,800 for 636 such houses in Frazier Park, and $89,700 for 187 in Lake of the Woods. The median is the point at which half the homes were valued for more and half for less. These figures are not the same as actual real-estate sales. Neither do they reflect the value of second or vacation homes, or houses rented out.

Of the occupied residences, Pine Mountain Club, which is a private community, had the highest ratio of owner-occupied units — 84 percent, followed by Frazier Park and Lebec, each with 70 percent, and Lake of the Woods, 69 percent. The rest were occupied by renters.

2000 figures	Pine Mountain Club	Lake of the Woods	Frazier Park	Lebec
Elevation	5,554 feet	5,121 feet	4,767 feet	3,481 feet
Population	1,600	833	2,348	1,285
Median age	45	40	38	36
White	91%	87%	88%	79%
Black	0.6%	0.0%	0.6%	0.2%
Hispanic/Latino	9%	11%	12%	20%
Native American	1%	2%	1%	1%
Asian	0.8%	1.9%	0.8%	0.3%
Family income	$62,750	$43,468	$46,857	$40,972
Med. home value	$144,500	$69,700	$96,800	$163,600
Vacancy rate	62%	27%	23%	12%

Notes: "Native Americans" includes Alaska natives. "Family income" is median family income in 1999 dollars. "Med. home value" is the median value of single-family houses. The "vacancy rate" is based on vacant housing units of any type in March 2000. Some figures have been rounded.

== Government ==
=== Town Council ===
As unincorporated areas, the Mountain Communities have no local government, but they were served by the volunteer Mountain Communities Town Council, formed in 1995 "to provide a stronger local voice in community development" and to be "a liaison between various government agencies and the community at large." The first officers were Bob Anderson, president; Fred Rose, vice president; Richard Haugh, treasurer, and Ana Soares, secretary. The highest number of votes cast was 184 for Sanchez.

Electioneering was frustrating for council members because Kern County officials denied their request to allow a vote at the same time residents balloted in county elections. The council also tried putting a mail-in ballot in the local newspaper.

As a result, a proposal was made in 2006 to the local county supervisor, Raymond A. Watson, to strengthen the council, but, according to the local newspaper, The Mountain Enterprise, it "received a chilly response." Rose said that Watson rejected a proposal to establish an elected municipal advisory council as allowed by state law.

During the 2004-2009 period, the council held a number of forums, which attracted more than a thousand people considering subjects ranging from wildfire evacuations to land-development proposals. In 2007, the California Air Resources Board lent it equipment to test air quality in Lebec.

The Town Council voted to dissolve itself, with its last meeting held on October 16, 2008. At that time, the council decided to bring the matter of a municipal advisory council — or MAC — before Watson again.

=== Municipal Advisory Council ===
Rose thereupon sent a letter to Watson on behalf of a "Mountain Communities MAC/CSD Working Group" for establishment of an elected municipal advisory council, or MAC, with a budget of $10,000, along with a part-time clerk and space at the supervisor's office in Frazier Park. It would cover only the Kern County part of the Mountain Communities.

Watson responded to a query from The Mountain Enterprise that

I am opposed to any new layer of government that adds significant costs and bureaucracy. … The idea of a municipal advisory committee or perhaps some other local representative would be strictly advisory. Ultimately, decisions for the Mountain Communities will lie with the elected Supervisor, whoever that is."

On February 23, 2009, an open meeting of about 75 people was held in Frazier Park under the control of Supervisor Watson. A poll by show of hands revealed about 40 in favor of a MAC, 7 opposed, and 20 undecided, with others not voting.

On August 14, 2009, Watson announced he would recommend the formation of a Municipal Advisory Council to the Kern County Board of Supervisors, with the first members to be Stacy Havener of Pine Mountain, Linda MacKay of Lebec, Steve Newman of Cuddy Valley, Robert Peterson of Lebec, and Anne Weber of Frazier Park.

In 2013 the organization, dubbed MCMAC, contained 4,370 registered voters among the area's 8,384 Kern County residents.

Few local residents, however, attended the council's meetings. MacKay resigned from the body after five months, saying that it had been "hijacked" by Watson to be a rubber stamp and that she was appointed for "token diversity." Watson appointed nobody to fill MacKay's seat.

The people of the mountain communities began to boycott the meetings. The MCMAC often met to empty rooms: four people talked to each other and empty chairs for nearly three years.

In April 2012, however, both candidates to succeed Watson—David Couch and Harley Pinson—each said he favored an elected Mountain Communities Advisory Council, and after Couch won the election, the remaining four council members resigned.

The town council never returned to the area.

=== 2020 ===
In June 2020 a new town council was organizing with the intention of uniting the community and saving many local businesses and community development programs. A community roads district is one of the goals. Making Main Street Frazier Park an arts and entertainment district is another.

== Education ==
=== El Tejon Unified School District ===
The El Tejon Unified School District serves the entire mountain community: Lockwood Valley is part of the district even though it is within Ventura County, and Gorman students are accepted into the high school by special permit.

Frazier Park Elementary School educates children in kindergarten through third grade. El Tejon Middle School in Lebec takes district students from the fourth through the eighth grade. Frazier Mountain High School, also in Lebec, was founded in 1995 for ninth- through 12th-graders.

=== Gorman Joint School District ===
Gorman children and others from outside the district are educated in the small Gorman Elementary School from kindergarten through eighth grade.

=== Other education ===
Home-schooling is important in the Mountain Communities, according to a March 2008 report in the Mountain Enterprise, which added:

Per capita, the Mountain Communities may have one of the highest rates of homeschooling in the state, far above the national average of 2 to 4 percent, Holly Van Houten [a home-school parent of the area] . . . said. Estimates range between 8 and 30 percent—somewhere between 100 and 400 children, she reports.

Frazier Park hosted a branch of the Charter Oaks Community Charter School, headquartered in Bakersfield. The charter school was designed to "provide opportunities, support, and accountability for parents in their homeschooling endeavors."

== See also ==
Geographical features

- Frazier Mountain
- Mount Pinos
- San Andreas Fault
- Garlock Fault
- San Emigdio Mountains
- San Joaquin Valley
- Tehachapi Mountains
- Transverse Ranges

Historic events

- 1857 Fort Tejon earthquake
- Ridge Route

Nature

- California condor
- California Floristic Province
- California poppy
- List of California native plants

Newspaper

- The Mountain Enterprise

Recreation

- Fort Tejon
- Los Padres National Forest

Transportation

- Interstate 5 in California
