= Lockwood Valley, California =

Unincorporated community in California, United States

- Unincorporated community
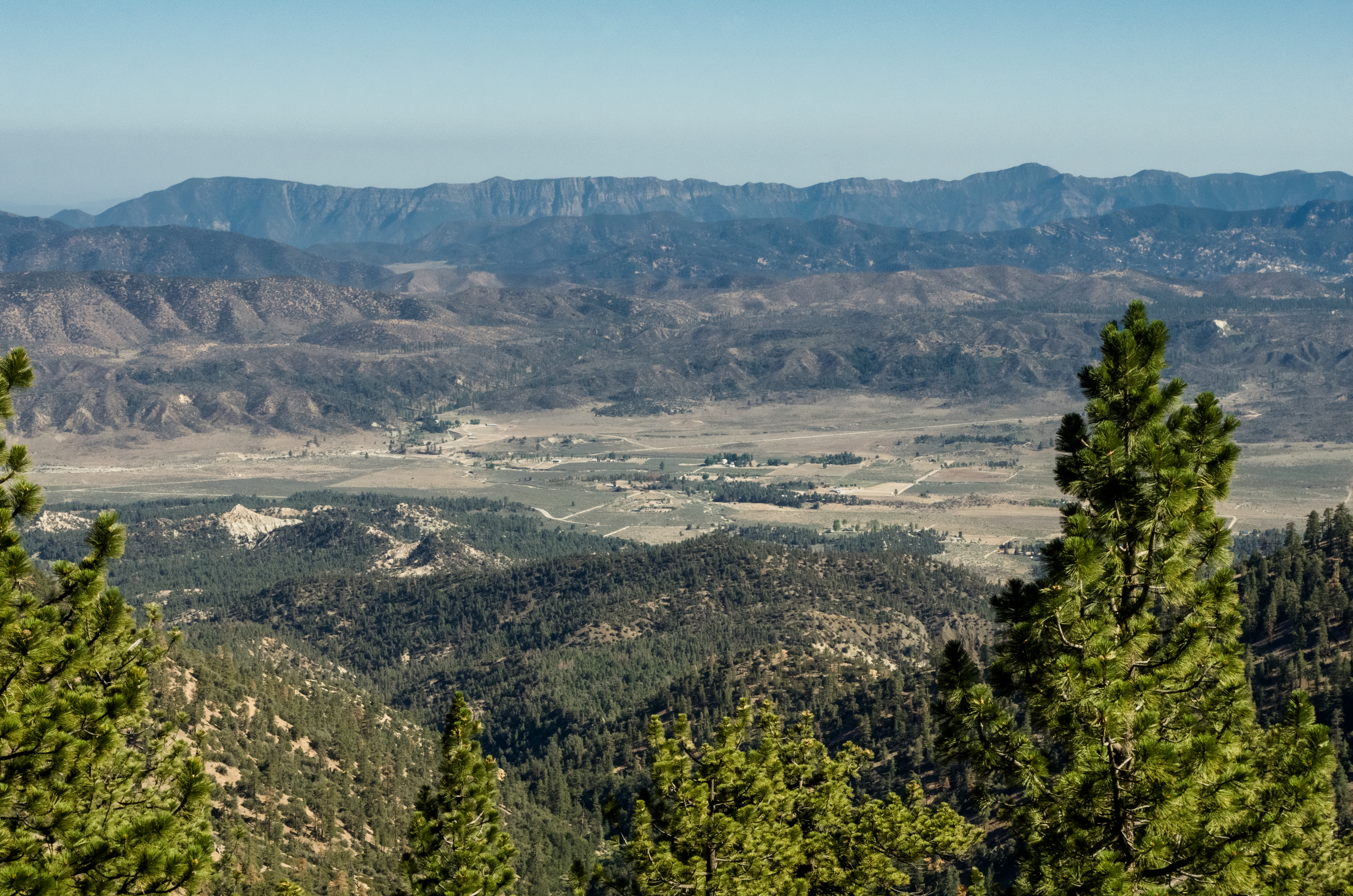
- Lockwood Valley as viewed from Mount Pinos

- Location in California
- Coordinates: 34°43′57″N 119°02′31″W
- Country: United States
- State: California
- County: Ventura
- Elevation: 4,839 ft (1,475 m)

Lockwood Valley is an unincorporated community located in an eponymous valley in northeastern Ventura County, southern California, United States, and is part of the Mountain Communities of the Tejon Pass.

== History ==
Mining for gold and silver dates back to 1853. While significant quantities were never found, there were 200 to 2, 000 miners who worked the mines. Later twenty-mule teams hauled borax to a processing facility in Lancaster. The mines were closed in the 1930s.

== Geography ==
The valley is located within the San Emigdio Mountains at an elevation of 4,839 feet (1475m). Lockwood Creek, a tributary of Piru Creek, runs west to east through the southern portion of the valley. The valley is surrounded by the Los Padres National Forest. Frazier Park in Kern County is the nearest town and is used by the Postal Service for addressing purposes for the remote area.

== Government and infrastructure ==
The County of Ventura has a fenced complex that includes a seasonal Ventura County Fire Department station and the Lockwood Valley Sheriff station.
