= Frazier Park, California =

- Unincorporated community
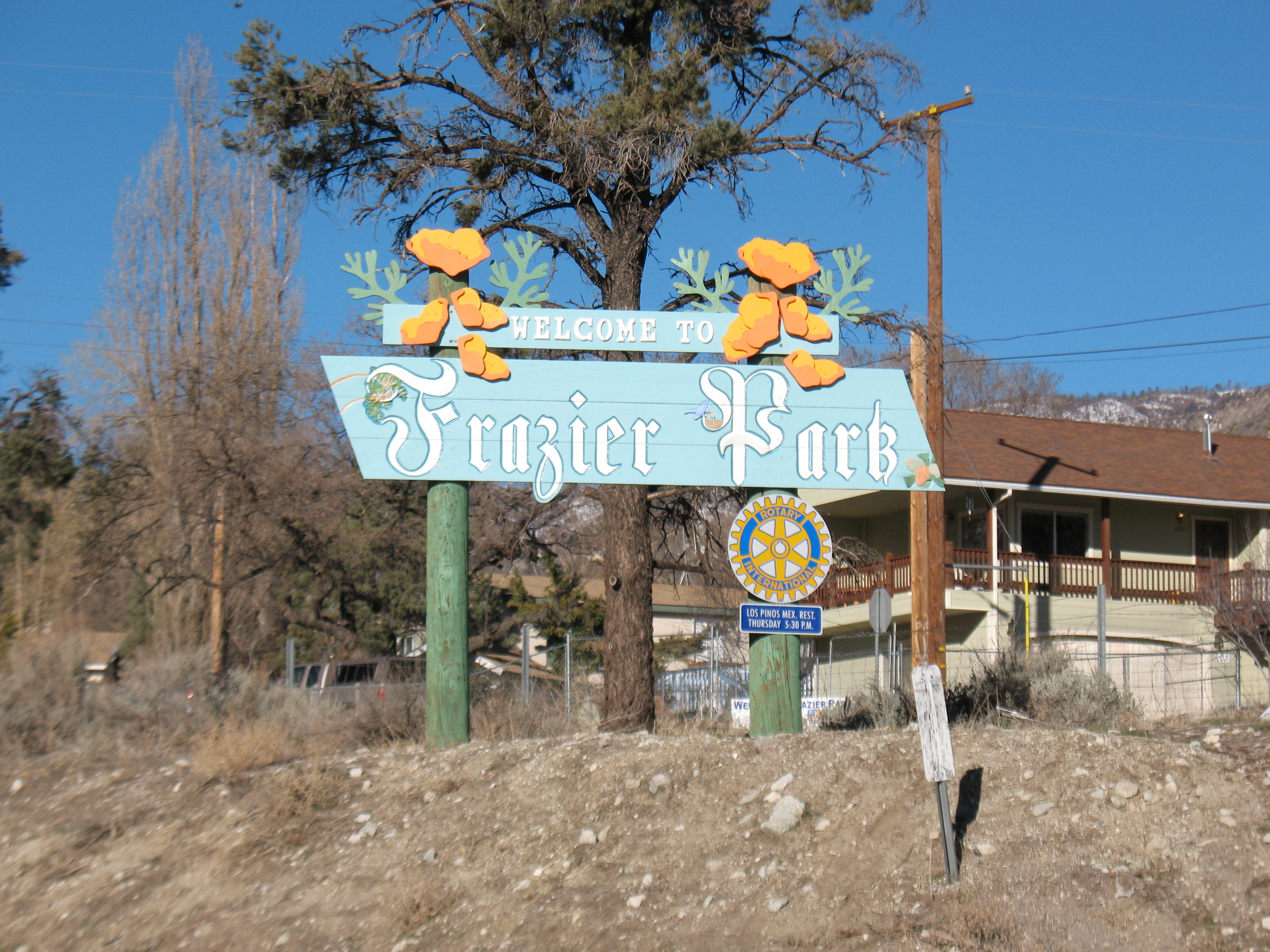
- Entrance to Frazier Park, 2008

- Location in Kern County and the state of California

- Location in Southern California Location in California Location in the United States
- Coordinates: 34°49′22″N 118°56′41″W
- Country: United States
- State: California
- County: Kern

Government
  - County supervisor: Chris Parlier
  - Senate: Shannon Grove (R)
  - Assembly: Stan Ellis (R)
  - U. S. Congress: Vince Fong (R)

Area
  - Total: 5.218 sq mi (13.514 km^{2})
  - Land: 5.216 sq mi (13.510 km^{2})
  - Water: 0.0015 sq mi (0.004 km^{2}) 0.03%
- Elevation: 4,639 ft (1,414 m)

Population (2020)
  - Total: 2,592
  - Density: 496.9/sq mi (191.9/km^{2})
- Time zone: UTC-8 (PST)
  - Summer (DST): UTC-7 (PDT)
- ZIP codes: 93222, 93225
- Area code: 661
- FIPS code: 06-25534
- GNIS feature ID: 1656523

Frazier Park is a village and unincorporated community in Kern County, California, United States. It is 5 miles (8 km) west of Lebec, at an elevation of 4,639 feet (1,414 m). It is one of the Mountain Communities of the Tejon Pass. The population was 2,592 in the 2020 census, down from 2,691 in 2010.

== History ==
The earliest record relating to Frazier Park was a report in 1854 that lumber was being produced there from Frazier Mountain trees for use at the new Army post at nearby Fort Tejon. Local historian Bonnie Ketterl Kane wrote that the mill was "supposedly" at the southeast end of the present community. She cited another report that a Kitanemuk Indian referred to the site as Campo del Soldado (Soldier's Camp), "which was where the soldiers stayed when they cut timber from a mountain they called Pinery Mountain, today's Frazier Mountain."

The community was established in 1925 by Harry McBain, who named it in 1926 for Frazier Mountain, on its southern flank. Its post office was established on September 14, 1927, with Charles B. Fife as the first postmaster.

Frazier Park was used in filming for The Waltons television show and the 1973 science fiction thriller The Clones.

Frazier Park is the setting of the 2011 film The FP and 1974's The Black Six.

On October 11, 2023, a winning Powerball lottery ticket worth $1.75 billion was sold in Frazier Park. The owners of the Midway Market & Liquor store where the ticket was purchased received a $1 million bonus for selling the billion-dollar ticket.

== Geography ==
Frazier Park lies within Cuddy Canyon in the San Emigdio Mountains, within the Los Padres National Forest. Mount Pinos is the highest peak in the area at 8,831 ft (2,692 m).

Other nearby communities include Lake of the Woods (3.6 miles (5.8 km)), Lebec (4.6 miles (7.4 km)), Pine Mountain Club (14.5 miles (23.3 km)), and Mettler (16.7 miles (26.9 km)). Santa Clarita is the nearest large city to the south on Interstate 5 (I-5), and Bakersfield is the largest city to the north of Interstate 5 (I-5).

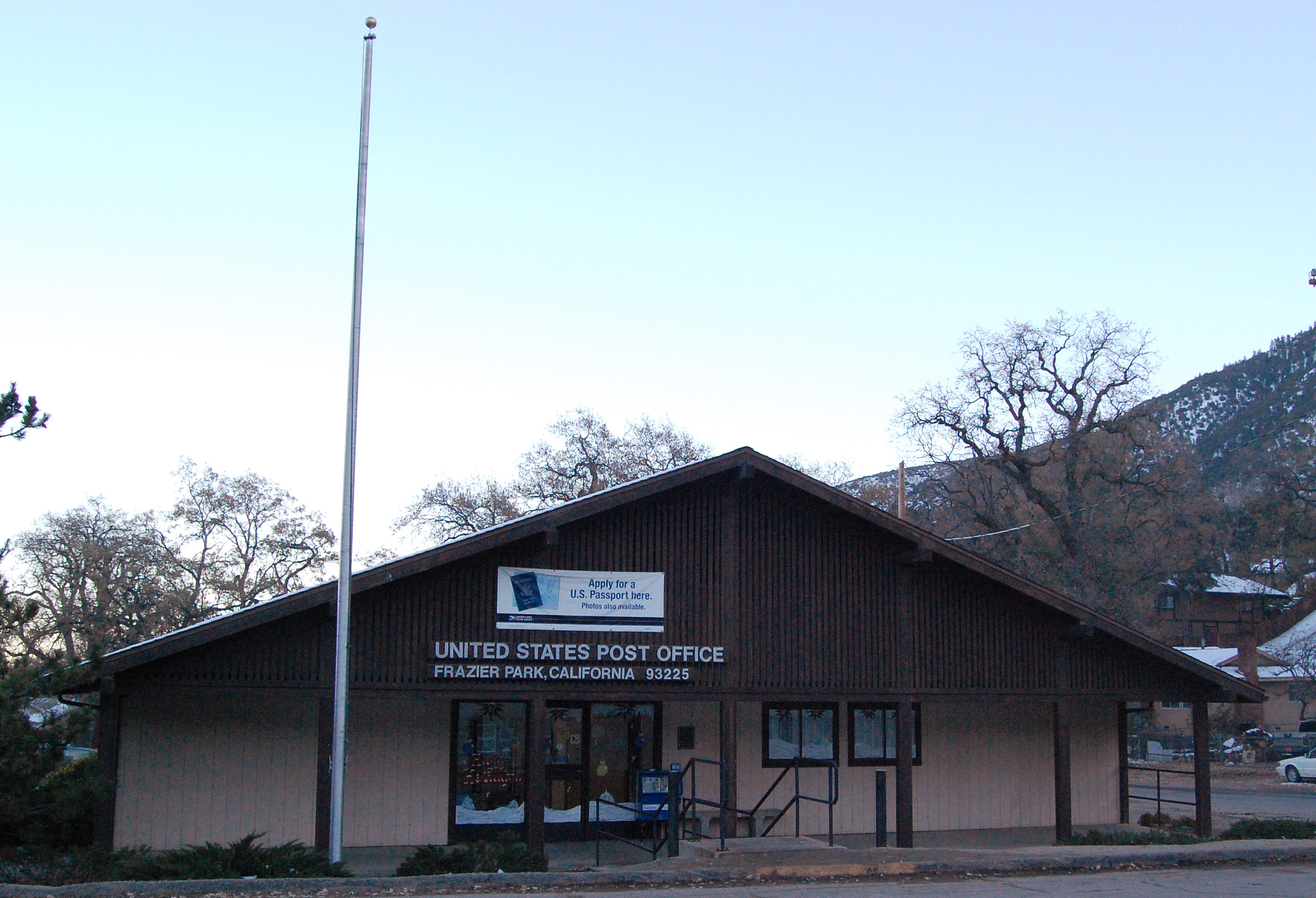
The Frazier Park Post office at Monterey Trail and Park Dr.

The San Andreas fault transects the region, turning southeast on the west side of Interstate 5, just southwest of the Frazier Park exit in what is known as the Big Bend of the San Andreas. The Garlock Fault, California's second largest, intersects the San Andreas just east of town and heads northeast along the Tehachapi Mountains.

The nearest highway is Interstate 5, east of the community. The main road through Frazier Park is Frazier Mountain Park Road, which runs east to Lebec and I-5 and west to Lake of the Woods.

=== Climate ===
This region experiences warm (but not hot) and dry summers, with no average monthly temperatures above 71.6 °F (22.0 °C). According to the Köppen Climate Classification system, Frazier Park has a warm-summer Mediterranean climate, abbreviated "Csb" on climate maps.

== Demographics ==
Historical population
Census	Pop.	Note	%±
1970	1,167		—
1980	1,444		23.7%
1990	2,201		52.4%
2000	2,348		6.7%
2010	2,691		14.6%
2020	2,592		−3.7%
U.S. Decennial Census; 1860–1870 1880-1890; 1900 1910 1920; 1930 1940 1950; 1960 1970 1980; 1990 2000 2010; 2020

Frazier Park first appeared as an unincorporated place in the 1970 U.S. census; and as a census designated place in the 1980 United States census.

=== Racial and ethnic composition ===
Frazier Park CDP, California – Racial and ethnic composition Note: the US Census treats Hispanic/Latino as an ethnic category. This table excludes Latinos from the racial categories and assigns them to a separate category. Hispanics/Latinos may be of any race.
Race / Ethnicity (NH = Non-Hispanic)	Pop 2000	Pop 2010	Pop 2020	% 2000	% 2010	% 2020
White alone (NH)	1,924	2,048	1,716	81.94%	76.11%	66.20%
Black or African American alone (NH)	14	13	19	0.60%	0.48%	0.73%
Native American or Alaska Native alone (NH)	24	16	14	1.02%	0.59%	0.54%
Asian alone (NH)	19	21	36	0.81%	0.78%	1.39%
Native Hawaiian or Pacific Islander alone (NH)	7	3	2	0.30%	0.11%	0.08%
Other race alone (NH)	6	4	11	0.26%	0.15%	0.42%
Mixed race or Multiracial (NH)	62	58	113	2.64%	2.16%	4.36%
Hispanic or Latino (any race)	292	528	681	12.44%	19.62%	26.27%
Total	2,348	2,691	2,592	100.00%	100.00%	100.00%

=== 2020 census ===
As of the 2020 census, Frazier Park had a population of 2,592. The median age was 41.9 years. 20.9% of residents were under the age of 18 and 17.3% of residents were 65 years of age or older. For every 100 females there were 100.0 males, and for every 100 females age 18 and over there were 99.9 males age 18 and over.

The racial makeup of Frazier Park was 1,865 (72.0%) White, 21 (0.8%) African American, 39 (1.5%) Native American, 38 (1.5%) Asian, 5 (0.2%) Pacific Islander, 289 (11.1%) from other races, and 335 (12.9%) from two or more races. Hispanic or Latino of any race were 681 persons (26.3%).

0.0% of residents lived in urban areas, while 100.0% lived in rural areas.

There were 1,086 households in Frazier Park, of which 25.3% had children under the age of 18 living in them. Of all households, 39.0% were married-couple households, 26.3% were households with a male householder and no spouse or partner present, and 25.1% were households with a female householder and no spouse or partner present. About 33.1% of all households were made up of individuals and 15.4% had someone living alone who was 65 years of age or older.

There were 1,385 housing units, of which 21.6% were vacant. The homeowner vacancy rate was 4.6% and the rental vacancy rate was 15.1%.

=== 2010 census ===
The 2010 United States census reported that Frazier Park had a population of 2,691. The population density was 531.2 inhabitants per square mile (205.1/km^{2}). The racial makeup of Frazier Park was 2,297 (85.4%) White, 16 (0.6%) African American, 31 (1.2%) Native American, 22 (0.8%) Asian, 3 (0.1%) Pacific Islander, 212 (7.9%) from other races, and 110 (4.1%) from two or more races. Hispanic or Latino of any race were 528 persons (19.6%).

The Census reported that 2,691 people (100% of the population) lived in households, 0 (0%) lived in non-institutionalized group quarters, and 0 (0%) were institutionalized.

There were 1,086 households, out of which 342 (31.5%) had children under the age of 18 living in them, 487 (44.8%) were opposite-sex married couples living together, 116 (10.7%) had a female householder with no husband present, 69 (6.4%) had a male householder with no wife present. There were 83 (7.6%) unmarried opposite-sex partnerships, and 7 (0.6%) same-sex married couples or partnerships. 312 households (28.7%) were made up of individuals, and 97 (8.9%) had someone living alone who was 65 years of age or older. The average household size was 2.48. There were 672 families (61.9% of all households); the average family size was 3.08.

The population included 643 people (23.9%) under the age of 18, 243 people (9.0%) aged 18 to 24, 616 people (22.9%) aged 25 to 44, 874 people (32.5%) aged 45 to 64, and 315 people (11.7%) who were 65 years of age or older. The median age was 40.4 years. For every 100 females there were 100.7 males. For every 100 females age 18 and over, there were 102.0 males.

There were 1,354 housing units at an average density of 267.3 units per square mile (103.2 units/km^{2}), of which 673 (62.0%) were owner-occupied, and 413 (38.0%) were occupied by renters. The homeowner vacancy rate was 4.5%; the rental vacancy rate was 10.0%. 1,627 people (60.5% of the population) lived in owner-occupied housing units and 1,064 people (39.5%) lived in rental housing units.

=== 2000 census ===
A total of 2,348 people lived in Frazier Park in 2000, of which 2,055 (87 percent) were white. Other residents included 34 American Indians or Alaska natives, 19 Asians, and 14 blacks. There were 292 Hispanics or Latinos of any race.

The median age for Frazier Park residents was 38 years compared with 35 for the nation as a whole.

Frazier Park also had slightly more veterans than its share — 293, or 17%, compared to 13% around the country.

It had a significantly higher percentage of disabled people than the rest of the nation — 36% vice 19%.

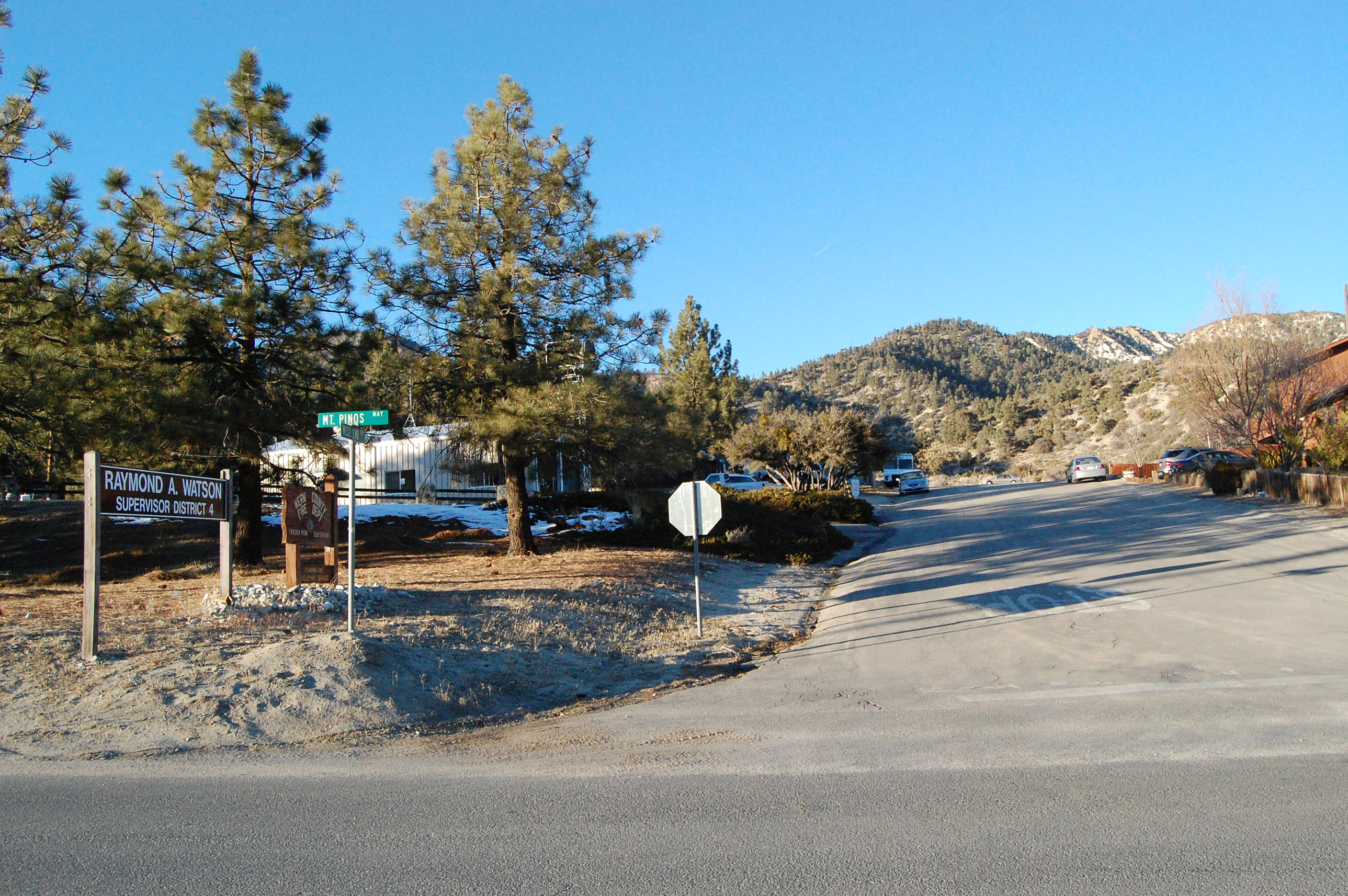
A fire station at West End Dr and Mount Pinos Way, 2007. Frazier Park is unincorporated; fire services are provided by the Kern County Fire Department.

In contrast with the country at large, where 64% of adults were working, Frazier Park had 48% employed. Those who were working had to travel some 42 minutes to their jobs, compared to 25 minutes for most Americans.

Frazier Park households had a lower median income than the nation as a whole — $46,857, compared to $50,046.

There were 291 people (12%) below the poverty level in Frazier Park in 2000. That is the same proportion as the entire country.

Almost a quarter of Frazier Park's 1,203 housing units (23%) were vacant when the census was taken in March 2000 — much higher than the national rate of 9%. This may be explained by the fact that many Frazier Park properties are second or seasonal homes. Property owners lived in about seven of every 10 occupied units, renters in the other three — nearly the same as the remainder of the nation.

== Government ==
Frazier Park is governed by the Kern County Board of Supervisors.

== Education ==
The community is a part of the El Tejon Unified School District. Frazier Park Elementary School is the only non-charter school that lies within Frazier Park; it educates children in kindergarten through fourth grade. El Tejon Middle School in Lebec takes district students from the fifth through the eighth grade. Frazier Mountain High School, also in Lebec, was founded in 1995 for ninth- through 12th-graders.

Homeschooling is important in Frazier Park and surrounding areas, according to a March 2008 report in the Mountain Enterprise, which added:

Per capita, the Mountain Communities may have one of the highest rates of homeschooling in the state, far above the national average of 2% to 4%, Holly Van Houten... [a home-school parent of the area] said. Estimates range between 8% and 30% — somewhere between 100 and 400 children, she reports.

Frazier Park hosts a branch of the Valley Oaks Community Charter School, headquartered in Bakersfield. The charter school is designed to "provide opportunities, support, and accountability for parents in their homeschooling endeavors."

== Transportation ==
Kern Transit provides weekday service from the Flying J gas station via the Route 130 bus to Bakersfield.

Kern Transit also provides bus service Monday through Saturday during the summer months to Lebec, Gorman, Lake of the Woods, Pinon Pines, and Pine Mountain Club. It offers a dial-a-ride service all year.

== Media ==
- The Mountain Enterprise, weekly newspaper
- The Bakersfield Californian

== In popular culture ==
The Black Six (1973), a blaxploitation biker film directed by Matt Cimber and featuring several NFL stars was made in the area. Several episodes of The Waltons were either filmed there or contained scenes filmed there.

Principal photography for The FP (2011) took place in Frazier Park, California in September 2008. Ron Trost — writers and directors Brandon and Jason Trost's father — served as special effects supervisor and executive producer of the film, and his property was the primary filming location.
