= Pine Mountain Club, California =

Census-designated place in California, United States

Pine Mountain Club
- Unincorporated community Census-designated place
- Location in Southwest Kern County and the state of California
- Interactive map of Pine Mountain Club
- Location in the United States Pine Mountain Club (the United States)
- Coordinates: 34°50′49″N 119°09′24″W
- Country: United States
- State: California
- County: Kern

Government
  - Mayor: Koffee
  - Senate: Shannon Grove (R)
  - Assembly: Stan Ellis (R)
  - U. S. Congress: Vince Fong (R)

Area
  - Total: 16.859 sq mi (43.664 km^{2})
  - Land: 16.852 sq mi (43.647 km^{2})
  - Water: 0.0066 sq mi (0.017 km^{2}) 0.04%
- Elevation: 5,554 ft (1,693 m)

Population (2020)
  - Total: 2,422
  - Density: 144/sq mi (55.5/km^{2})
- Time zone: UTC-8 (PST)
  - Summer (DST): UTC-7 (PDT)
- ZIP code: 93222
- Area code: 661
- FIPS code: 06-57240
- GNIS feature ID: 254419

Pine Mountain Club is an unincorporated community in southwestern Kern County, California, United States. As of the 2020 census it had a population of 2,422. For statistical purposes, the United States Census Bureau has defined Pine Mountain Club as a census-designated place (CDP). It is one of the Mountain Communities of the Tejon Pass.

== Geography ==
Pine Mountain Club has an area of 16.9 square miles (44 km^{2}). It ranges from 4,901 to 6,400 feet (1,494 to 1,951 m) in elevation. The community sits in a deep valley of the San Emigdio Mountains, on the San Andreas Fault. It is surrounded by Los Padres National Forest. The settlement lies between Apache Saddle and Pinon Pines Estates along Mil Potrero Highway. It is west of Frazier Park, Lebec, and Interstate 5.

== History ==
=== Founding and development ===
Pine Mountain Club was developed in 1971 by Tenneco. The first announcement was made from Houston, Texas, in April of that year when the company said it would develop "more than 1.1 million acres of land in Arizona and Southern California." Tenneco was the Bakersfield-based western land-development arm of Tenneco, Inc., of Houston.

About half that acreage was to be in Kern County, where the projects would include the residential development of 6,500 acres surrounding the then-new California State College near Bakersfield and 3,200 acres in the Los Padres National Forest, also mostly for residences (Pine Mountain Club).

The forest project was to set aside a thousand acres for vacation home sites and 2,200 acres "for permanent preservation in their natural state." The program was to be directed by John E. Sommerhalder, president of Tenneco West. The land was part of a 3,200-acre tract of pine forest and meadowland, formerly a private preserve.

Tenneco West was a Bakersfield subsidiary that administered all the western holdings of Tenneco, "the parent, Houston-based, multi-industry company."

Adjacent to the clubhouse will be a nine-hole executive golf course[,] and other recreational facilities are a heated swimming pool, archery range, volleyball and basketball courts, a lake stocked with fish and a community barbecue area.

Tenneco West President Sommerhalder said the club was believed to be among the largest all-electric family recreational resorts in California. Three kinds of "vacation or weekend homesites" were to be offered: (1) One- to three-bedroom dwellings, (2) modular homes, and (3) space for mobile homes.

Hiking trails, bridle trails (16 miles marked for from one-hour to all-day rides), an equestrian center with 10-stall barn, tack room, riding ring and corrals for boarding horses also will be available. . . . Later this year, a general store and laundromat will be added.

The prices were estimated to begin from about $13,500 for a one-bedroom house and lot.

At the time of the announcement in 1971, "four deep wells" had already been sunk and an "extensive network of reservoirs and pipelines" laid, with a filtration plant near the commercial center.

Sommerhalder said the developer had the "assistance of Simon Eisner, nationally known environmental planner."

Eight months after the opening, seventy-nine percent of the 1,309 purchasers indicated in a survey that construction of a vacation home was the prime reason for buying a lot and 43% of that group said they intended to start building during 1972.

The development's sixth and final section, on a plateau some thousand feet higher than the clubhouse, went on sale in March 1973.

=== Mil Potrero Highway ===
Tenneco West improved a "winding, steep, one-lane dirt road" called Mil Potrero west from Pine Mountain Club to California State Highway 33 into a "comfortable, convenient and safe way . . . to view what is generally regarded as Southern California's most strikingly beautiful scene." The cost for the 6.5-mile segment was estimated at nearly a million dollars. John E. Sommerhalder, the company president, said the road opened up "a large segment of the [Los Padres National] forest that, until now, has been almost inaccessible."

The job was unusually difficult, partly because of the mountainous terrain and partly because of protective and restorative measures taken to reduce to a minimum the disturbance to the natural surroundings. . . . The project had to conform to the specifications and requirements of both Kern County and the U.S. Forest Service. In effect, it is already a public road, although Tenneco must maintain it for a year before the formal dedication as a public road can take place.

To keep damages to the forest at a minimum, contractors Yeager Construction of Riverside and Desert Construction of Victorville were required to do all the work from the existing right-of-way and forbidden to build a temporary construction road alongside. Fire-protection equipment had to be on hand at all times.

=== Fruition ===
By 1988, Pine Mountain Club had a small commercial district with about forty businesses, ranging from an Exxon gas station to a place called "Pheasants by Frank." According to the Newhall Signal, the district was "more or less shut down on Mondays and Tuesdays . . . because there are so many people with weekend homes that the stores choose to stay open Saturday and Sunday."

On July 31, 2021, the community celebrated its fiftieth birthday with a barbecue picnic on blankets spread beneath the trees next to the golf course. Also noted was the 50th anniversary of the founding of the Mil Potrero Mutual Water Company.

== Demographics ==
Historical population
Census	Pop.	Note	%±
2000	1,600		—
2010	2,315		44.7%
2020	2,422		4.6%
U.S. Decennial Census; 1860–1870 1880-1890; 1900 1910 1920; 1930 1940 1950; 1960 1970 1980; 1990 2000 2010; 2020

Pine Mountain Club first appeared as a census designated place in the 2000 U.S. census.

=== Racial and ethnic composition ===
Pine Mountain Club CDP, California – Racial and ethnic composition Note: the US Census treats Hispanic/Latino as an ethnic category. This table excludes Latinos from the racial categories and assigns them to a separate category. Hispanics/Latinos may be of any race.
Race / Ethnicity (NH = Non-Hispanic)	Pop 2000	Pop 2010	Pop 2020	% 2000	% 2010	% 2020
White alone (NH)	1,366	1,939	1,768	85.38%	83.76%	73.00%
Black or African American alone (NH)	9	28	30	0.56%	1.21%	1.24%
Native American or Alaska Native alone (NH)	16	21	20	1.00%	0.91%	0.83%
Asian alone (NH)	11	40	61	0.69%	1.73%	2.52%
Native Hawaiian or Pacific Islander alone (NH)	7	0	3	0.44%	0.00%	0.12%
Other race alone (NH)	0	2	12	0.00%	0.09%	0.50%
Mixed race or Multiracial (NH)	45	54	132	2.81%	2.33%	5.45%
Hispanic or Latino (any race)	146	231	396	9.13%	9.98%	16.35%
Total	1,600	2,315	2,422	100.00%	100.00%	100.00%

=== 2020 census ===
As of the 2020 census, Pine Mountain Club had a population of 2,422 and a population density of 143.7 inhabitants per square mile (55.5/km^{2}). The median age was 56.3 years. The age distribution was 13.2% under the age of 18, 3.8% aged 18 to 24, 18.8% aged 25 to 44, 33.6% aged 45 to 64, and 30.7% who were 65 years of age or older. For every 100 females there were 102.3 males, and for every 100 females age 18 and over there were 101.1 males age 18 and over.

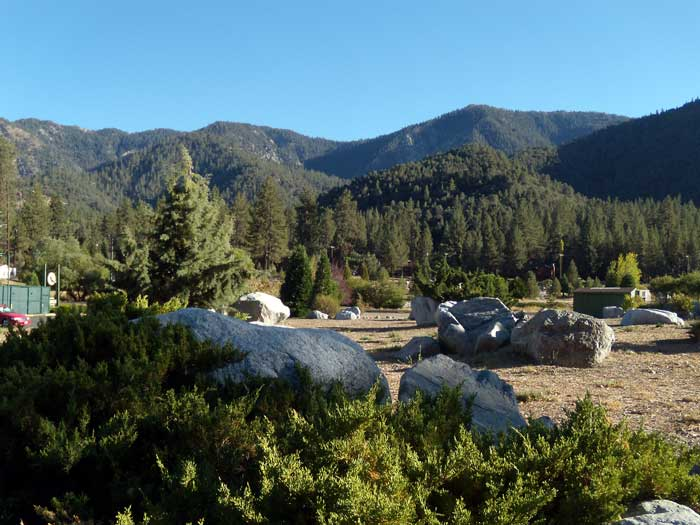
Pine Mountain Club and the Los Padres National Forest

The census reported that 99.7% of the population lived in households, 0.3% lived in non-institutionalized group quarters, and no one was institutionalized. 0.0% of residents lived in urban areas, while 100.0% lived in rural areas.

There were 1,212 households, out of which 15.4% included children under the age of 18, 44.8% were married-couple households, 5.6% were cohabiting couple households, 25.7% had a female householder with no spouse or partner present, and 23.8% had a male householder with no spouse or partner present. 35.9% of households were one person, and 18.1% were one person aged 65 or older. The average household size was 1.99. There were 716 families (59.1% of all households).

There were 2,199 housing units at an average density of 130.5 units per square mile (50.4 units/km^{2}). Of these, 1,212 (55.1%) were occupied and 987 (44.9%) were vacant. The homeowner vacancy rate was 5.5% and the rental vacancy rate was 9.1%. Of occupied units, 82.6% were owner-occupied and 17.4% were occupied by renters.

=== 2010 census ===
The 2010 United States census reported that Pine Mountain Club had a population of 2,315. The population density was 137.3 inhabitants per square mile (53.0/km^{2}). The racial makeup was 2,079 (89.8%) white, 29 (1.3%) African American, 25 (1.1%) Native American, 45 (1.9%) Asian, 0 (0.0%) Pacific Islander, 58 (2.5%) from other races, and 79 (3.4%) from two or more races. Hispanic or Latino of any race were 231 persons (10.0%).

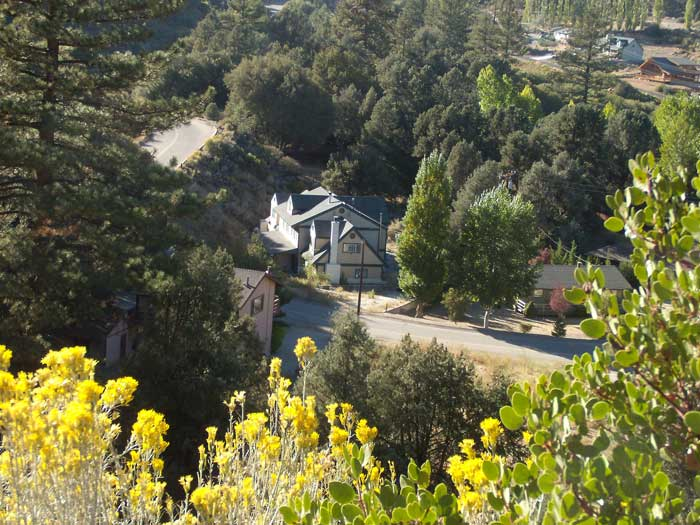
Residences of the area

There were 1,062 households, of which 226 (21.3%) had children under the age of 18 living in them, 585 (55.1%) were opposite-sex married couples living together, 62 (5.8%) had a female householder with no husband present, and 36 (3.4%) had a male householder with no wife present. There were 49 (4.6%) unmarried opposite-sex partnerships, and 13 (1.2%) same-sex married couples or partnerships. Three hundred eighteen households (29.9%) were made up of individuals, and 111 (10.5%) had someone living alone who was 65 years of age or older. The average household size was 2.18. There were 683 families (64.3% of all households); the average family size was 2.68 persons.

Four hundred eleven people (17.8%) were under the age of 18, 105 were (4.5%) aged 18 to 24, 355 (15.3%) aged 25 to 44, 929 (40.1%) aged 45 to 64, and 515 (22.2%) 65 years or older. The median age was 51.6 years. For every 100 females, there were 102.9 males. For every 100 women age 18 and over, there were 103.2 men.

There were 2,181 housing units at an average density of 129.4 per square mile (50.0/km^{2}), of which 880 (82.9%) were owner-occupied, and 182 (17.1%) were renter-occupied. The homeowner vacancy rate was 6.1%; the rental vacancy rate was 17.8%. Exactly 1,884 people (81.4% of the population) lived in owner-occupied housing units and 431 (18.6%) in rentals.

== Community management ==
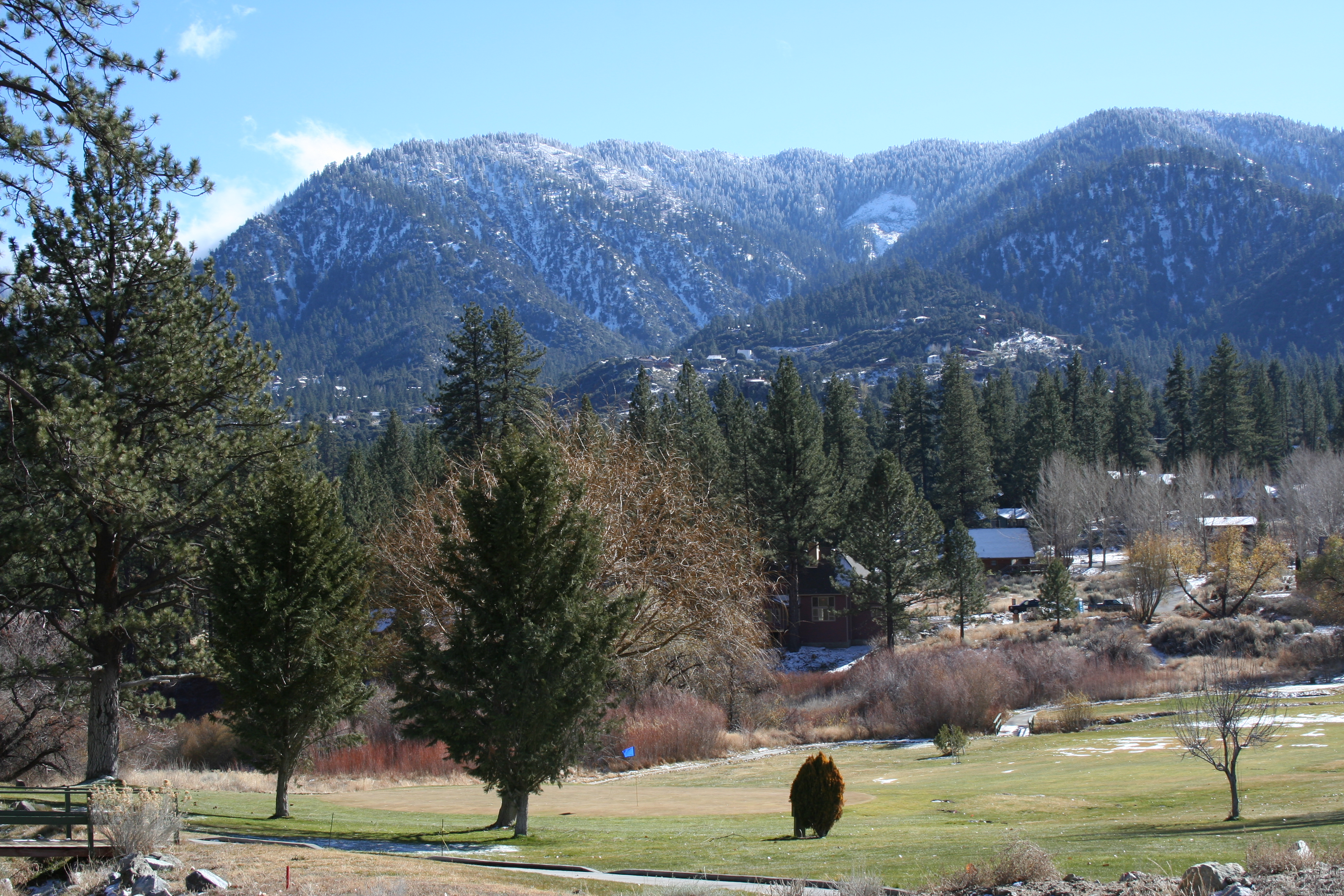
PMC golf course, with Mt. Pinos in the background

The PMC community is managed by the Pine Mountain Club Property Owners Association, Inc., which is governed by a nine-member volunteer board of directors and a group of documents: the Covenants, Conditions, and Restrictions (CC&R's ), bylaws, the association rules, and an Environmental Control (EC) code . The association maintains several recreational facilities , including a nine-hole golf course, pool, clubhouse, and stables. It manages the Pine Mountain Patrol and publishes a monthly newspaper, the Condor .

== Education ==
Pine Mountain Club is part of the El Tejon Unified School District, and students are transported by bus to local public schools, including Frazier Mountain High School. The community hosts a charter school, Peak to Peak Mountain Charter, serving grades kindergarten through seventh.

== Transportation ==
Kern Regional Transit provides bus service Thursdays and Saturdays during the summer to Frazier Park, Gorman, Lake of the Woods, Lebec, and Pinon Pines. It offers a dial-a-ride service all year. Connections can be made in Frazier Park or Lebec to a scheduled service to Grapevine and Bakersfield and further connection there to Greyhound and Amtrak.

== Economy ==
The area is served by the Mountain Communities Chamber of Commerce.

== Wildlife ==
Black bears began commonly disturbing the community by breaking into homes and vehicles around 2014. Considered a human-black bear conflict zone by wildlife authorities, the issue is a challenge for the community especially when the bears emerge from their winter hibernation to search for food in the spring.

== Media ==
- The Mountain Enterprise
- Bakersfield Californian The Californian discontinued circulation in the Mountain Communities effective May 1, 2009. Source: Mountain Enterprise, April 3, 2009

== Picture gallery ==
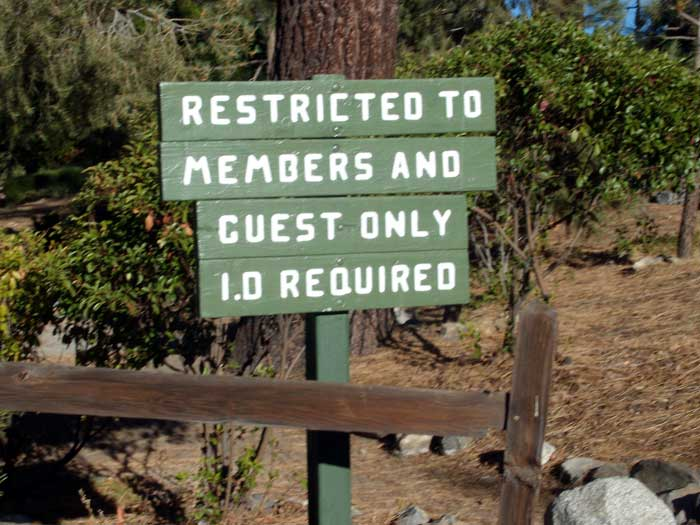

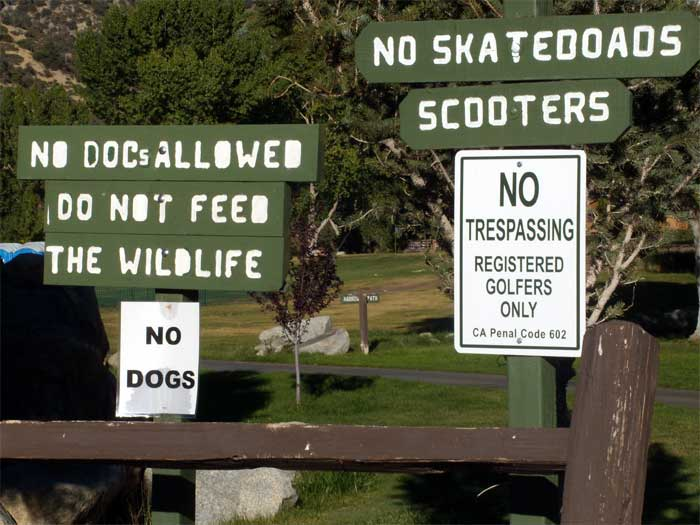

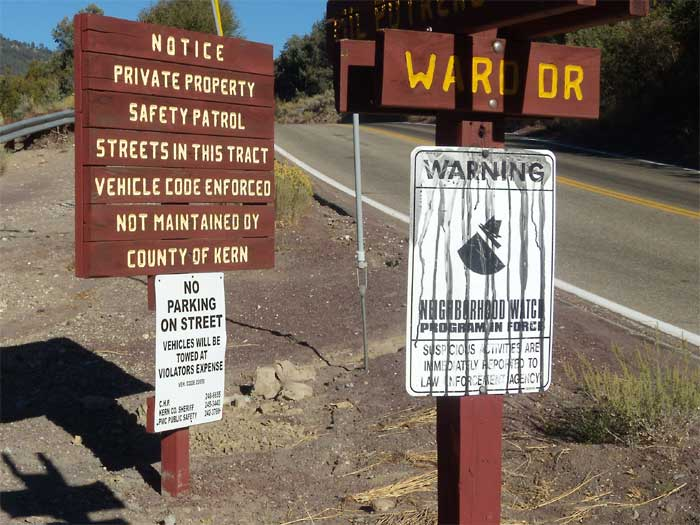

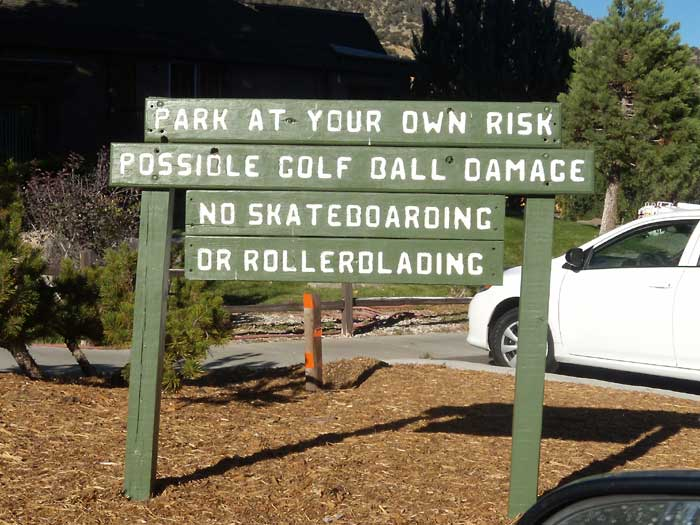
Pine Mountain Club is a private community.
Click the images to see larger versions of the photos, all from 2008.
