= Willow Springs Canyon =

Canyon of the Sierra Pelona in Los Angeles County, California

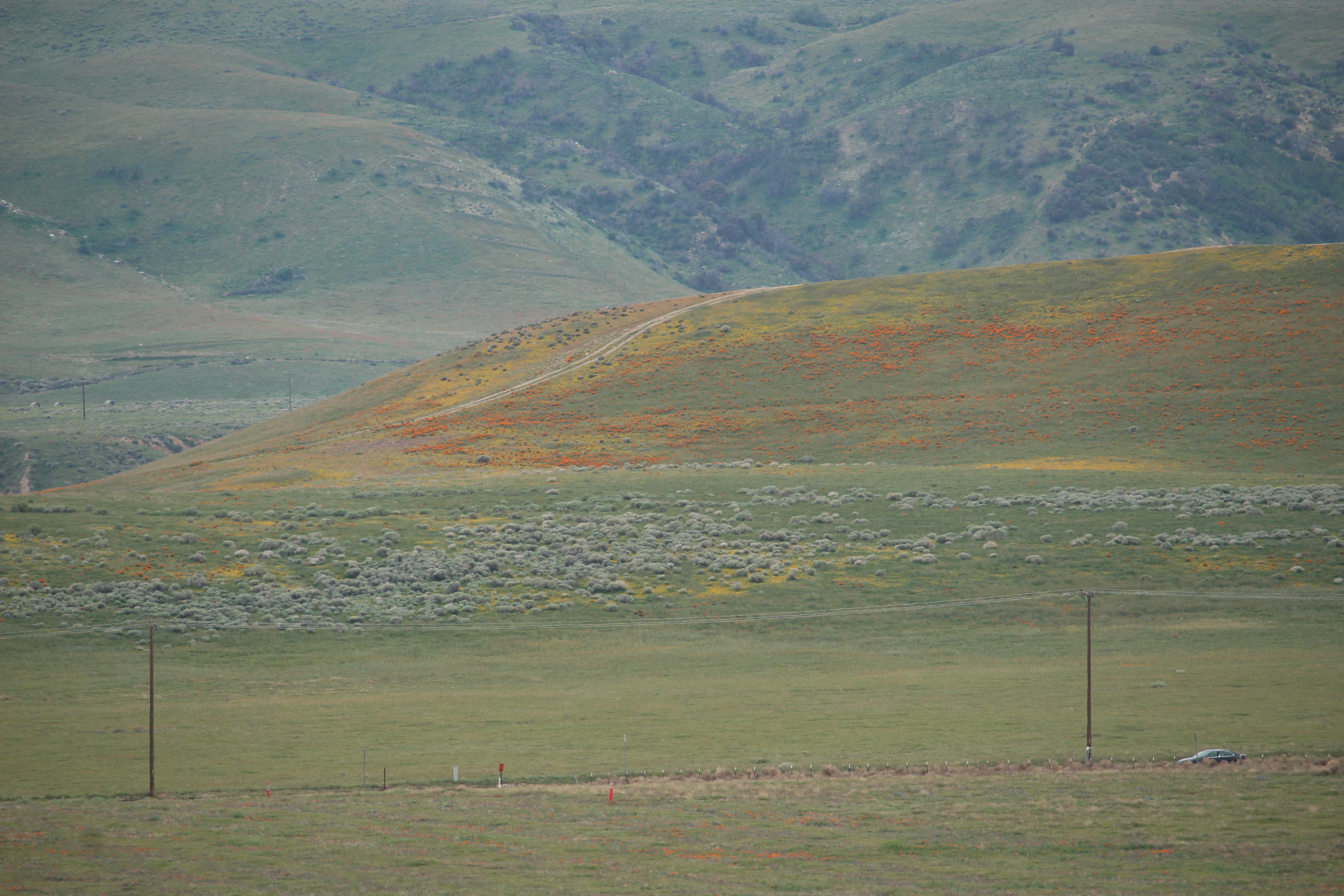
- Myrick Canyon in Portal Ridge two miles west of Willow Springs Canyon.

- Location within southern California
- Length: 2.9 miles (4.7 km)

Geography
- Location: Los Angeles County, California
- Coordinates: 34°42′34″N 118°21′17″W
- Interactive map of Willow Springs Canyon

Willow Springs Canyon is a canyon cut by Willow Springs Canyon Wash. Its source is at the head of the canyon in the gap in the Portal Ridge of the Transverse Range, 0.5 miles north of Elizabeth Lake. It is cut into the slope to the northeast into the Antelope Valley, crossing the California Aqueduct. The mouth of the Canyon is 0.25 miles southwest of its confluence with Myrick Canyon Wash which is 300 feet southwest of the intersection of Munz Ranch Road with the Neenach - Fairmont Road in Los Angeles County, California, USA.

The closest populated place to Willow Springs Canyon is Elizabeth Lake, California.

== History ==
Several early California roads passed through Willow Springs Canyon. The first was El Camino Viejo, established by the Spanish and later used by the Californios, which passed from Elizabeth Lake through the canyon before tuning northwest to Mud Spring and Cow Springs before running west to what is now Tejon Pass.

Next was the 49er route from Los Angeles which followed that route to Mud Springs, then turned directly north across the Antelope Valley to Cottonwood Creek, following it up the east slope of the Tehachapi Mountains to cross them at the old Tejon Pass, where it descended the west slope into the canyon of Tejon Creek, which the road followed down through Rancho El Tejon into the San Joaquin Valley and then north to the gold fields on the route that became the Stockton - Los Angeles Road.

The wagons on the Stockton - Los Angeles Road passed along the El Camino Viejo route through Tejon Pass then turned down Grapevine Canyon past Fort Tejon into the San Joaquin Valley and the Old Tejon Pass route fell out of general use but it was favored by outlaws.
