= Stickneys Ferry =

Coordinates: 35.8147°N 118.9283°W

Stickneys Ferry was a settlement established in what became Tulare County, California, United States. The ferry proper was where the Stockton - Los Angeles Stagecoach Road crossed the White River. The settlement was on Telegraph Flat, just below the confluence of the White River and Tyler Gulch, approximately 4.66 miles west of Tailholt.

It would have been established after Robert S. Williamson's 1853-4 report of his expedition for the Pacific Railroad Surveys, which does not mention it, and before the 1857 production of Britton and Rey's Map of California, which does. The ferry transported passengers and cargo travelling on what became the Stockton - Los Angeles Road across the White River. This crossing was on the Butterfield Overland Mail route, south of Fountain Springs and north of Mountain House at Willow Springs in Kern County and was probably founded sometime between 1854 and 1856 to ferry supplies to prospectors involved in the Kern River Gold Rush.

== See also ==
- List of ghost towns in California
