= Sebastian Indian Reservation =

Sebastian Indian Reservation (Tejon Indian Reservation)
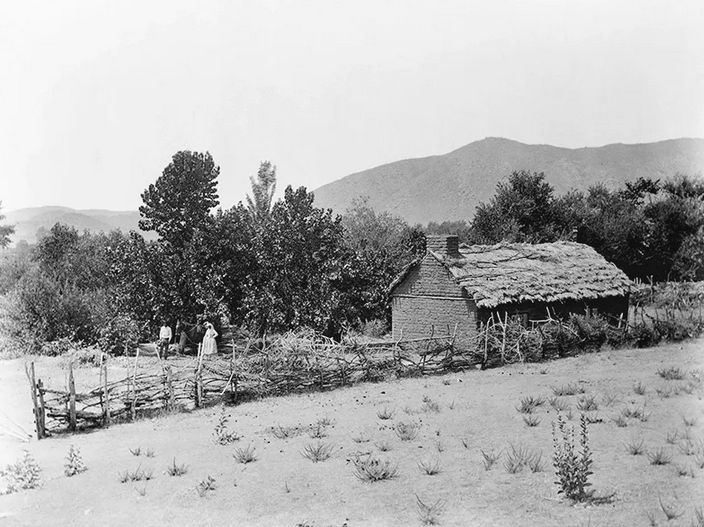
- Sebastian Indian Reservation home in 1899
- Interactive map of Sebastian Indian Reservation (Tejon Indian Reservation)
- 34.9413°N 118.9325°W
- Location: Tehachapi Mountains, Kern County, California

History
- Built: 1853
- Demolished: 1864

California Historical Landmark
- Official name: Sebastian Indian Reservation
- Designated: January 31, 1934
- Reference no.: 133

The Sebastian Indian Reservation (1853–1864), more commonly known as the Tejon Indian Reservation, was formerly at the southwestern corner of the San Joaquin Valley in the Tehachapi Mountains, in southern central California.

It was located in the southwestern Tehachapis, from Tejon Creek and Tejon Canyon, west to Grapevine Canyon (Canada de las Uvas).

== History ==
=== Establishment ===
Edward F. Beale, the federal Superintendent of Indian Affairs for California, established this as the first Indian reservation in California in 1853.

The 75,000-acre Tejon Reservation (30,000 ha) was within the private Rancho El Tejón Mexican land grant. Beale hoped if the land claims were upheld the land could be purchased by the federal government. To gain support for his efforts, Beale named the reservation after United States Senator William K. Sebastian of Arkansas, Chairman of the Indian Affairs Committee. He supported Beale's plans to form a series of reservations, garrisoned by a military post, on government owned land.

The Indians were to support themselves by farming. Throughout the reservation's existence, drought, insects, and crop disease undermined the attempts at farming. The newly constructed Stockton – Los Angeles Road, replacing El Camino Viejo, skirted the western and northern sides of the reservation.

The reservation became operational in September 1853, and some California Indians moved in voluntarily. Among the tribes of Mission Indians the reservation held, were 300 Emigdiano Chumash, whose homeland had included Tejon Canyon. In 1854, Lieutenant Beale reported that 2,500 Indians were living on the Sebastian Reservation.

In 1854, Fort Tejon was built 25 miles (40 km) to the southwest, to protect both the reservation's Indians and white settlers in the region from raids by the Paiutes, Chemeheui, Mohave peoples, and other Indian groups of the desert regions to the east. It was also to control the Indians who were living on the Tejon Reservation, and protect them from attacks by American immigrants and settlers.

=== Operations ===
Farm equipment, cattle and sheep were brought to Tejon Reservation, and a staff of white employees hired to teach the Indians agriculture and supervise their activities. Hundreds of acres of land were plowed and planted with wheat, barley, and corn. Tejon Creek irrigated gardens, vineyards, and orchards. From the forest in upper Tejon Canyon Indians hauled timber from which they sawed the lumber needed at the reservation. Additionally there was wild game to hunt for in the Tehachapi Mountains and the San Joaquin Valley. In that year the Indians gathered an abundant wheat harvest.

In early 1854, with political change in Washington, Beale's detractors charged him with embezzlement of government funds. Settlers in the San Joaquin Valley resented the agricultural competition from the Indians, and claimed that too much land had been set aside for them. He was removed from his office, but was exonerated of the charges.

Colonel Thomas J. Henley, was Beale's replacement as Superintendent of Indian Affairs for California. When Henley took charge, he noted only 800 Indians, with fewer than 350 present at one time, and only 1,500 acres under cultivation, indicating that numbers of Indians and amount of acreage under cultivation had been inflated by Beale. Henley established other reservations in California, and appointed Colonel James R. Vineyard as the resident agent at the Sebastian Reservation.

In 1855, some of the reservation's Indian residents fled, and Vineyard requested assistance from Fort Tejon to find them and force their return. The fort's commander refused, stating their role was to protect the Indians and punish any that committed hostile acts, but not return Indians that voluntarily resided on the reservation.

In 1856, rainfall was sparse but the harvest was enough for the 700 inhabitants that remained. A flour mill, granary, storehouse, and dwellings for the resident agent and the chiefs were built. A physician was also provided. In November 1856, the reservation was reduced to 25,000 acres. For 1856, the 700 Indians were reported as having 700 acres under cultivation.

In 1857, drought continued, resulting in crop failure except were irrigation reached them and those grapevines and fruit trees that began to yield a harvest. The Indians were also encouraged to collect wild food during the winter. Despite that setback, new buildings were constructed and new arrivals increased the population to over 1,000.

A post office was established at the reservation in September 1858, but it was moved in 1859 to Sinks of Tejon Station, one of the stagecoach stations of the Butterfield Overland Mail. By 1858, nearly all of the remaining inhabitants were living in houses. Several families were raising livestock, and the women had learned to make American style clothing.

By 1859, Henley had been replaced as Superintendent of Indian Affairs for California.

Finally, the winter of 1861–1862 was very wet causing Great Flood of 1862. It did break the 5-year drought, so the Reservation's Indians planted larger fields of grain, and there was a productive harvest during 1862. Additional Indians were encouraged to settle at the Sebastian Reservation, beyond the thirteen hundred that already lived there.

During the 1863 drought year, all the crops were lost except for 30 tons of hay. Settlers encroached on the Tejon Reservation's unsurveyed and unfenced land, with their cattle and sheep eating reservation crops.

=== Demise ===
Meanwhile, by 1863 former agent Edward F. Beale had purchased five contiguous ranchos in the Tejon area, which included the Tejon Reservation land, and was raising 100,000 sheep. In 1863, he offered to lease 12,000 acres to the government, but withdrew the offer when he found that the government planned to move Owens Valley Paiute Indians there. He noted that he had made the offer only because Indians already on the reservation were his friends.

In the summer of 1863, over 900 Owens Valley Paiute were marched through the Mojave Desert towards the Tejon Reservation, following their capitulation in the Owens Valley Indian War. They ended up in the Tule River Indian Reservation.

The reservation was ordered closed in June 1864. Fort Tejon was also abandoned in 1864.

Jose Pacheco, a Tejón leader, wrote to General Wright on April 16, 1864:

"I should not have troubled you with this letter, Dear General, did I not think the agents here had wronged us. You and our great father at Washington do not know how bad we fare, or you would give us food or let us go back to our lands where we can get plenty of fish and game. I do not think we get the provisions intended for us by our Great Father; the agents keep it from us, and sell it to make themselves rich, while we and our children are very poor and hungry and naked."

On July 11, Austin Wiley wrote: "I have the honor to inform you that all the Indians on the Tejon Farm and in the vicinity of Fort Tejon, some two hundred in number, have been removed from there to the Tule River farm." Wiley noted that there was no food for the Indians at Tejon.

Shortly thereafter, D. N. Cooley, Commissioner of Indian Affairs, summarized the reasons for the reservation's failure:

"The lack of legal title to the land severely restrained investment in construction and development, leaving the reserve and the Indians on it in a state of constant uncertainty. The ideal of converting Indians from food gathering to settled agriculture was never realized."

== California Historical Landmarks ==
- The Sebastian Indian Reservation California Historical Landmark number 133, signed January 31, 1934, reads:

NO. 133 SEBASTIAN INDIAN RESERVATION - The Sebastian or Tejón Indian Reservation (headquarters ten miles east of here) was established in 1853 by General Edward Fitzgerald Beale as one of several California reservations. The number of Indians quartered here varied from 500 to 2,000. General Beale acquired title to this area under Mexican land grant of 1843. In 1864 the U.S. government transferred the Indians to other reservations.

- Rose Station also called Vaquero camp, also called Rancho Canoa is a California Historical Landmark signed May, 1, 1939.

The Rose Station California Historical Landmark reads:

NO. 300 Rose Station - From 1853 to 1875 this site, originally a vaquero camp of the Sebastian Indian Reservation, was known as Rancho Canoa (trough). In 1875, Wm. B. Rose built an adobe stage station on the site of the Overland Mail way station established 1858. Rose Station was a stockmen's headquarters, post office, and polling place.

Both markers are located at Grapevine Road and 'D' Street 70 miles south of Mettler, California.

== See also ==
- Chumash people
- Tejon Indian Tribe of California
- Tule River Indian Tribe of the Tule River Reservation
- Indigenous peoples of California
- California Historical Landmarks in Kern County
- California Historical Landmark
