= Neenach, California =

Unincorporated community in California, United States

- Unincorporated community
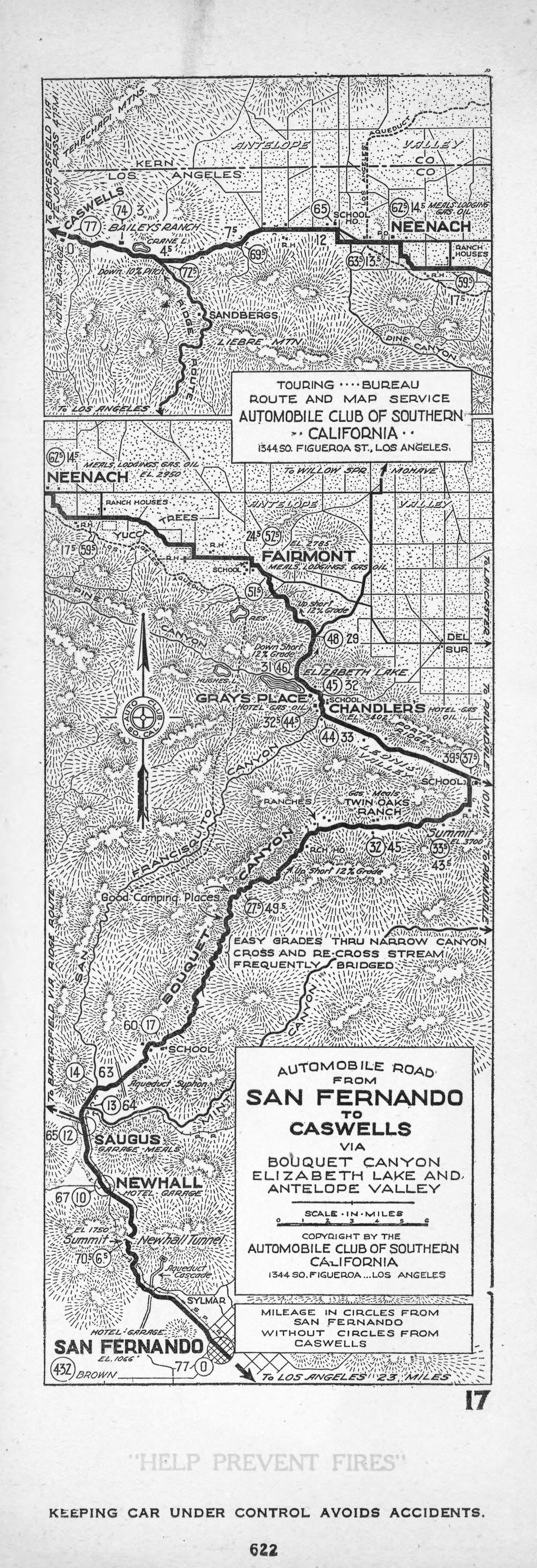
- Automobile road from San Fernando to Caswells via Bouquet Canyon, Elizabeth Lake and Antelope Valley, 1922

- Location of Neenach in Los Angeles County, California

- Location within California Location within the United States
- Coordinates: 34°46′33″N 118°34′06″W
- Country: United States
- State: California
- County: Los Angeles
- Elevation: 2,956 ft (901 m)
- Time zone: UTC-8 (Pacific (PST))
  - Summer (DST): UTC-7 (PDT)
- ZIP Code: 93536
- Area code: 661
- GNIS feature ID: 1669887

Neenach (/ˈniːnæk/ NEE-nak) is an agricultural settlement in northwestern Los Angeles County, California, United States, with a population of about 800. It is facing a massive change with the proposed construction of a 23,000-home planned community to its north called Centennial.

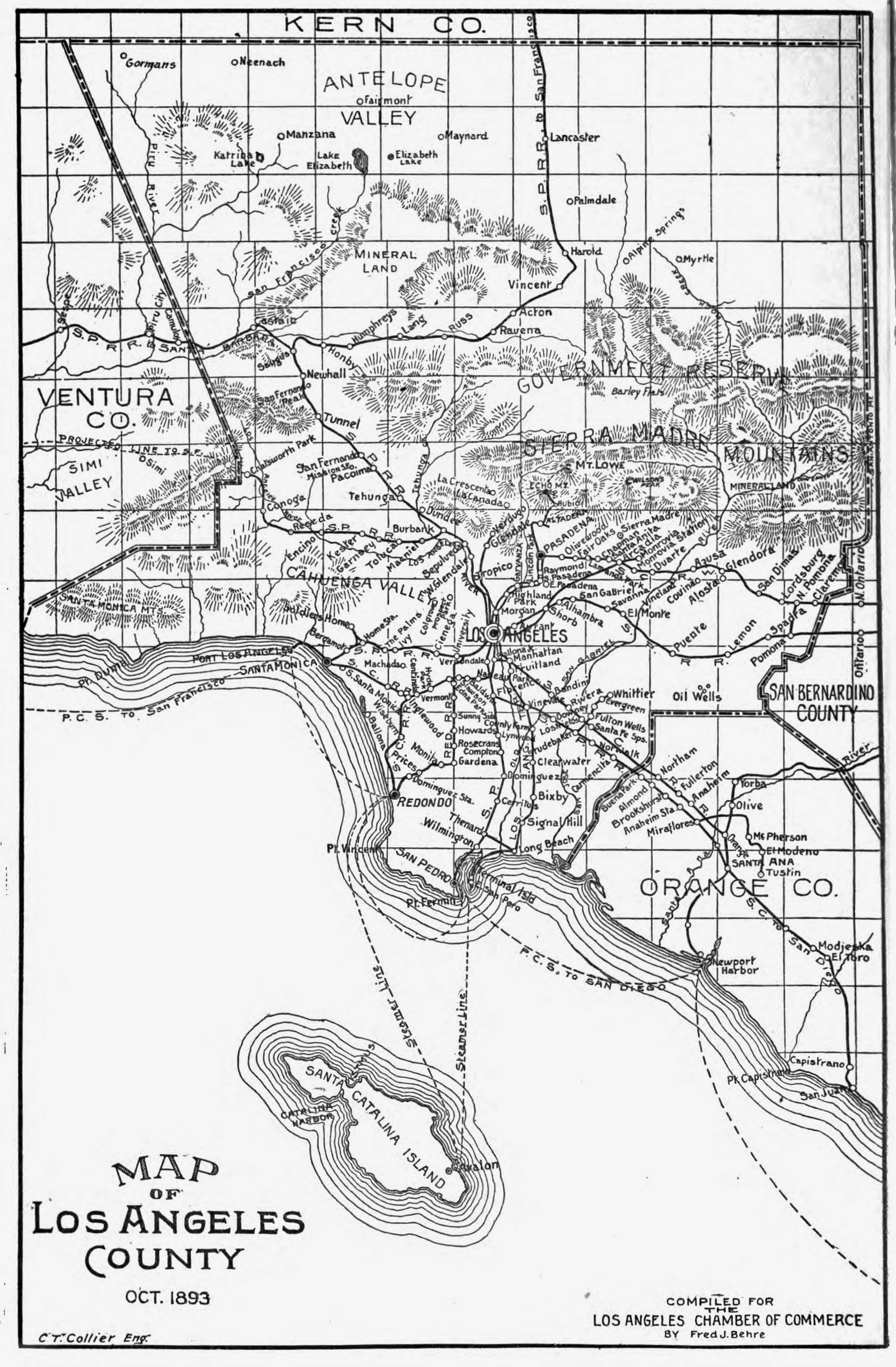
Neenach on a map of Los Angeles County published October 1893 for the World's Columbian Exposition

== Geography and climate ==
Neenach is 34 miles (55 km) northwest of Lancaster in the Antelope Valley portion of Southern California. It is 15 miles (24 km) southeast of Gorman and north of the Sierra Pelona Mountains, and 75 miles (121 km) from the county seat in Downtown Los Angeles. This region experiences hot and dry summers.

== History ==
=== Early names ===
The original name for present day Neenach is puyutsiwamǝŋ. This is in the Kitanemuk language. The Spanish referred to it as Ojo de la Vaca.

=== Cow Springs and French John's Station ===
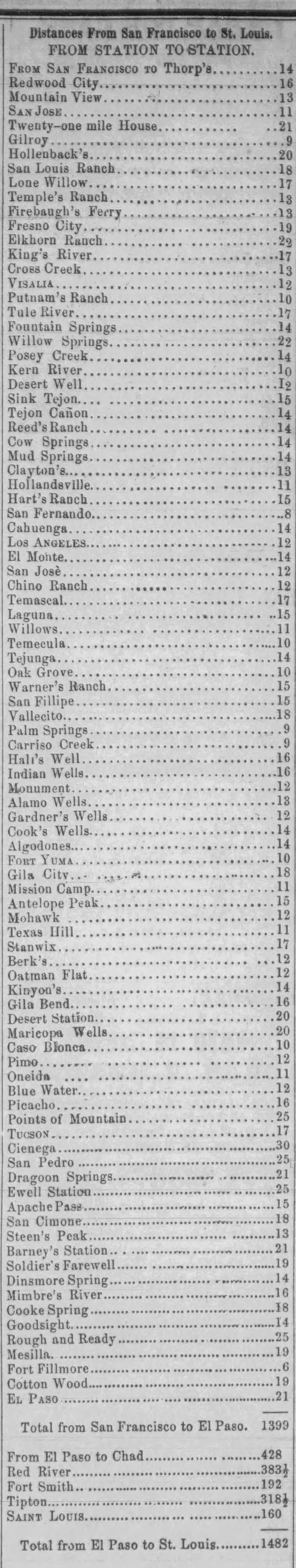
Cow Springs and other overland stage stops in the Far West in 1860

A 19th century name for the area was Cow Springs (34.77273°N 118.62134°W), about a mile southwest of today's Neenach School. El Camino Viejo, the Old Road to Los Angeles, passed from Laguna Chico Lopez north via Willow Springs Canyon, then west to the water at Aquaje Lodoso, then to Cow Springs and on to Tejon Pass. Later a shorter route was followed by the Stockton - Los Angeles Road and the Butterfield Overland Mail between Elizabeth Lake and Gorman. Instead of going north-south, travelers went east-west via the San Andreas Rift and Oakgrove Canyon, and north-south via Pine Canyon, Antelope Valley and Cow Springs. French Johns Station, 14 miles (23 km) east of Gorman near Cow Springs, provided a way station for the stage line, teamsters and other travelers.

In 1888, Cow Springs was described as "a pleasant camping-place with willow trees, casting an inviting shade to the weary traveler" with a "pure, cold, limpid stream which came bubbling up from its earthen reservoir and went gaily dancing down to the thirsty soil that encompassed it about".

=== Establishment ===
Neenach itself was founded in the 1870s by Danish settlers from Neenah, Wisconsin. In 1888, a post office was established, with John A. Coovert as the first postmaster. In September 1905 Christian Clausen was named postmaster.

James Barnes filed a homestead claim for 160 acres (647,000 m²) at present-day State Route 138 and 300th Street West in 1887. He had a county contract to maintain and improve roads in the Antelope Valley as far as Three Points.

Construction of the Los Angeles Aqueduct between 1905 and 1913, which brought water from the distant Owens Valley to the San Fernando Valley, was important to the area.

On July 13, 1917, Chief Water Engineer William Mulholland of the city of Los Angeles, the builder of the aqueduct, received word that the line had been broken. He went to Neenach and found a 60-foot rupture (18 m). He ordered additional surveillance, which saw the arrest of one man, an employee of the rival Los Angeles Gas and Electric Company. The suspect was later released.

James Anderson, father in law of James Barnes' son Roy, became a line rider or patrolman on the aqueduct: He had to shut down the tunnel periodically to check its condition. He also checked the surface to verify that none of the aqueduct's opponents had damaged it. Harry Womersley, from England by way of Illinois, was another resident who worked on the aqueduct – the 12 miles (19 km) from Fairmont to Neenach.

Gold was discovered in the hills south of the community in the early 1930s. The "Oh Suzanna" mine produced some $7 million over the few years of its operation. Another account says that total gold production from the Neenach mining district was $200,000.

In the 1970s, Neenach was lively, one resident told a reporter. There were community-wide potluck dinners and almost 80 members in the local 4-H Club. Since then, he said, many of the kids moved away as soon as they were able.

== Proposed development ==
…the truly rural outposts of Los Angeles County – the nation's top agricultural county not so long ago – are withering away. And this one happens to abut the proposed site of the largest planned community in county history.

— Scott Gold, Los Angeles Times

A portion of nearby Tejon Ranch called Centennial is proposed to be a 23,000-home master-planned community adjacent to Neenach. Civic squares, parks, shops, three fire stations, and other services are proposed. Children would be encouraged to walk to one of the eight elementary schools planned. The promoters have pledged to create 30,000 local jobs. On average, a new house would be erected every eight hours, seven days a week, for 20 years.

The Tucson, Arizona,-based Center for Biological Diversity opposes the project – claiming that Centennial would be built on rare ecosystems, including the largest native grassland left in California.

== Services ==
=== Library ===
The Los Angeles County Library's Antelope Valley bookmobile is at the Neenach market on Saturdays from 11 to noon.

=== Schools ===
The school closed a few years back when they ran out of kids, and its rose-painted walls are still the brightest thing on the prairie.

— Scott Gold

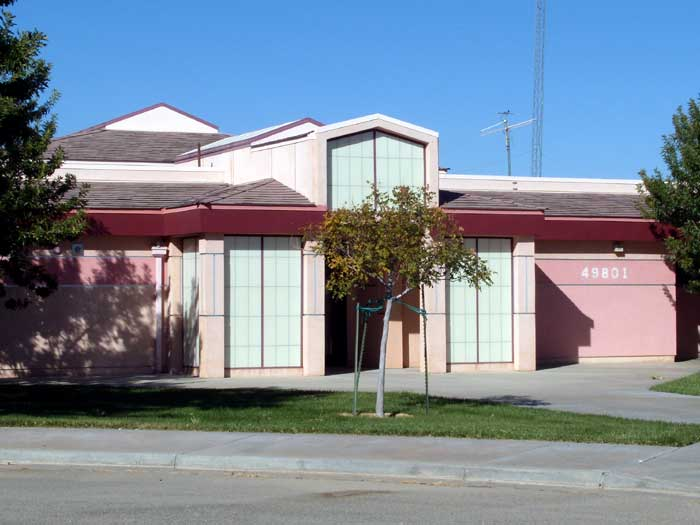
Neenach Elementary School, shown in 2008, had no students but was kept in good condition.

The present Neenach School building was opened in 1993 to replace an older building that had stood for decades on a neighboring lot. The school was closed in 2001 because of dwindling population and high heating costs; lack of a natural-gas source meant the school was all-electric. Sixty-six pupils were enrolled the previous year.

Neenach is part of the Westside Union School District of West Lancaster, which also operates Del Sur, Joe Walker, Hill View, Cottonwood, Rancho Vista, Sundown, Valley View, Leona Valley, and Quartz Hill schools, through the eighth grade.

The community is within the Antelope Valley Union High School District and the Antelope Valley Community College District.

== Natural phenomena ==
=== Volcanic formations ===
The Neenach Volcanic Formations, about 23.5 million years old, are a series of igneous intrusions next to Old Post Road paralleling Interstate 5 near Gorman, California. Plate movement along the San Andreas Fault split the formations and moved half of them about two hundred miles north into what is now Pinnacles National Park.

=== Meteorite ===
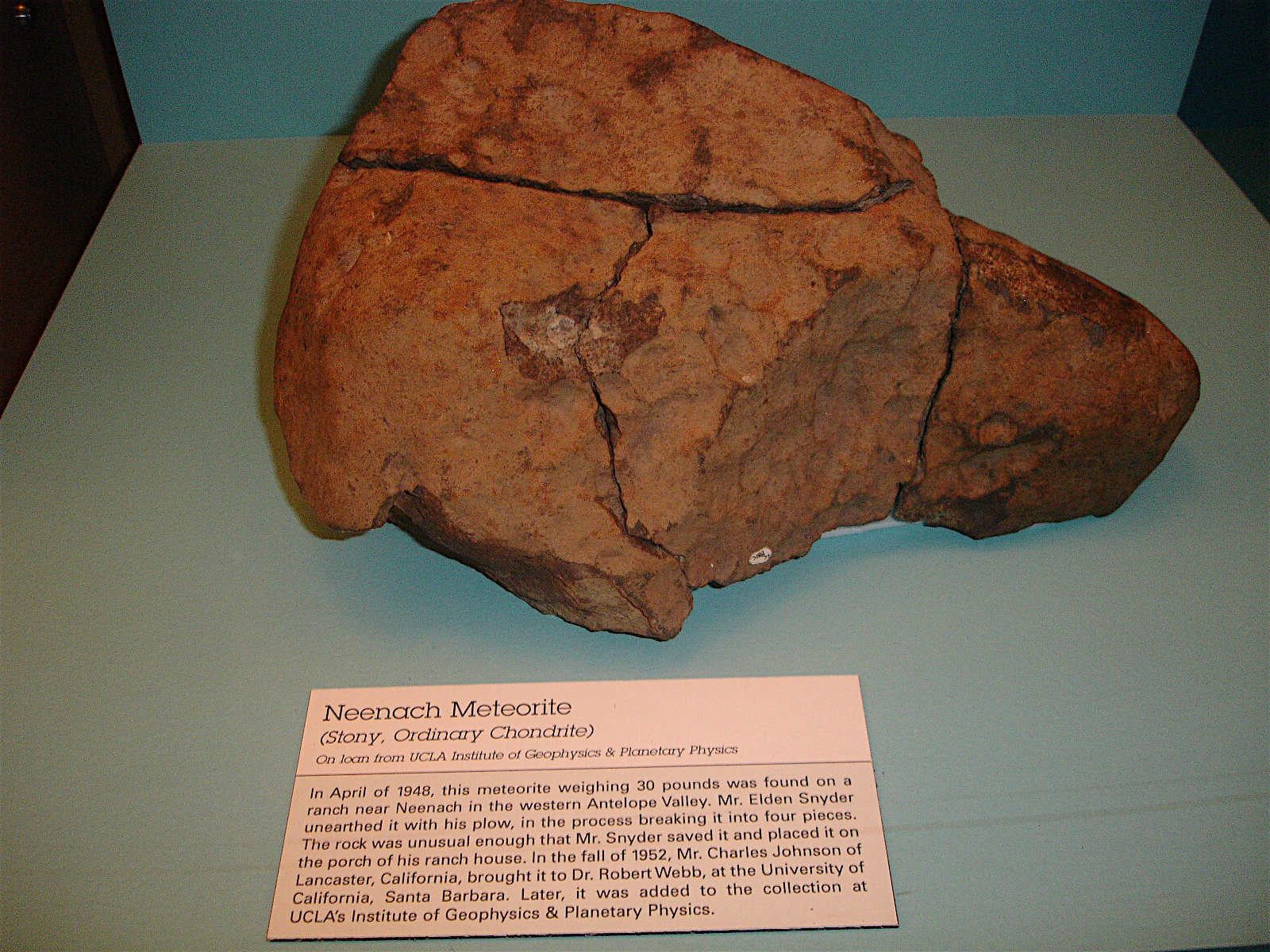
The Neenach Meteorite, discovered in 1948 and photographed in 2007

The Neenach Meteorite is a 30-pound mass of stony, ordinary chondrite discovered in April 1948 by Elden Snyder of Neenach when he unearthed it with his plow, in the process breaking it into four pieces. In 1952 it was brought to the attention of Robert Wallace Webb of the University of California, Santa Barbara. Later it was donated to the collection of the Institute of Geophysics and Planetary Physics at the University of California, Los Angeles.

== Communication ==
The ZIP Code is 93536, served by the Lancaster post office, and the telephone system is part of area code 661.

== Gallery ==
2008 images

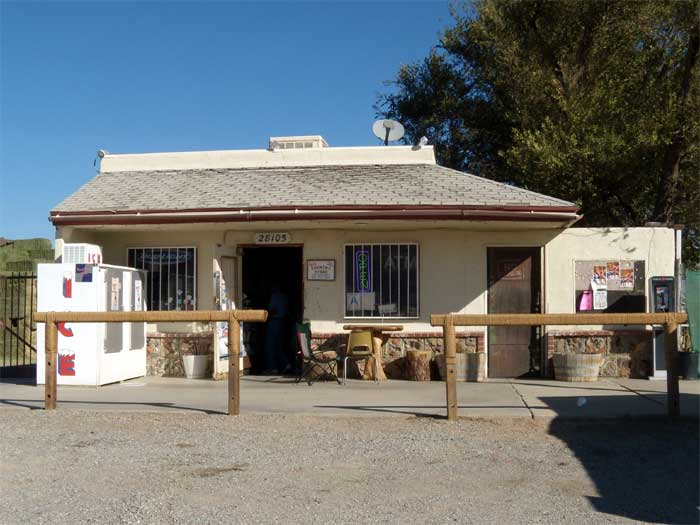
Gil's Country Store on Highway 138

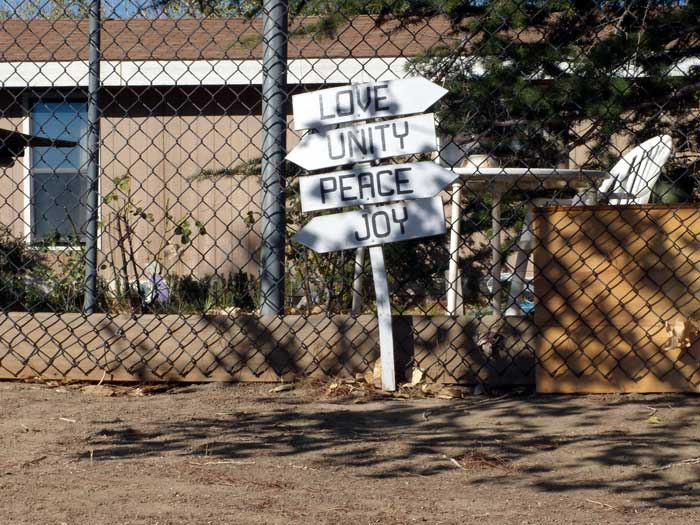
A homeowner's directional sign

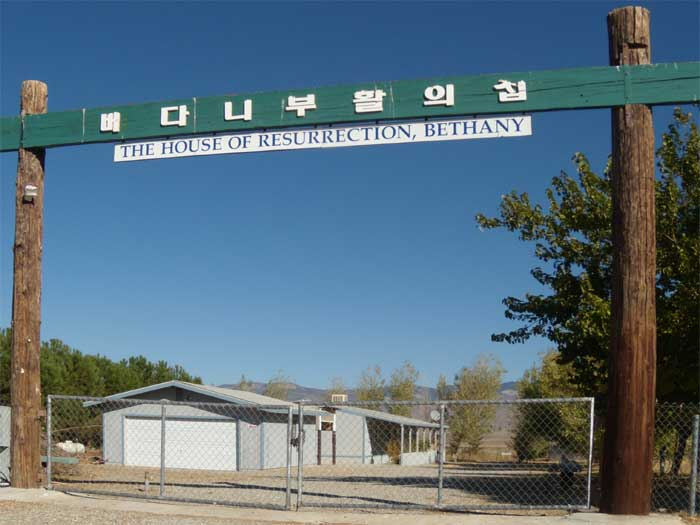
Korean-language church compound

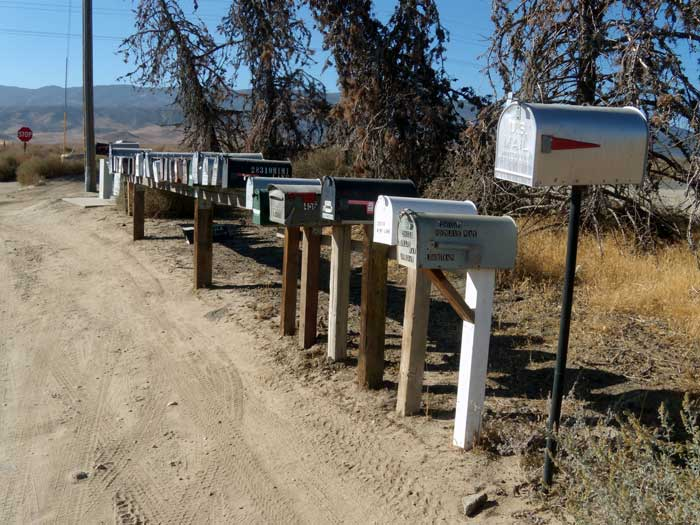
Mailboxes by the side of the road

== See also ==
- Mountain Communities of the Tejon Pass

== Additional reading ==
- "Distance From San Francisco to St. Louis: From Station to Station," The Semi-Weekly Southern News, February 6, 1861, page 4 Settlement of Cow Springs listed south of Tejon Canyon and north of Hart's Ranch in Santa Clarita
- "On His Own Domain," San Francisco Examiner, July 28, 1888, page 1 Posse on the trail of bandit chief Frank Fray stops to rest in Cow Springs, "on the eastern border of the Liebre ranch."
