= Stockton–Los Angeles Road =

The Stockton–Los Angeles Road, also known as the Millerton Road, Stockton–Mariposa Road, Stockton–Fort Miller Road, or the Stockton–Visalia Road, was established about 1853 following the discovery of gold on the Kern River in Old Tulare County. This route between Stockton and Los Angeles (except that between Stockton and Davis's Ferry on the Tuolumne River) is described in "Itinerary XXI. From Fort Yuma to Benicia, California", in The Prairie Traveler: A Hand-book for Overland Expeditions by Randolph Barnes Marcy. The Itinerary was derived from the report of Lieutenant R. S. Williamson on his 1853 topographical survey party in search of a railroad route through the interior of California.

== Southern route to the goldfields ==
Transportation and commerce to the northern part of California from Southern California prior to 1849 was carried north along the coast via El Camino Real or later diverted to the north, from the San Fernando Mission inland via El Camino Viejo, "the old road", a route over the mountains north of Los Angeles, along the west side of the San Joaquin Valley, turning west across the coast ranges to reach Oakland and San Francisco. During and after 1849, transportation and commerce to the gold mines of the Mother Lode from the south became a northern extension of the Southern Emigrant Trail up the east side of the San Joaquin Valley from the El Camino Viejo.

The "forty-niner" route from Los Angeles followed El Camino Viejo to San Fernando Mission then northward over the steep Fremont Pass, across the Santa Clarita Valley and up through the San Francisquito Canyon to San Francisquito Pass and north to Elizabeth Lake. From the lake the route was north through the foothills via Willow Springs Canyon, then northwest to Mud Spring, where the road divided. From Mud Spring, El Camino Viejo turned west northwest to Cow Springs and west to Portezuela de Castac or Castac Pass (now Tejon Pass). Beyond Castac Pass, El Camino Viejo turned west up what became Cuddy Canyon and Cuddy Valley where it turned down the Arroyo San Emigdio to Rancho San Emidio, one of the few settlements in the then trackless and unsettled southern San Joaquin Valley. Another route, not well known or used, diverted north from "the old road" at Castac Pass to follow La Cañada de las Uvas or Grapevine Canyon down into San Joaquin Valley.

The most direct wagon route was directly north from Mud Spring, across the Antelope Valley to Cottonwood Creek, following it up the east slope of the Tehachapi Mountains to cross them at the old Tejon Pass, then descending the west slope to the canyon of Tejon Creek, which the road followed down through Rancho El Tejon into the San Joaquin Valley. This road over the old Tejon Pass was later described as "one of the worst roads he ever saw" by Lieutenant R. S. Williamson who made the survey of the pass for a railroad route through the Tehachapi Mountains. He found a better route further west at La Cañada de las Uvas, the Grapevine Canyon route, where he sent his own wagons. His recommendation would popularize the Grapevine route for later teamsters and emigrants. The old Tejon Pass route was abandoned in favor of the route through Grapevine Canyon and Fort Tejon Pass, inheriting the name "Tejon Pass".

Once in the San Joaquin Valley the route proceeded north following the eastern foothills of the Sierras, crossing the various creeks and rivers near these eastern foothills of the Sierra's to avoid the marshes in the valley, until reaching the goldfields of the Mother Lode.

Also in 1853, Los Angeles businessman Henry Clay Wiley installed a windlass atop the Fremont Pass to speed and ease the ascent and descent of the steep Santa Clara Divide, and built a tavern, hotel and stable nearby. In 1854, Wiley sold out to Sanford and Cyrus Lyon and it began to be called Lyons' Station. At the same time, Phineas Banning obtained the business of supplying Fort Tejon. The Castac Pass now became known as the Fort Tejon Pass.

In the next few years, settlements and miners camps gradually spread along this route along the Sierra foothills looking for new gold mines. Cattle and horses from Southern California were driven north along the route and immigrants and teamsters continued to follow it. Ferries began to be established at the various crossing places.

== Kern River gold rush ==
In 1853, D. B. James and Brigham James made the first discovery of gold at the Kern River in the huge, but until then nearly unsettled, Mariposa County. With unclaimed placer gold sites becoming more scarce in the Mother Lode region to the north, a stampede to the Southern Mines followed. Traffic to the south boomed. To make it practical to get the business of supplying the Kern River gold miners from San Pedro, Phineas Banning made a few adjustments to the old road, carving a small cut through the Santa Clara Divide then running eastward before descending down Elsmere Canyon to Lyons' Station.

By 1855, Phineas Banning's wagon trains were carrying supplies from Los Angeles via Fort Tejon to Fort Miller (in what is now Fresno County) and for the Kern River gold rush. Several thousand miners participated in the Kern River Gold Rush but most were disappointed. Over the following seven or eight years other discoveries were made nearby at White River, Keyesville, Owens River, in the Slate Range and in the Coso District that caused other mining booms. These kept the Stockton–Los Angeles Road active, connected with two trails cut across the Sierra Nevada mountains over which pack trains carrying supplies were sent to these new mines. A wagon road was also constructed from Visalia through Keyesville and Walker Pass to Owens Valley. By 1858 there were three stamp mills in the Kern River district, several other stamp mills were constructed a few years later to mill the ore of the Coso and Owens River districts and the freighting of supplies to these places became a major business in Los Angeles and Stockton.

In 1858, the southern portion of the road from Los Angeles to Visalia was taken as part of the route of the Butterfield Overland Mail, being used until 1861 when the American Civil War put an end to its use. Commercial use by long haul freight wagons, stagecoaches, and livestock continued until the mid 1870s when the railroad from northern California reached Los Angeles.

== Route ==
The route began at Stockton, leaving the city toward the southeast toward the foothills of the Sierras to avoid the marshes called "tules" and the often-flooded lowlands or lakes along the course of the San Joaquin River and the lower reaches of its tributaries. Due to competing ferry crossings and bridges, or the condition of the roads, different roads roughly paralleling the route would be taken. One of these was the old French Camp Road, which was better drained than the Mariposa Road during the rainy season. The route from Stockton crossed San Joaquin County to Dry Creek (now Lone Tree Creek) about two miles north-northeast of modern Escalon then on to the crossings of the Stanislaus River either at Heath & Emory's Ferry up river from modern Oakdale or at Taylor's Ferry Crossing in Oakdale or further down river at Islips Ferry.

The route then continued southeast to the Tuolumne River crossings at either Dickinson's Ferry, the principal ferry on the route, near modern Waterford, California or at Davis's Ferry, 2 miles (3.2 km) down the river from Dickinson's Ferry.

From Dickinson's Ferry there is mileage data compiled by the Prairie Traveler Itinerary. The route reached the Merced River, upriver from Snelling, after 18.87 miles (30.37 km). The three main crossings of the Merced River were located within 2 miles (3.2 km) downstream from Merced Falls, a set of rapids on the Merced River 6 miles (9.7 km) east of Snelling. These ferries were Young's Ferry, Belt's Ferry, (later Murray's Ferry), and Phillips' Ferry. Phillips's Ferry was the place farthest east, upriver, where the Mariposa and Merced County boundary line crossed the Merced River; Murray's was only a short distance below Phillips's; but above Young's. Here the route had reached the edge of the eastern foothills and now it followed them southward, because such a route was nearer the mines and the river crossings were much easier than in the level plains below, that were more difficult to travel especially in wet weather and during the spring floods.

From Phillips' Ferry the route ran 18.33 miles (29.50 km) from the Merced River to Bear Creek. Then after 10.39 miles (16.72 km) it came to the crossing of the Mariposa River, were John and "Paddy" Bennett, kept the Union post office. Another 10.39 miles and the road came to Newton's Crossing on the Chowchilla River or "Big Mariposa" was reached. This section of road from Phillips Ferry to Newton's Crossing became the boundary line between Merced and Mariposa Counties when Merced County was created from Mariposa County in 1855.

From Newton's Crossing it was 12.15 miles (19.55 km) to Fresno Crossing on the Fresno River, about twelve miles east of what is now Madera, California. From "Fresno Crossing" the route continued 7.72 miles (12.42 km) to the crossing at Cottonwood Creek and beyond in another 9.4 miles (15.1 km) came to McCray's Ferry and Millerton on the south bank of the San Joaquin River with Fort Miller, midway on the route to Los Angeles.

From Fort Miller it was 25.73 miles (41.41 km) to the Slough of King's River and 12.3 miles (19.8 km) more to Campbells Crossing on the Upper Kings River, 3 miles (4.8 km) above modern Reedley, California. William Campbell and John Poole operated Poole's Ferry at Campbells Crossing from 1851 to 1857. Smith's Ferry was established by James Smith and his wife, at what is now Reedley in 1855. Smith's was the only ferry boat on the Kings River that could be approached at high water and outlasted other Kings River ferries, being operated by the Smith family until 1874. Smith kept a two-story, 11-room hotel nearby. In 1858, W. W. Hills established Hills Ferry upstream at Poole's Crossing on the King's River at what became Scotsburg.

From Campbells Crossing it was 28.13 miles (45.27 km) to the crossing at St. John's Creek, the first and northernmost of the creeks of the "Four Creeks" which was crossed by the wagon-road. These streams were commonly known as the "Four Creeks" but were distributaries of the Kaweah River that divided itself after emerging from the Sierra's forming a delta before entering Tulare Lake to the west. From St. John's Creek it was only 0.89 miles (1.43 km) to the Kaweah River, the second and principal one of the "Four Creeks." Between these two streams the town of Visalia grew up from its beginning in 1853, located west downstream from the original route of the road. From the Kaweah River River it was 3.3 miles (5.3 km) to Cameron Creek, the third of the "Four Creeks." From Cameron Creek it was only 0.29 miles (0.47 km) to Deep Creek, fourth and southernmost of the "Four Creeks".

From Deep Creek the road ran 22 miles (35 km) to the Tule River. From 1854 Peter Goodhue operated an emigrant trail stopping place on the bank of the Tule River until the river changed its course in 1862. It was also the site of the Tule River Stage Station for the Butterfield Overland Mail, from 1858 to 1861. R. Porter Putnam, who ran the place in 1860, later founded Porterville there in 1864.

From Tule River the route ran 5.10 miles (8.21 km) to More's Creek (now Deer Creek). The road then ran 11.1 miles (17.9 km) southeast to Stickneys Ferry on White Creek, (now White River). About 5 miles (8.0 km) southeast of More's Creek midway to White River, Fountain Springs was established before 1855, at the junction of the Stockton–Los Angeles Road and the road to the Kern River gold mines. From Stickneys Ferry it was 24.3 miles (39.1 km) to the Depot Camp and the road crossing of Poso Creek. From the Depot Camp it was 10.8 miles (17.4 km) to the Kern River crossing at Gordon's Ferry.

From Gordon's Ferry it was 31 miles (50 km) to the Depot Camp on Tejon Creek. From the Tejon Depot Camp it was 13.1 miles (21.1 km) up the Grapevine Canyon, to Fort Tejon and on to the summit of the Fort Tejon Pass. From the summit of Fort Tejon Pass it was 24 miles (39 km) to the summit of the road in the Coast Range in San Francisquito Pass. From the pass it was 15.8 miles (25.4 km) down San Francisquito Canyon to the southeast fork of the Santa Clara River and the Rancho San Francisco. From there it was another 7.15 miles (11.51 km) to the summit of the Lyons' Station and Fremont Pass.

From the top of Fremont Pass it was 5.9 miles (9.5 km) of a steep descent to the bottom of the pass, and on to Mission of San Fernando in the valley and another 10.7 miles (17.2 km) to the Rancho Cahuenga at the crossing of a branch of the Los Angeles River. From the Cahuenga crossing it was another 10.2 miles (16.4 km) through Cahuenga Pass to Los Angeles.

== Decline of the road ==
In the 1870s, the railroad constructed through the San Joaquin Valley and to Los Angeles drew population from the Sierra foothills into the towns along the rail line, and replaced long distance hauling of freight and passengers on the road. Diversion of water for irrigation dried up the lowlands of the San Joaquin Valley in the 1880s, making the road no longer the only one passable in bad weather, and it fell further into disuse.

== See also ==
- El Camino Real (California)
- El Camino Viejo
- Butterfield Overland Mail
