= Mud Spring (Antelope Valley) =

Human settlement in California, US

- Interactive map of Mud Spring
- Location: Antelope Valley, Mojave Desert, Los Angeles County, California, United States
- Coordinates: 34°42′36″N 118°25′04″W
- Elevation: 2,871 feet (875 m) above sea level

Mud Spring, formerly called Aquaje Lodoso (muddy watering place), is a spring and historic site in the western Antelope Valley, within northern Los Angeles County, southern California.

It is located the western Mojave Desert at an elevation of 2,871 feet (875 m), north of Lake Hughes and east of the Tehachapi Mountains.

== History ==
=== El Camino Viejo ===
Aquaje Lodoso was an aguaje, a watering place on the Spanish and Mexican El Camino Viejo inland north–south route in colonial Alta California. It was located between Elizabeth Lake and Cow Spring water sources.

It was also a watering place on the Old Tejon Pass road between the Antelope and San Joaquin Valleys in the 1840s and early 1850s until that road was replaced by the Stockton–Los Angeles Road, a new and easier road through Fort Tejon Pass.

=== Stockton - Los Angeles Road ===
The Butterfield Overland Mail 1st Division had a station operating at Mud Springs, on the Stockton - Los Angeles Road. In 1860, a correspondent of the Daily Alta California wrote an account of his travel by stagecoach to Los Angeles from San Francisco. He mentions that the Butterfield Overland Mail (1857-1861) had a station operating at Mud Springs in 1860.

It was 14 miles (23 km) east from French John's Station, and 13 miles (21 km) north from Clayton's—Widow Smith's Station near San Francisquito Pass in the Sierra Pelona Mountains.

Another account of the Butterfield Stage reports, "Mud Springs, a camping place and the site of a stage station from 1861 to 1871, operated by a Mr. Clancy, was located just east of where the Santa Fé railroad crosses Ciénega Avenue, southeast of San Dimas. From Mud Springs to Los Angeles the stages and freight teams usually went by way of El Monte."

== See also ==
- Butterfield Overland Mail in California
