= Posey Creek Station =

Overland Mail stagecoach stop in California

- Location within California
- 35.522778°N 118.963056°W
- Location: Bakersfield-Glennville Rd. and Round Mountain Rd., Kern County, California

California Historical Landmark
- Reference no.: 539

Posey Creek Station of the Butterfield Overland Mail 1st Division was located on Posey or Poso Creek, in the southeastern San Joaquin Valley, in present-day Kern County, California.

== History ==
The station was at the site of the earlier Depot Camp on Posey Creek, established by the 1853 Pacific Railroad Survey Expedition of the U. S. Army led by Lieutenant Robert Stockton Williamson. It was a stopping place on the Stockton - Los Angeles Road.

The Butterfield Overland Mail (1857–1861) stagecoach station was located here in 1858, 15 miles (24 km) southwest of Mountain House station and 10 miles (16 km) north of Gordon's Ferry (Kern River Station) on the Kern River.

== Landmark ==
The site is 2.5 miles (4.0 km) east of the intersection of Glennville-Bakersfield/Granite Road and Round Mountain Road. The California Historical Landmark Marker Number 539 at the intersection is seen on the left when traveling south on Glennville-Bakersfield/Granite Road.

California Historical Landmark Marker reads:

NO. 539 POSEY STATION OF BUTTERFIELD OVERLAND MAIL LINES - Two and one-half miles east of this point stood the Posey Station on the Butterfield Overland Stage route that ran from St. Louis, Missouri through present-day Kern County to San Francisco during 1858-61, until the outbreak of the Civil War.

== See also ==
- Butterfield Overland Mail in California
- California Historical Landmarks in Kern County
- California Historical Landmark
