= East Oakdale, California =

East Oakdale
- Unincorporated Community; Census Designated Place
- Location in Stanislaus County and the state of California
- Coordinates: 37°47′37″N 120°48′24″W
- Country: United States
- State: California
- County: Stanislaus

Area
  - Total: 5.54 sq mi (14.35 km^{2})
  - Land: 5.39 sq mi (13.97 km^{2})
  - Water: 0.15 sq mi (0.39 km^{2}) 2.69%
- Elevation: 144 ft (44 m)

Population (2020)
  - Total: 3,201
  - Density: 593.6/sq mi (229.18/km^{2})
- Time zone: UTC-8 (Pacific (PST))
  - Summer (DST): UTC-7 (PDT)
- ZIP code: 95361
- Area code: 209
- FIPS code: 06-20907
- GNIS feature ID: 1853386

East Oakdale is an unincorporated census-designated place (CDP) on the Stanislaus River, located east of the city of Oakdale, California.

It is part of the Modesto Metropolitan Statistical Area in the San Joaquin Valley. The population was 3,201 at the 2020 census.

== Geography ==
East Oakdale is located at 37°47′37″N 120°48′24″W (37.793528, -120.806669).

According to the United States Census Bureau, the CDP has a total area of 5.2 square miles (13 km^{2}), of which 4.7 square miles (12 km^{2}) is land and 0.4 square miles (1.0 km^{2}) (2.69%) is water.

== History ==
Three ferries were crossing the Stanislaus River on the 19th−century Stockton - Los Angeles Road. The site of the easternmost crossing, Heath & Emory's Ferry, is in present-day East Oakdale. The second, Taylor's Ferry Crossing, was located in the present day city of Oakdale. The third, Islips Ferry, was further down river in present-day Langworth.

== Demographics ==
Historical population
Census	Pop.	Note	%±
2000	2,742		—
2010	2,762		0.7%
2020	3,201		15.9%
U.S. Decennial Census; 1860–1870 1880-1890; 1900 1910 1920; 1930 1940 1950; 1960 1970 1980; 1990 2000 2010

East Oakdale first appeared as a census designated place in the 2000 U.S. census.

=== 2020 census ===
As of the 2020 census, East Oakdale had a population of 3,201. The population density was 593.5 inhabitants per square mile (229.2/km^{2}). The median age was 51.0 years. The age distribution was 19.2% under the age of 18, 6.0% aged 18 to 24, 17.0% aged 25 to 44, 29.9% aged 45 to 64, and 27.9% who were 65 years of age or older. For every 100 females, there were 99.8 males, and for every 100 females age 18 and over, there were 99.0 males age 18 and over.

61.5% of residents lived in urban areas, while 38.5% lived in rural areas.

The Census reported that 3,201 people (100% of the population) lived in households. There were 1,214 households, out of which 24.4% included children under the age of 18. Of all households, 70.0% were married-couple households, 3.5% were cohabiting couple households, 15.8% had a female householder with no spouse or partner present, and 10.6% had a male householder with no spouse or partner present. 17.4% of households were one person, and 11.3% were one person aged 65 or older. The average household size was 2.64. There were 966 families (79.6% of all households).

There were 1,278 housing units at an average density of 237.0 units per square mile (91.5 units/km^{2}), of which 1,214 (95.0%) were occupied and 64 (5.0%) were vacant. Of occupied units, 89.9% were owner-occupied and 10.1% were occupied by renters. The homeowner vacancy rate was 0.3% and the rental vacancy rate was 4.7%.

Racial composition as of the 2020 census
Race	Number	Percent
White	2,458	76.8%
Black or African American	17	0.5%
American Indian and Alaska Native	30	0.9%
Asian	117	3.7%
Native Hawaiian and Other Pacific Islander	4	0.1%
Some other race	189	5.9%
Two or more races	386	12.1%
Hispanic or Latino (of any race)	452	14.1%

=== Income and poverty ===
In 2023, the US Census Bureau estimated that the median household income was $122,647, and the per capita income was $71,324. About 5.7% of families and 9.5% of the population were below the poverty line.

=== 2010 census ===
The 2010 United States census reported that East Oakdale had a population of 2,762. The population density was 529.8 inhabitants per square mile (204.6/km^{2}). The racial makeup of East Oakdale was 2,530 (91.6%) White, 7 (0.3%) African American, 18 (0.7%) Native American, 60 (2.2%) Asian, 5 (0.2%) Pacific Islander, 78 (2.8%) from other races, and 64 (2.3%) from two or more races. Hispanic or Latino of any race were 284 persons (10.3%).

The Census reported that 2,762 people (100% of the population) lived in households, 0 (0%) lived in non-institutionalized group quarters, and 0 (0%) were institutionalized.

There were 1,055 households, out of which 301 (28.5%) had children under the age of 18 living in them, 809 (76.7%) were opposite-sex married couples living together, 40 (3.8%) had a female householder with no husband present, 27 (2.6%) had a male householder with no wife present. There were 31 (2.9%) unmarried opposite-sex partnerships, and 3 (0.3%) same-sex married couples or partnerships. 138 households (13.1%) were made up of individuals, and 78 (7.4%) had someone living alone who was 65 years of age or older. The average household size was 2.62. There were 876 families (83.0% of all households); the average family size was 2.87.

The population was spread out, with 562 people (20.3%) under the age of 18, 159 people (5.8%) aged 18 to 24, 413 people (15.0%) aged 25 to 44, 1,046 people (37.9%) aged 45 to 64, and 582 people (21.1%) who were 65 years of age or older. The median age was 50.0 years. For every 100 females, there were 94.5 males. For every 100 females age 18 and over, there were 97.0 males.

There were 1,102 housing units at an average density of 211.4 per square mile (81.6/km^{2}), of which 984 (93.3%) were owner-occupied, and 71 (6.7%) were occupied by renters. The homeowner vacancy rate was 1.8%; the rental vacancy rate was 5.3%. 2,553 people (92.4% of the population) lived in owner-occupied housing units and 209 people (7.6%) lived in rental housing units.

== Government ==
In the California State Legislature, East Oakdale is in the 4th senatorial district, represented by Republican Marie Alvarado-Gil, and the 9th Assembly district, represented by Republican Heath Flora.

In the United States House of Representatives, East Oakdale is in California's 5th congressional district, represented by Republican Tom McClintock.
