= Tejon Creek =

- Etymology: Spanish
- Native name: Arroyo de Tejon (Spanish)

Location
- Country: United States
- State: California
- Region: Tehachapi Mountains
- District: Kern County

Physical characteristics
- Source: source
  - location: on the west slope of the Tehachapi Mountains., Kern County
  - coordinates: 35°00′55″N 118°28′48″W
- Mouth: mouth
  - location: Kern County
  - coordinates: 35°08′09″N 118°53′45″W
  - elevation: 410 ft (120 m)

California Historical Landmark
- Reference no.: 540

Tejon Creek, originally in Spanish Arroyo de Tejon, is a stream in Kern County, California. Its headwaters are located on the western slopes of the Tehachapi Mountains, and it flows northwest into the southern San Joaquin Valley.

== History ==
Arroyo de Tejón (Tejon Creek), the canyon and stream, along with the pass through it and over the Tehachapi Mountains, were named with Tejón (Spanish: badger) after a dead badger was found at the canyon's mouth by Lt. Francisco Ruiz in 1806. The Spanish military expedition led by Ruiz was exploring inland routes to the San Joaquin Valley and 'upper' settled Alta California, via the deserts from colonial New Spain (present day Mexico).

Along the creek and south of it the land grant Rancho Tejón was established in 1843.

Lieutenant Robert Stockton Williamson of the Pacific Railroad Survey Expedition surveyed the area in 1853, setting up his Depot Camp along the creek, on the land of the Rancho Tejón.

The Sebastian Indian Reservation (Tejon Indian Reservation), the first Indian reservation in California, was established along Tejon Creek in 1853. It existed for 9 years, until the treaty was revoked by the U.S. government in 1864.

=== The Tejon Passes ===
==== Old Tejon Pass ====
The ancient native trail now known as Old Tejon Pass was "discovered" in 1772 by Spanish explorer Pedro Fages, and used in 1776 by padre Francisco Garces, traveling east of the Anza Colonizing Expedition's main route. It is 15 miles (24 km) to the northeast of the present day Tejon Pass, in the Tehachapi Mountains, at the top of the divide between Tejon Creek Canyon in the San Joaquin Valley and Cottonwood Creek Canyon in the Antelope Valley of the western Mojave Desert.

In 1806, Lt. Francisco Ruiz named it Tejón Pass while on an expedition into the San Joaquin Valley. Ruiz also named Tejon Canyon and Tejon Creek, all after the dead badger (tejón) he had found at the canyon mouth.

Later the El Camino Viejo, a Spanish and Mexican inland route from the Pueblo de Los Angeles northward, crossed the western Antelope Valley from Elizabeth Lake to Cottonwood Creek, and then crossed the Tehachapi Mountains at Old Tejon Pass, following Tejon Creek down into the San Joaquin Valley.

Gold Rush 49ers, and early emigrants and teamsters followed this route. The Five Joaquins Gang used the route over the pass to drive their droves of stolen and wild horses southward to Sonora.

It was described in 1853, by an Army Topographic Engineer, Lieutenant Robert Stockton Williamson as "one of the worst roads he ever saw." In an oak grove along the middle reach of the creek, on Rancho El Tejon, was the site of the Depot Camp of Williamson's Pacific Railroad expedition while it surveyed the passes into the San Joaquin Valley as possible routes for the railroad.

==== Fort Tejon Pass — Tejon Pass ====
Williamson much preferred as a wagon route the lower and easier Grapevine Canyon to the west that led to a pass between the Tehachapi and San Emigdio Mountains. Following this discovery and the construction of Fort Tejon, wagon traffic soon changed to the easier Grapevine route named Fort Tejon Pass. The new Stockton - Los Angeles Road used it, and the Old Tejon Pass route was gradually abandoned.

The name Tejon Pass was transferred west following the closure of Fort Tejon, when "Fort" was dropped from the Fort Tejon Pass name. The (Old) Tejon Pass eventually was so unused that it lost its name altogether on maps.

=== Sinks of Tejon Station ===
In 1858, the Butterfield Overland Mail 1st Division established the Sinks of Tejon Station at the mouth of Tejon Creek, west of Comanche Point. There at the Sinks of Tejon, the creek's waters sank into the ground of the San Joaquin Valley here during the dry season, instead of reaching Kern Lake.

The Butterfield Overland Mail (1857–1861) stagecoaches' next stations were: Kern River Slough Station located 14 miles (23 km) to the northeast; and Fort Tejon Station located 15 miles (24 km) to the southwest.

The Sinks of Tejon Station site is a registered California Historical Landmark, #540.

The California Historical Landmark reads:

NO. 540 SINKS OF THE TEJÓN, ALSO KNOWN AS ALAMO, STATION OF BUTTERFIELD OVERLAND MAIL LINES - Six miles east of this point was the site of the Butterfield Stage Line station Sinks of Tejón. Operating through present Kern County during 1858-61, this famous line ran from St. Louis, Missouri to San Francisco until the outbreak of the Civil War.

== See also ==
- Butterfield Overland Mail in California
- Index of Tehachapi Mountains articles
- California Historical Landmarks in Kern County
- California Historical Landmark
