= Elizabeth Lake (Los Angeles County, California) =

Intermittent lake in Elizabeth Lake, California

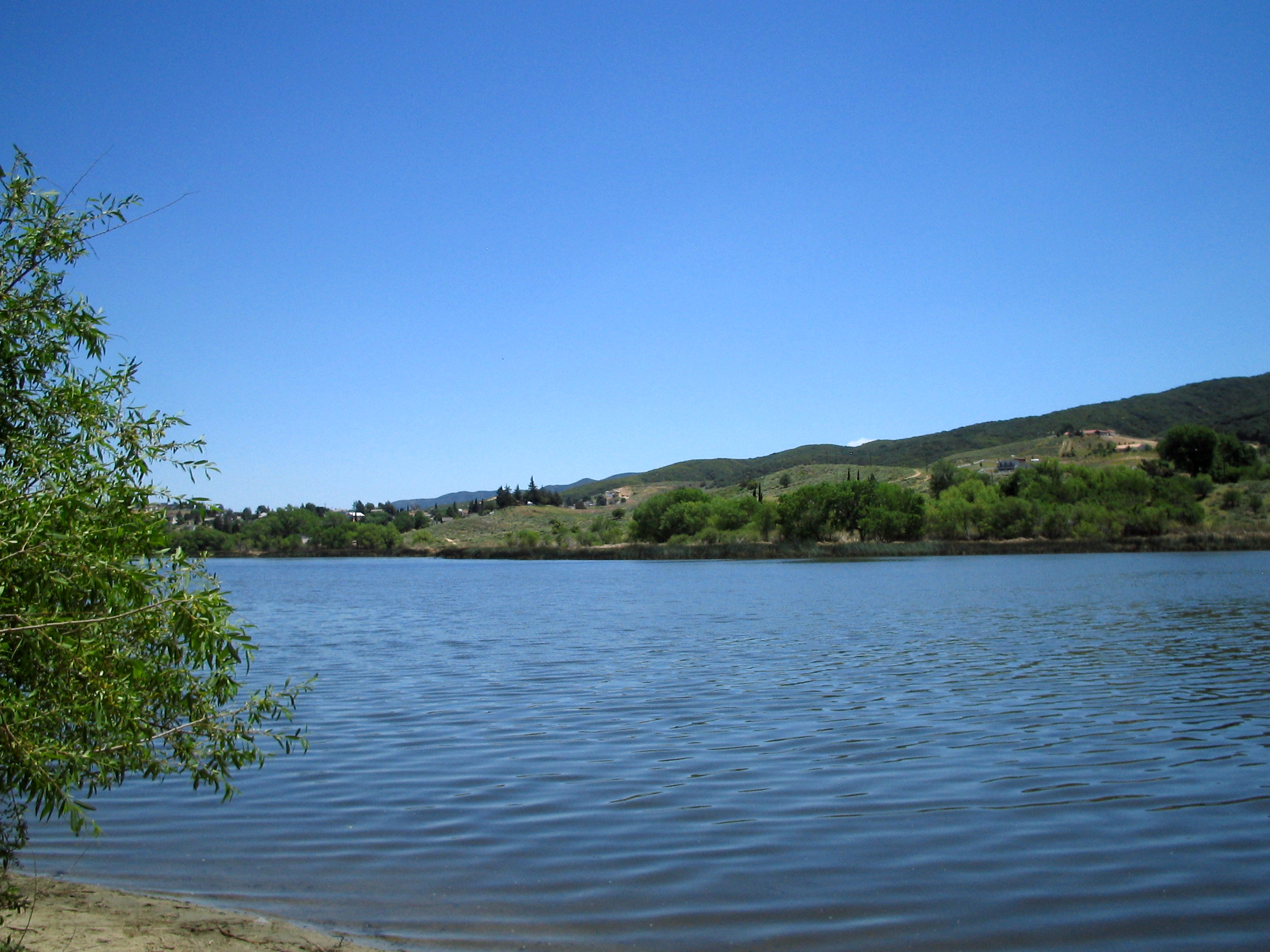
- In 2008

- Location within the Los Angeles metropolitan area Location within California Location within the United States
- Location: Sierra Pelona Mountains, Angeles National Forest, Los Angeles County, California
- Coordinates: 34.6658189°N 118.4025808°W
- Type: Sag pond
- Basin countries: United States
- Surface elevation: 3,228 ft (984 m)
- Settlements: Elizabeth Lake, Lake Hughes

Elizabeth Lake is a natural sag pond that lies directly on the San Andreas Fault in the northern Sierra Pelona Mountains, in northwestern Los Angeles County, southern California.

== Geography ==
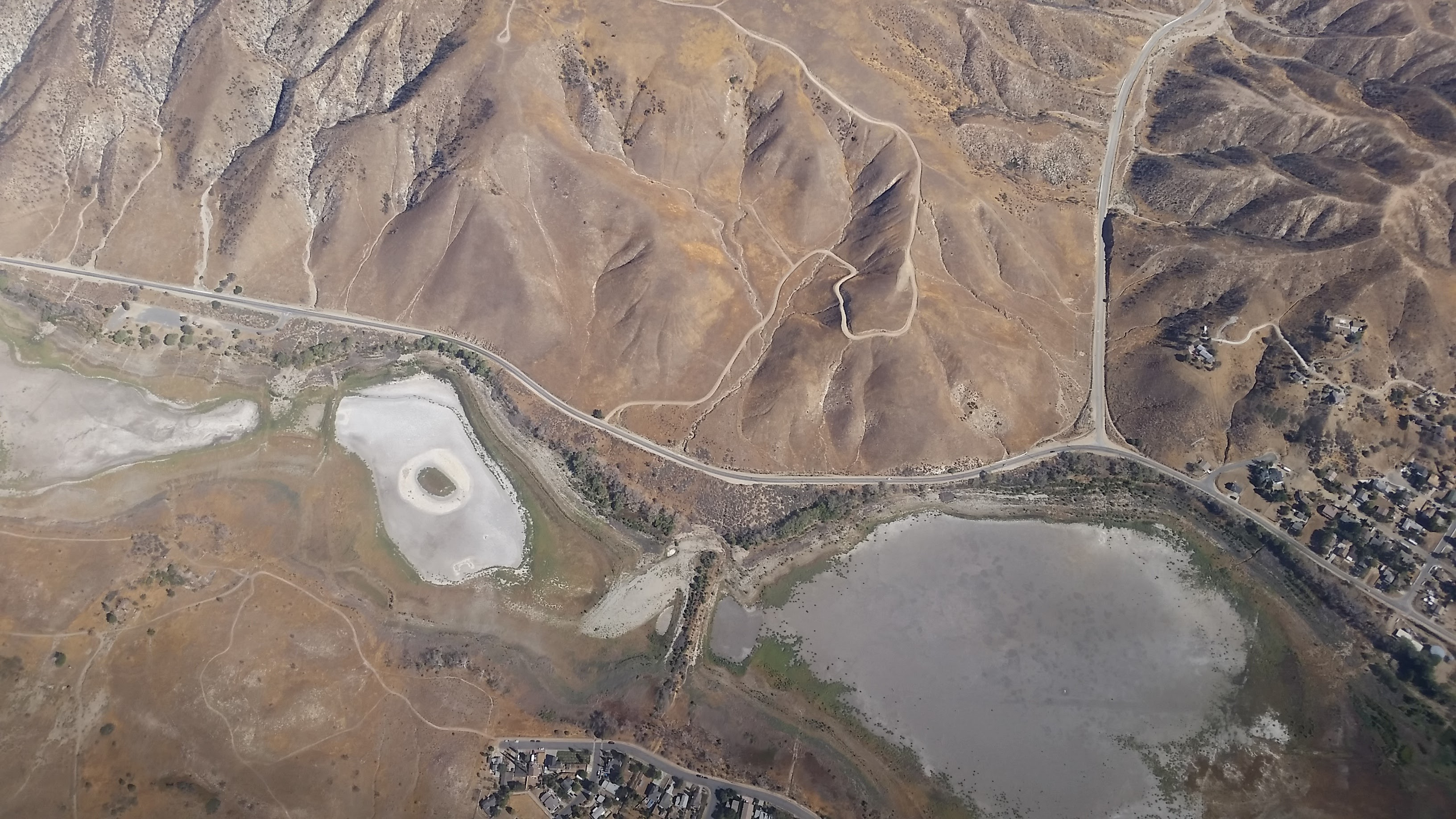
The dry lakebed of Lake Elizabeth in 2016

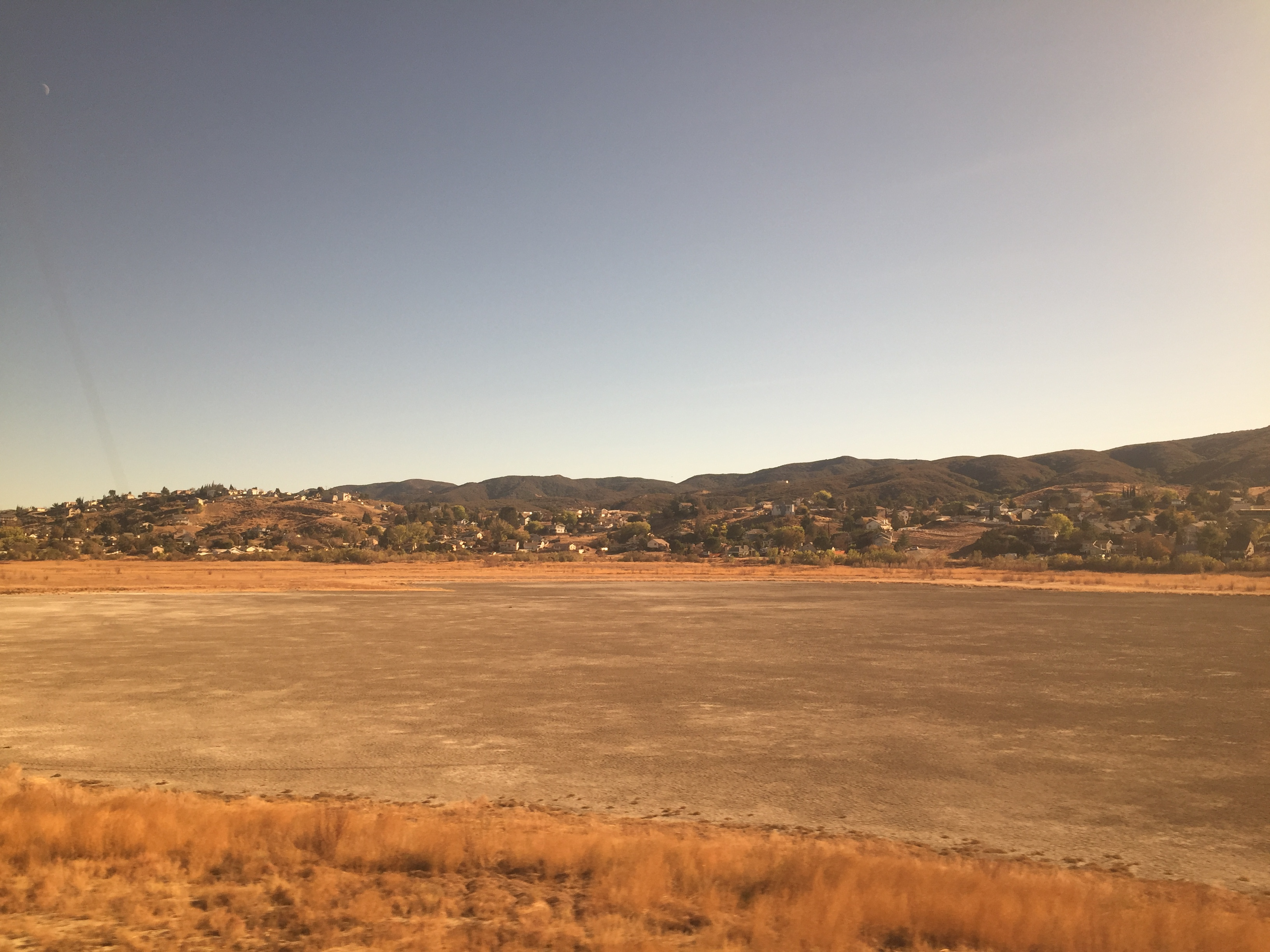
The dry lakebed of Lake Elizabeth in 2018

The lake, at 3,228 ft (984 m) in elevation, is within the Angeles National Forest. It is a natural perennial lake, but may dry up entirely during drought years. It is south of the western Antelope Valley.

Elizabeth Lake is one of a series of sag ponds created by the motion of the Earth's tectonic plates along the San Andreas Fault in the area, with others including Hughes Lake and the Munz Lakes. They are part of the northern upper Santa Clara River watershed.

The community of Elizabeth Lake is on the shore of the lake. It is administratively within the unincorporated community of Lake Hughes, and shares the same zip code.

== History ==
=== Name ===
In 1780, the Spanish explorer-priest Junípero Serra named the lake La Laguna de Diablo (English: Devil's Lake), because some who lived nearby believed that within it dwelt a pet of the devil, which later came to be known as the Elizabeth Lake Monster. The creature is said to resemble a dragon, with leathery wings and scaly skin.

Sometime after 1834, the lake was called La Laguna de Liebre (English: Jackrabbit Lake) for a short time. Then in the 1840s it became known as La Laguna de Chico Lopez, for Francisco "Chico" Lopez, who grazed cattle on its banks.

=== Native American ===
Elizabeth Lake once marked a dividing point between the territories of the Tataviam, Kitanemuk, and Serrano tribes of Native Americans. The Tataviam may have called it Kivarum. The Vanyume, or desert Serrano, village of Tsivung was located near the lake.

=== Spain and Mexico ===
As early as the 1780s, the main inland route between southern and northern Spanish colonial Las Californias province was El Camino Viejo a Los Ángeles (English: the Old Road to Los Angeles). It became a well established inland route, and an alternative to the coastal El Camino Real trail used since the 1770s. Locally, it ascended the Sierra Pelona Mountains via San Francisquito Canyon, crossed through San Francisquito Pass, ran north to the lake, and then skirted it and continued northwest to Aguaje Lodoso (Mud Spring) in the Antelope Valley and westward to Cow Springs and the Cuddy Valley, and then down Cuddy Canyon to the San Joaquin Valley.

Another inland route diverged from the El Camino Viejo at Elizabeth Lake, going north to cross the western Antelope Valley and then up Cottonwood Creek canyon, to cross over the Tehachapi Mountains via Old Tejon Pass, and down Tejon Creek canyon to the San Joaquin Valley. After 1843, much of that section was within the Mexican Alta California land grant of Rancho Tejon. From 1849 to before 1854, it was the main road connecting the southern part of the state to the trail along the eastern side of the San Joaquin Valley to the goldfields to the north.

The Mexican land grant Rancho La Liebre was established in 1846 in Alta California, with its southeastern section in the Sierra Pelona Mountains near the lake.

=== United States ===
In the early 1850s, the vicinity of La Laguna de Chico Lopez was a frequent haunt of California grizzly bears — so numerous that cattle ranching was considered impossible.

In 1854, the route to the San Joaquin Valley shifted away from the Old Tejon Pass route to the Stockton - Los Angeles Road, using the Fort Tejon Pass, and the Grapevine Canyon. The later Butterfield Overland Mail shortened the route to Cow Springs avoiding Mud Springs, skirting Elizabeth Lake to its north westward via the San Andreas Rift to Oakgrove Canyon then north via Pine Canyon to Antelope Valley and westward again to Cow Springs. The first building at the lake was La Casa de Miguel Ortiz, an adobe built by Miguel Ortiz, a muleteer, on land given him by his employer, wealthy landowner Edward Fitzgerald Beale. Southwest of the Ortiz Adobe was the Andrada Stage Station adobe, sited where the old Fort Tejon Road entered San Francisquito Canyon.

Circa 1915, there were hot springs in Elizabeth Lake Canyon. A U.S. government geologist reported, "They are not of high temperature nor notable flow, however, and are seldom visited. The San Andreas fault line is mapped as passing about 8 miles north of these springs, and its proximity suggests that the existence of the warm water may be due to subsidiary fracturing of the rocks."

The Crown Fire scorched 13,918 acres (5,632 ha) in the area and destroyed 10 residences in 2010. The lake was dry between 2013 and 2023 because of a drought.

==== Education ====
In 1869, the Los Angeles County Board of Supervisors designated the Elizabeth Lake School District to serve the area, which had the only established school between Los Angeles and Bakersfield. Land for the school was donated by Samuel and Almeda Frakes from their ranch lands. Children from the Lake Hughes, Elizabeth Lake, and Green Valley areas are still served by this school district. The 1869 wooden schoolhouse lasted until it was replaced by an adobe structure in the early 1930s, located on the east side of Elizabeth Lake Road, ¼ mile north of Andrada Corner at the intersection of San Francisquito and Elizabeth Lake Roads.

== See also ==
- Elizabeth Lake, California — community on lake
- List of lakes in California
- Category:Sierra Pelona Ridge – related topics
