= Tsivung =

Tsivung (Hispanicized: Chibuna) was a Vanyume or Serrano village located in what is now known as Antelope Valley near Elizabeth Lake, California.

== History ==
With the arrival of the Spanish colonizers and the establishment of San Fernando Mission in 1797, villagers from Tsivung came under the influence of the missions, similar to most of the surrounding villages in the area. Villagers were converted to Christianity at Mission San Fernando. 33 entries were recorded of villagers being baptized between the years of 1802 to 1812.

At the time of contact with the Spanish, a man by the name of Yataguopia (the Spanish referred to him as Apolonio) was the captain of the village. He was born in 1776, baptized in 1811, and survived through the mission period, which ended in about 1845.

== See also ==
- Wáꞌpeat
