= White River (California) =

- Location of mouth

Location
- Country: United States
- State: California
- Region: Central Valley
- Cities: White River, Ducor, Delano

Physical characteristics
- Source: Bull Run Peak
  - location: Tulare County
  - coordinates: 35.838006°N 118.5839766°W
  - elevation: 6,800 ft (2,100 m)
- Mouth: Tulare Lakebed
  - location: near Delano, Tulare County
  - coordinates: 35°51′06″N 119°17′16″W
  - elevation: 272 ft (83 m)
- Length: 50.7 mi (81.6 km)
- Basin size: 176 sq mi (460 km^{2})
- Discharge
  - location: Ducor, CA
  - average: 10 cu ft/s (0.28 m^{3}/s)
  - minimum: 0 cu ft/s (0 m^{3}/s)
  - maximum: 2,760 cu ft/s (78 m^{3}/s)

Basin features
- River system: Tulare Basin
- Tributaries
  - left: Arrastre Creek, Coarse Gold Creek
  - right: Capinero Creek, Cove Creek, Chalaney Creek, Coho Creek

The White River is a small river in the southern San Joaquin Valley of the U.S. state of California. The river is 50.7 miles (81.6 km) long and flows entirely within Tulare County. It rises at roughly 6,800 feet (2,100 m) above sea level in the foothills of the Sierra Nevada on the northwest slope of Bull Run Peak. It flows west, receiving several seasonal tributaries including Arrastre Creek, Coarse Gold Creek and Coho Creek, passing the small settlement of White River. As it nears the border of Tulare County and Kern County its surface flow disappears. The dry riverbed continues northwest into the agricultural San Joaquin Valley and is diverted into canals for flood control and irrigation purposes. The river terminates about 5 miles (8.0 km) north of Delano, short of the historic Tulare Lake.

== Hydrology ==
The White River is part of the Tulare Lake Basin, which is a closed drainage area in the southern San Joaquin Valley. Before farming and water projects changed the region, runoff from the Sierra Nevada foothills, including the White River, helped fill the wetlands and floodplains that surrounded Tulare Lake. These areas used to have large tule marshes and riparian zones that supported many plants and animals.

The river drains about 91 square miles and has a mean annual runoff of 6,862 acre-feet, which makes it one of the smaller waterways in the basin. Its flow is mostly seasonal, happening during the winter and spring from rain and snowmelt in the nearby Sierra Nevada. In really wet years, the White River could reach all the way to the Tulare Lakebed, but most of the time it ends on the valley floor before connecting to another river.

Today, much of the river's flow is used for agriculture and groundwater recharge, so the lower parts are usually dry except after big storms. The surrounding area includes foothill rangelands and farmland, which affect how much water and sediment move through the river during the year.

== Ecology ==
The White River is part of the Tulare Lake Basin, where streams and creeks tend to have similar ecological patterns because of the area's dry climate and seasonal water flow. The river supports fish communities that are common in low-elevation Sierra Nevada waterways, made up of both native and introduced warm-water species. During wetter years, fish can move farther downstream through connected canals and channels that once led to the Tulare Lakebed, but in drier years many parts of the river are dry for long periods.

== Indigenous History ==
The area surrounding the White River lies within the traditional homelands of the Yokuts people, including the Yauelmani and other nearby groups. The neighboring Tule River Indian Tribe of California, whose members descend from the Yokuts, Tubatulabal, and Paiute peoples of the southern San Joaquin Valley and Sierra Nevada, continues to maintain cultural and environmental ties to this region. The Tribe manages land in the Sierra foothills near the Tule and White River watersheds and has ongoing restoration projects to protect native habitats and species.
