= Fountain Springs, California =

Fountain Springs
- Former settlement
- Interactive map of Fountain Springs
- Coordinates: 35.891111°N 118.915556°W
- Country: United States
- State: California
- County: Tulare

California Historical Landmark
- Reference no.: 648

Fountain Springs was a settlement established in Tulare County, California, United States before 1855, at the junction of the Stockton–Los Angeles Road and the road to the Kern River gold mines. From 1858 to 1861, Fountain Springs was a station on the Butterfield Overland Mail route, 14 miles (23 km) southeast of Tule River Station and 12 miles (19 km) north of Mountain House. The site of the settlement was 1 1/2 miles (2.4 km) northwest of the California Historical Landmark No. 648 on the southwest corner of County Roads J22 and M 109 (old Springville Stage Route) in Tulare County.

Fountain Spring (singular) refers to a spring in Tulare County used in the 19th century for domestic and garden water supply.

== See also ==
- List of ghost towns in California
