= Old Tejon Pass =

Mountain pass in the Tehachapi Mountains

- Location within California
- Elevation: 5,285 feet (1,611 m)
- Traversed by: unpaved road

Third Approach
- Location: Kern County, California
- Range: Tehachapi Mountains
- Coordinates: 34°59′21″N 118°32′43″W

The Old Tejon Pass (originally Tejon Pass) is a mountain pass in the Tehachapi Mountains linking Southern and Central California.

== Geography ==
The pass is located in Kern County, California, 15 miles (24 km) to the northeast of the current Tejon Pass. It runs at the top of a divide between a point about 5 miles (8.0 km) east of the Rancho Tejon boundary in Tejon Creek Canyon, and Cottonwood Creek Canyon north of the Antelope Valley. It lies at an elevation of 5,285 feet (1,611 m), and sits between two peaks of 5,491 feet (1,674 m) (to the west) and 5,566 feet (1,697 m) (to the east).

== History ==
=== Old trails ===
The ancient native trail which utilized what is now known as the Old Tejon Pass was found and explored in 1772 by Spanish explorer Pedro Fages. The pass was used in 1776 by missionary explorer, padre Francisco Garcés. In 1806, Lt. Francisco Ruiz named it Tejon Pass while on an expedition into the San Joaquin Valley. Ruiz also named Tejon Canyon and Tejon Creek, all referencing the dead badger (or tejón) he had found at the canyon mouth.

In early 1827, the first overland American exploratory journey to California, led by Jedediah Smith, used the pass to move northwest from Antelope Valley into San Joaquin Valley, led by Native American guides familiar with the pass.

Rancho El Tejón, a large 1843 Mexican land grant in the Tehachapi Mountains, was headquartered below the pass along Tejon Creek. Eventually, a road running straight north (from Elizabeth Lake), across westernmost Antelope Valley, and then over this Tejon Pass evolved. This route to the pass diverted from the El Camino Viejo at Elisabeth Lake, and from 1849 to before 1854 it was the main road connecting the southern part of the state to the trail along the eastern side of the San Joaquin Valley to the goldfields to the north.

=== New route established ===
In 1853, the road which used the Old Tejon Pass was surveyed by Robert Stockton Williamson of the U.S. Army for suitability as a rail-bed for the planned transcontinental railroad into California. It was found wanting. The commander of the expedition particularly found the wagon road over the pass to be "one of the worst" he had ever seen. He much preferred the Grapevine Canyon route, a much better road further west. Williamson scouted it and found it would be far more suitable for rail lines and wagons if the bulk of the traffic henceforth went that way. The name "Tejon" was transferred west to the "Fort Tejon Pass," an integral part of the Stockton – Los Angeles Road, which was established through Grapevine Canyon. From then on, the old pass was used less and less; and eventually lost its designation on official maps. Afterward, Fort Tejon was abandoned, and the "Fort" was eventually dropped from the pass' name, becoming simply, the Tejon Pass as it is known today.
