= Mountain House, Kern County, California =

Overland Mail stagecoach stop in California

Coordinates: 35°41′31″N 118°55′03″W

Mountain House Station
- Interactive map of Mountain House Station
- Location: 7977 Highway 155, Woody, California, in Kern County, California

California Historical Landmark
- Official name: Mountain House Station
- Designated: May 22, 1957
- Reference no.: 589

Mountain House or Willow Springs Station, in what is now Kern County, California, United States was a stage station of the Butterfield Overland Mail, located 12 miles (19 km) south of Fountain Spring Station, and 15 miles (24 km) northeast of Posey Creek Station at Willow Springs on Willow Springs Creek.

Mountain House is a California Historical Landmark. On October 13, 1957, the California State Park Commission erected marker number 589 one and a half miles (2.4 km) south of it. Mountain House Station California Historical Landmark, signed May 22, 1957, reads:

NO. 589 MOUNTAIN HOUSE - One and one-half miles north of this point stood the Mountain House Station on the route of the Butterfield Stage. Operating through present Kern County during 1858-1861, this famous line ran from St. Louis, Missouri to San Francisco until the outbreak of the Civil War.

== See also ==
- Butterfield Overland Mail in California
- Woody, California
