= Langworth, California =

Unincorporated community in California, United States

Coordinates: 37.7536°N 120.8978°W

Langworth is a small unincorporated community in Stanislaus County, California, United States, located three miles west of Oakdale.

== History ==
Langworth is located on part of the 8 square league Rancho Thompson granted by Mexican Governor Pío Pico to Alpheus Basil Thompson in 1846. Originally the site that became Langworth was the location of Islips Ferry, westernmost crossing of the Stanislaus River, on the route of the Stockton - Los Angeles Road.

The town of Langworth was platted by Henry Langworth (or Langworthy) in 1860, and soon was home to many businesses and brick homes. The town quickly declined after the railroad was built through nearby Oakdale in 1871. Langworth was "practically extinct" by 1910.
