= Robert Wallace Webb =

American geologist (1909–1984)

- Died: March 4, 1984 (aged 74)
- Occupation: Professor of geology

Robert Wallace Webb (November 2, 1909 – March 4, 1984) was a professor of geology at the University of California, Los Angeles, and during World War II was Coordinator of Veterans Affairs for the University of California system. After World War II, Santa Barbara State College became a branch of the University of California and he transferred there in 1948 where he was one of the original professors of earth science at the University of California, Santa Barbara (UCSB).

He was particularly interested in mineralogy and, despite his many administrative assignments, continued teaching throughout his career. He taught introductory geology courses and mentored students, particularly those in the lower division who were considering majoring in geology. He also held a deep appreciation for the Sierra Nevada.

== Honours and awards ==
The Robert Wallace Webb Award is given in his name by the Far Western Section of the National Association of Geoscience Teachers. The Earth Sciences building at the UCSB campus in Goleta is named Webb Hall for him and his contributions to the Earth Science program and students at UCSB.

== Work as an Author ==
He, with his colleague, Joseph Murdoch, were long-time editors/writers of Minerals of California.

He is the author, with Robert Norris, of Geology of California, now out of print but in many libraries and available on the internet from used book sources.

== Family ==
Married to Evelyn Elaine Gourley 3 Sons all retired (2014) Robert Ian Arthur Webb Leland Frederick Webb Donald Gourley Webb All 3 are graduates of UCSB and all have PhD degrees. Ian a teacher (Electronics, Engineering, Math, Computer Info Systems) at West Valley College in Saratoga, CA Lee a teacher (Math & Math Education) at California State College, Bakersfield Don a School Psychologist for the Reno School System

== Death ==
He died near Mammoth Lakes area while leading a UCSB Geology Field Trip which was one of his volunteer twice a year pleasures during retirement.
