= Cottonwood Creek (Kern County) =

River in United States of America

Location
- Country: United States
- State: California
- Region: Tehachapi Mountains
- District: Kern County

Physical characteristics
- Source: source
  - location: near a spring on the east slope of the Tehachapi Mountains 2 miles northwest of the Libre Twins peak., Kern County
  - coordinates: 34°58′38″N 118°36′05″W
  - elevation: 5,520 ft (1,680 m)
- Mouth: mouth
  - location: in the Antelope Valley, Kern County
  - coordinates: 34°51′48″N 118°24′37″W
  - elevation: 2,726 ft (831 m)

Cottonwood Creek, is a stream in Kern County, California. Its headwaters are located on the eastern slopes of the Tehachapi Mountains, near a spring 2 miles northwest of the Libre Twins peak. It flows east then southeast into Antelope Valley in the western Mojave Desert.

== History ==
A Spanish and later Mexican road from Pueblo de Los Angeles crossed the Antelope Valley from Elizabeth Lake to Cottonwood Creek that then followed the creek up to the point where it crossed the Tehachapi Mountains at Puerto el Tejon (Tejon Pass), then following Tejon Creek down into the San Joaquin Valley. Along and south of this creek Rancho El Tejon was established in 1843. Later Gold Rush 49ers, later emigrants, and teamsters followed this route to the gold fields. In 1854, wagon traffic changed to the easier Grapevine route which became the Stockton - Los Angeles Road and the Old Tejon Pass route was gradually abandoned for the route through Fort Tejon Pass.

== See also ==
- Tehachapi Mountains topics
- Cottonwood Creek (Inyo County, California)
- Cottonwood Creek (Sacramento River)
