= White River, California =

Unincorporated community in California, United States

White River Dogtown, Tailholt
- Unincorporated community
- Interactive map of White River
- Coordinates: 35.812°N 118.844°W
- Country: United States
- State: California
- County: Tulare

California Historical Landmark
- Official name: Tailholt
- Reference no.: 413

White River is an unincorporated community in Tulare County, ten miles east of Delano, California, United States. It was founded as a gold camp in 1856, during the Kern River Gold Rush. It was first located on the Coarse Gold Gulch, two miles west of the present site and was called Dogtown.

When the first road was built to Linn's Valley, Dogtown was moved a mile and a half west to the road. Its name was changed to Tailholt after one of the first stagecoaches to stop in town provided the new name, due to a humorous incident. It involved a lady passenger on the stagecoach who grabbed the tail of her dog as it jumped out the window in pursuit of a cat. She hung on screaming for help until the owner of the local restaurant, Mother Cummings, came to her rescue. While she was lifting the dog through the window of the coach she said, "Well Ma'am, a tail-holt is better than a no holt at all". The coach driver, Yank, on his return to Visalia told the postmaster and keeper of the stage station there that the new name of the town was Tailholt. Its name was later changed to the more respectable White River.
