= Tejon Pass =

Mountain pass in California, US

- Portezuelo de Cortes; Portezuela de Castac
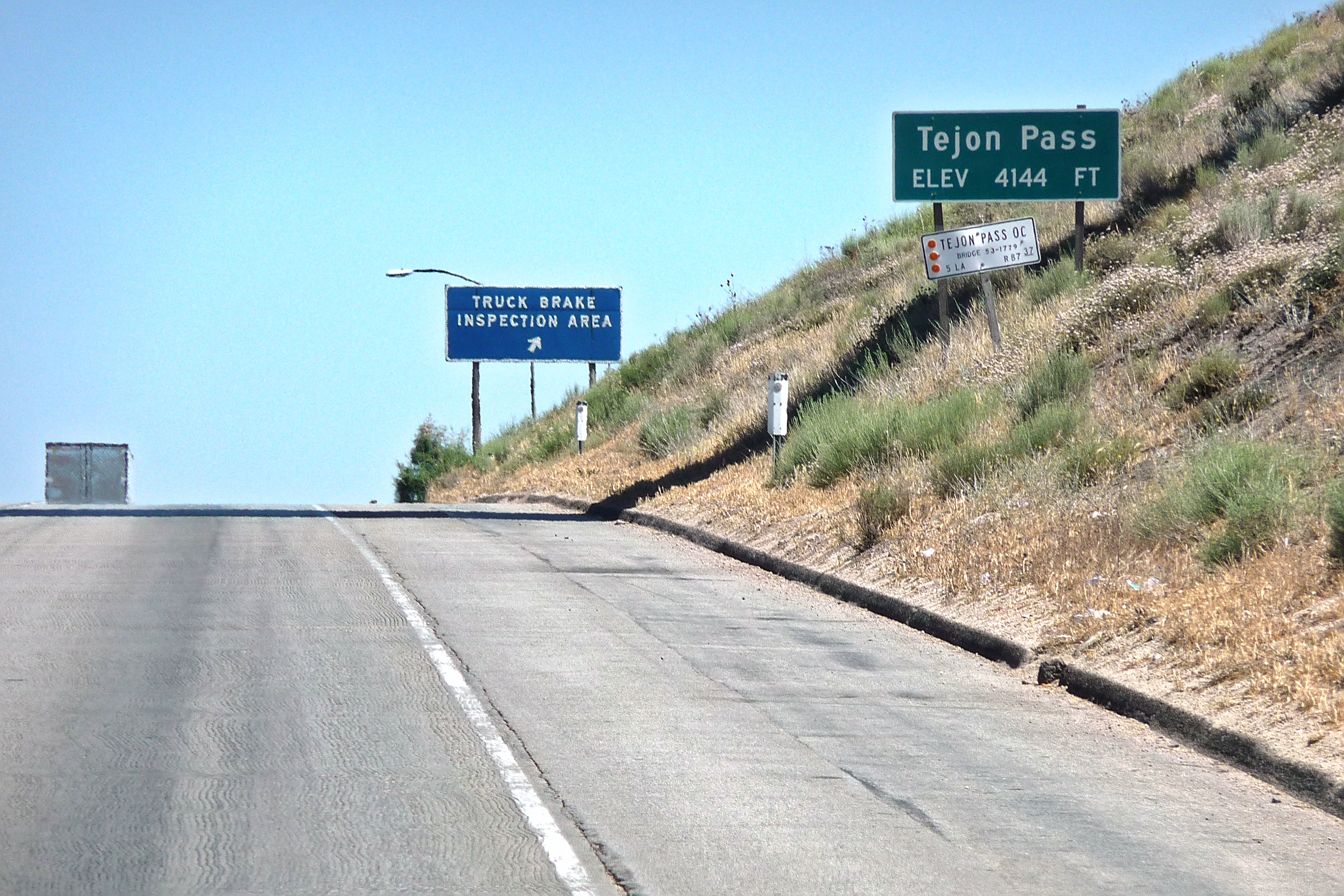
- The top of the Tejon Pass on southbound Interstate 5 (2009)

- Location within California
- Elevation: 4,144 ft (1,263 m)
- Traversed by: I-5

Third Approach
- Location: Los Angeles and Kern counties, California
- Range: San Emigdio, Tehachapi, and Sierra Pelona Mountains
- Coordinates: 34°48′10″N 118°52′36″W

The Tejon Pass /teɪˈhoʊn, təˈhoʊn, ˈteɪ.hoʊn/, previously known as Portezuelo de Cortes, Portezuela de Castac, and Fort Tejon Pass is a mountain pass between the southwest end of the Tehachapi Mountains and northeastern San Emigdio Mountains, linking Southern California north to the Central Valley. Both the pass and the grade north of it to the Central Valley are commonly referred to as "the Grapevine". It has been traversed by major roads such as the El Camino Viejo, the Stockton – Los Angeles Road, the Ridge Route, U.S. Route 99, and now Interstate 5.

== Geography ==
Tejon Pass marks the intersection of the two largest seismic faults in California; the San Andreas and Garlock fault systems.

The highest point of the pass is near the northwesternmost corner of Los Angeles County, north of Gorman. Its elevation is 4,160 feet (1,270 m) along Peace Valley Road and Gorman Post Road, 70 miles (110 km) northwest of downtown Los Angeles and 46 miles (74 km) south of Bakersfield.

Interstate 5, which connects Southern California with the San Joaquin Valley and the north, reaches its highest point in the state, 4,144 feet (1,263 m), near the summit of Tejon Pass.

The pass has a gradual rise from its southern approach of 1,362 feet (415 m) at Santa Clarita, but a precipitous descent through Grapevine Canyon toward the San Joaquin Valley on the north, where it ends at Grapevine at 1,499 feet (457 m).

On its northward slope lies Fort Tejon State Historic Park, the site of a former U.S. Army post, first garrisoned on August 10, 1854.

The pass actually crosses 3 mountain ranges. The stretch from Lake Hughes Road to State Route 138 crosses the Sierra Pelona Mountains, and goes through the Angeles National Forest and the section from SR 138 to Grapevine crosses the Tehachapis and the San Emigdios.

== History ==
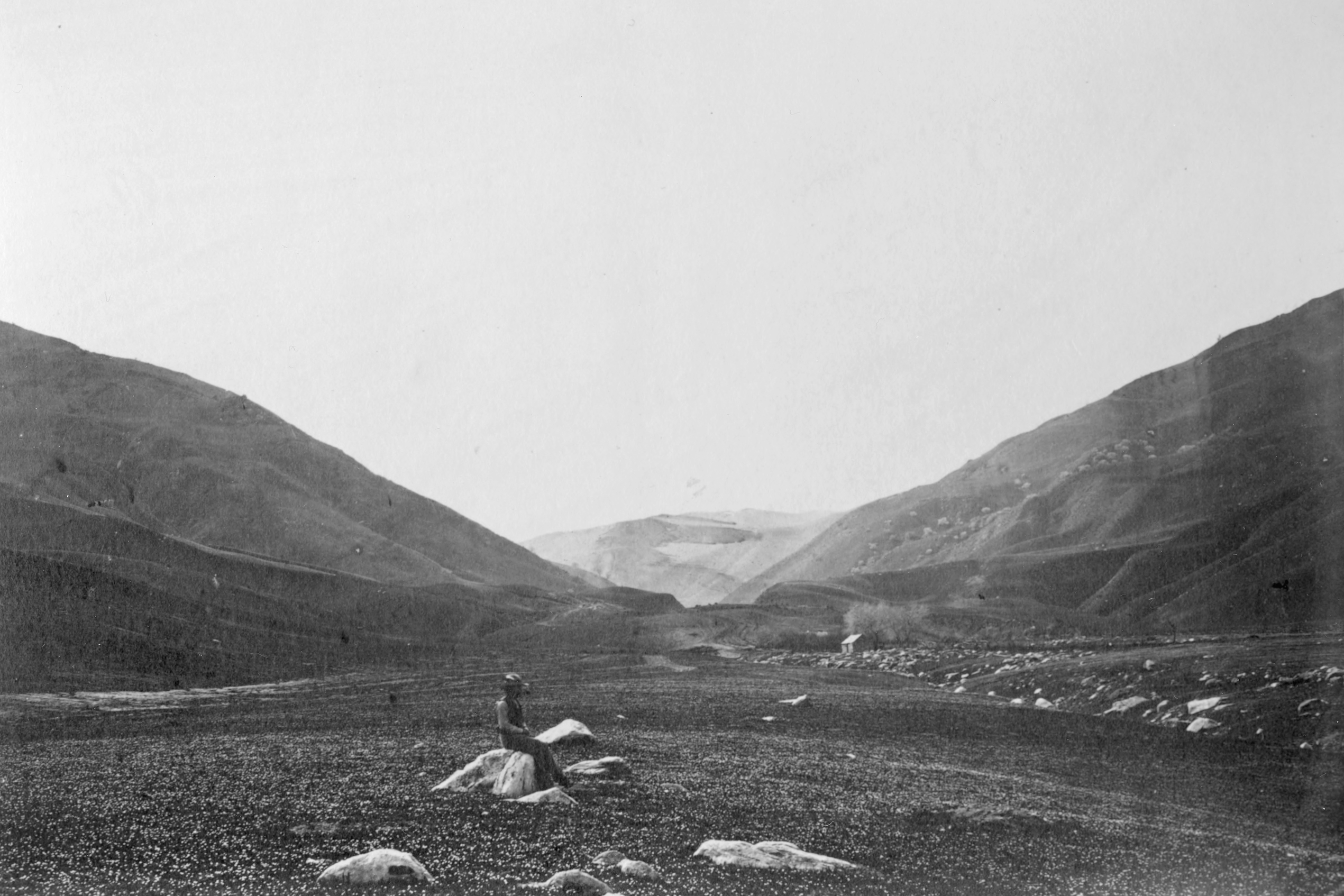
Tejon Pass near Grapevine, California, in 1868

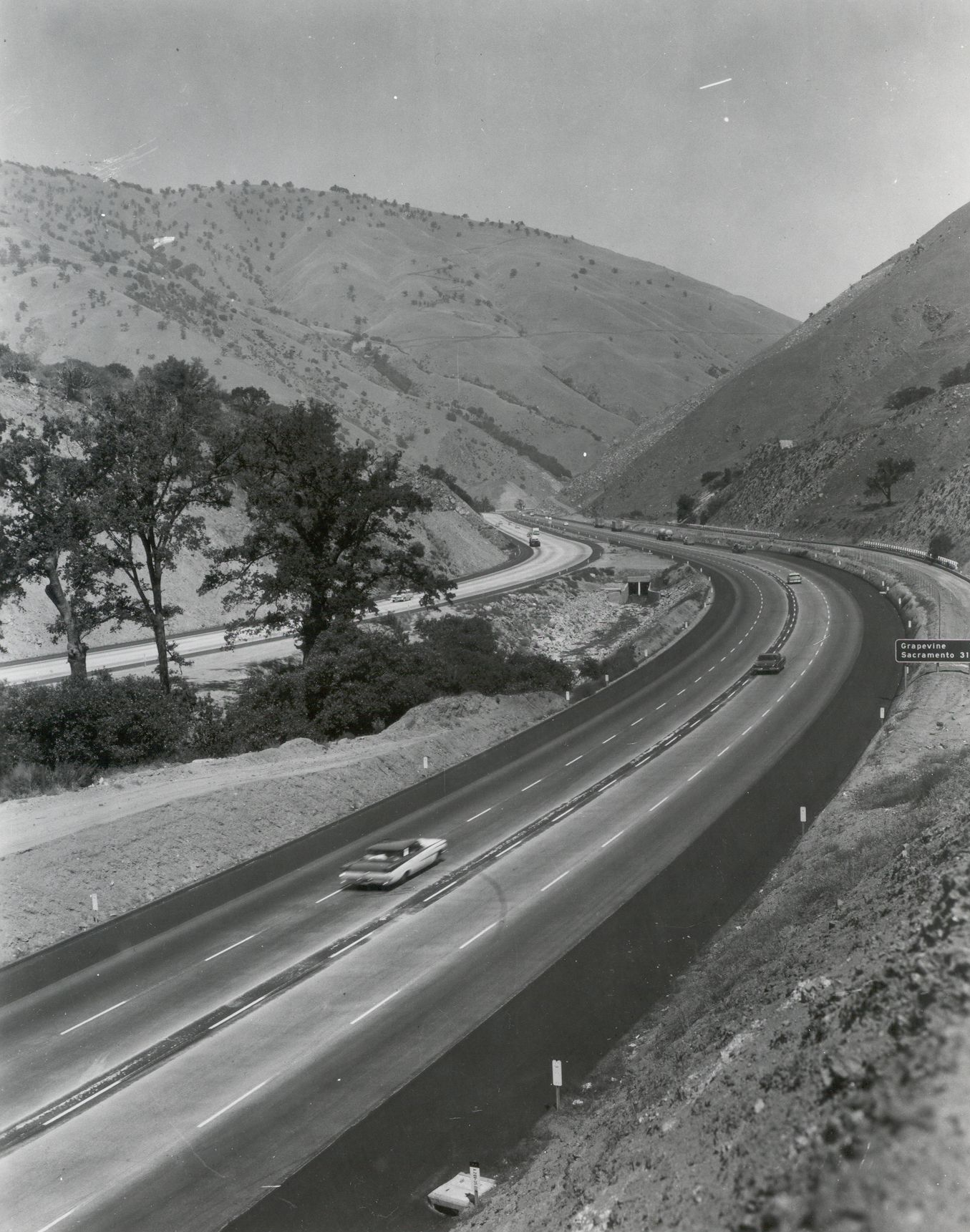
Interstate 5 through Tejon Pass, 1963

=== Pre-Columbian ===
Historians speak of the area around Gorman, California (just south of the crest of the Tejon Pass), as "one of the oldest continuously used roadside rest stops in California." This is because pre-Columbian indigenous Californians "would have stopped there when it was the Tataviam village of Kulshra'jek", a trading crossroads for hundreds to thousands of years.

=== 18th century ===
In 1772, Lieutenant Pedro Fages crossed the pass in pursuit of military deserters, and named it Portezuelo de Cortes (Cortes Pass). Fages also named the canyon beyond the pass leading down into the Tulare Basin, Cañada de las Uvas (Canyon of the Grapes) for all the wild California grape vines (Vitis californica) growing in it.

In the late 18th century, El Camino Viejo, a road between Los Angeles and the Mission Santa Clara de Asis began to be used for travel north and south along the western San Joaquin Valley. It crossed over the pass and turned westward up Cuddy Canyon, (avoiding the Cañada de las Uvas) and then descended San Emigdio Creek into the San Joaquin Valley.

=== Old Tejon Pass ===
In 1806, Father Jose Maria Zalvidea, diarist for the expedition of First Lieutenant Francisco Ruiz into the San Joaquin Valley, named the canyon, creek, and pass which had been discovered in 1776 by the explorer priest, Father Francisco Garces. He recorded the name as "Tejon" (badger)—after a dead badger found at the canyon's mouth. This original Tejon Pass (later called "Old Tejon Pass"), is situated 15 miles to the northeast of what is now Tejon Pass. The old pass goes through the Tehachapi Mountains, at the top of the divide between Tejon Creek Canyon in the San Joaquin Valley and Cottonwood Creek Canyon in Antelope Valley.

Before 1854, the main route of travel into the San Joaquin Valley had come directly north from Elizabeth Lake (originally Laguna de Chico Lopez) across the Antelope Valley, over this original Tejon Pass, and down into Tejon Canyon, and then proceeded west along Tejon Creek—into the lands of the Rancho Tejon, that had been granted in 1843. This route to the pass diverted from the El Camino Viejo at Elisabeth Lake, and from 1849 to before 1854 it was the main road connecting the southern part of the state to the trail along the eastern side of the San Joaquin Valley to the goldfields to the north.

=== 19th century ===
==== Castaic Pass ====
In 1843, Rancho Castac was established in La Cañada de las Uvas. During that same year, the first grant of Rancho Los Alamos y Agua Caliente included the pass, which was now called Portezuela de Castac (Castaic Pass).

==== Fort Tejon Pass ====
After the establishment of Fort Tejon and the Stockton - Los Angeles Road, the Portezuela de Castac began to be called the "Fort Tejon Pass." The rather poor wagon route of the old Tejon Pass route was generally abandoned, and eventually the Fort Tejon Pass took the shortened name it has today.

In 1858 the Butterfield Overland Mail stagecoach line ran through the pass on the Stockton - Los Angeles Road. The Butterfield Overland was discontinued in 1861 but was replaced by the Telegraph Stage Line, which stopped at almost all the former stations, including Gorman's, where the horses were changed. Six of them were used for the pull up from Bakersfield to Gorman's.

=== 20th century ===
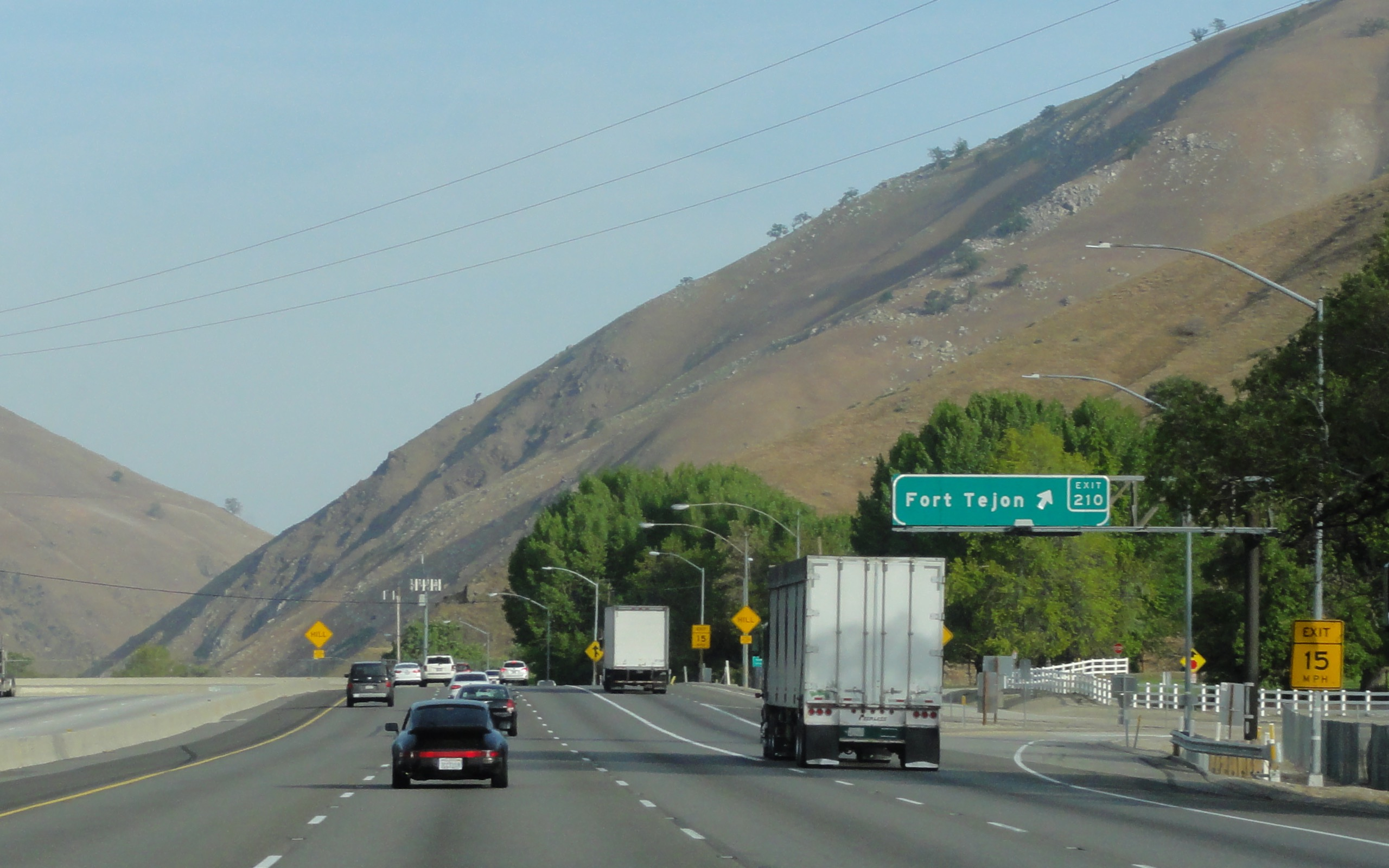
The exit to Fort Tejon, on the northward slope of the Tejon Pass just before descending into the Central Valley

The Ridge Route was the first automobile highway linking the Central Valley with the Los Angeles Basin. It was laid in a sinuous fashion through the ridges and gullies of the Sierra Pelona Mountains to the Tejon Pass around 1910. The northern portion of this highway, which became a part of U.S. Route 99, was known as "The Grapevine." The Ridge Route was replaced by a three-lane alternate highway in 1933, a four-lane expressway in 1947, and later by the eight-lane Interstate 5 Freeway in 1970.

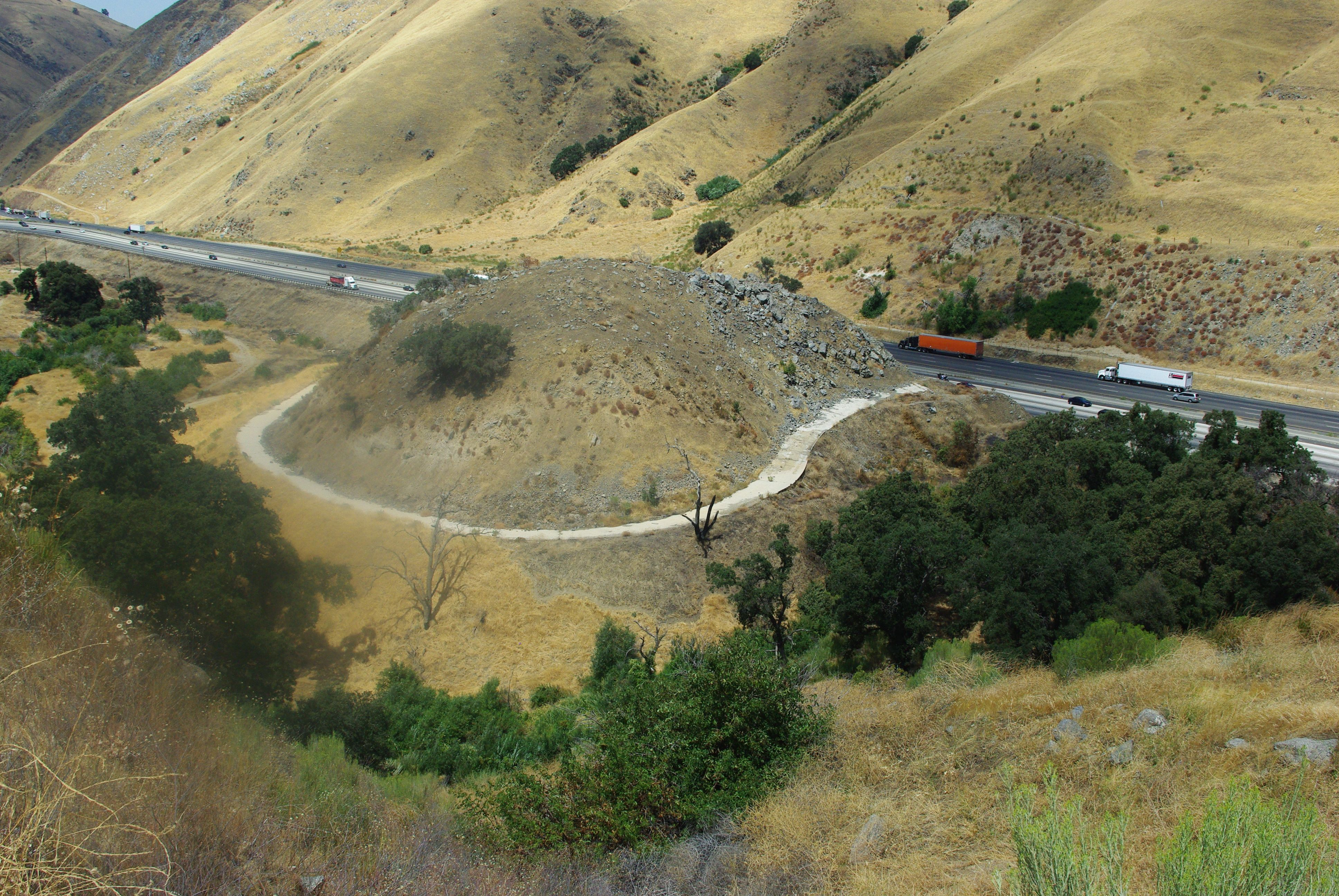
A section of the 1915 Ridge Route in Lebec, California, known as "deadman's curve," was abandoned when the highway was improved over the Tejon Pass.

A section of the highway known as "Dead Man's Curve," was the "scene of many accidents on the narrow old road," and in July 1932 it took the life of Jack Klieby, 33, who deliberately drove his truck, transporting gasoline, off the roadway to avoid hitting oncoming automobiles. He died when the truck burst into flames.

The curve (in adjoining photo) was eliminated in 1935 with improvements completed from Fort Tejon to Grapevine station. That work "supersedes the worst portions of the old twenty-foot Grapevine Canyon Highway, shortens the length of the road by approximately eight-tenths of a mile and eliminates 2,937 degrees of curvature or the equivalent of eight complete circles," according to R.M. Gillis of Fresno, District 6 highways engineer.

== Wildlife ==
Bears roam the rugged area.

== Weather impacts ==
The pass is sunny in summer, spring, and autumn, but is subject to severe weather and closure to traffic in winter. Car engines frequently overheat when ascending the long grade, especially in hot weather. The 40-mile stretch of Interstate 5 between Grapevine and Castaic is sometimes closed by the California Highway Patrol, generally because of the icy conditions combined with the steep grade of the pass, and the high traffic during the winter holidays. The Highway Patrol is also concerned, especially with the number of big-rigs that pass through, that one accident in the snowy conditions might force traffic to slow down or come to a complete stop, leaving hundreds of vehicles stalled at once. Whenever there is such a closure, traffic must either wait for it to reopen, or endure a multi-hour detour.

== Communities ==
This historic gap has given its name to the Mountain Communities of the Tejon Pass. Beginning on the south at Santa Clarita, it passes through Castaic, Gorman, and Lebec, to end at Grapevine. It passes by the Tejon Ranch, where two large planned communities—Centennial and Tejon Mountain Village—are proposed.

== See also ==
- Tehachapi Pass, used by the rail lines connecting southern and northern California.
