= Rancho El Tejón =

Land grant in California

Coordinates: 35.04742°N 118.75998°W

Rancho El Tejón was a 97,617-acre (395.04 km^{2}) Mexican land grant in the Tehachapi Mountains and northeastern San Emigdio Mountains, in present-day Kern County, California. It was granted in 1843 by Governor Manuel Micheltorena to José Antonio Aguirre and Ygnacio del Valle. The rancho is now a part of the 270,000 acres (1,093 km^{2}) Tejon Ranch.

El Tejón means badger in Spanish.

When California was founded as a state in 1850, Rancho El Tejón served as a boundary marker for several counties, first anchoring the junction of Mariposa, Los Angeles and San Diego counties, changing in a few years to a boundary marker between Tulare, Kern and San Bernardino when counties were reworked. Some confusion was caused by the indistinct definition of the original Mexican land grant, and the lack of a modern survey to establish the exact boundary of Rancho El Tejón.

== History ==
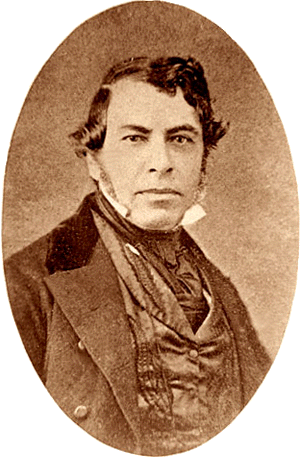
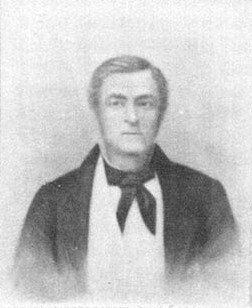
Rancho El Tejón was granted to Californio rancheros Ygnacio del Valle (left) and José Antonio Aguirre (right) in 1843, by Governor Micheltorena.

=== Mexican era ===
José Antonio Aguirre (1799–1860) was a merchant who lived in Santa Barbara and San Diego. Ygnacio del Valle (1808–1880) was a landowner and one time alcalde of Pueblo of Los Angeles. Neither of the owners lived on the rancho. They chose instead to hire a "mayordomo" (ranch foreman) to be in full charge of the vaqueros needed to guard the cattle.

=== American era ===
With the cession of California to the United States following the Mexican-American War, the 1848 Treaty of Guadalupe Hidalgo provided that the land grants would be honored. As required by the Land Act of 1851, a claim for Rancho El Tejon was filed with the Public Land Commission in 1852, and the grant was patented to Aguirre and del Valle in 1863.

The Sebastian Indian Reservation (Tejon Indian Reservation) was located in the Tejon Creek Canyon section of the rancho from 1853 to 1864. It was the first Indian reservation in California, used primarily to manage the Emigdiano band Chumash people. It was established by Edward F. Beale, when he was the federal Superintendent of Indian Affairs for California.

Aguirre sold his undivided half interest in Rancho El Tejón to Jonathan (Juan) Temple in 1857.

In 1865, Beale purchased Rancho El Tejón from Ygnacio del Valle and Juan Temple. Beale would acquire three other Mexican Land Grants — Rancho Los Alamos y Agua Caliente, Rancho Castac and Rancho La Liebre — to create the present Tejon Ranch.

== See also ==
- Fort Tejon
- Old Tejon Pass
- Ranchos of California
- List of Ranchos of California
- Index of Tehachapi Mountains articles
