= Grapevine, California =

- Unincorporated community
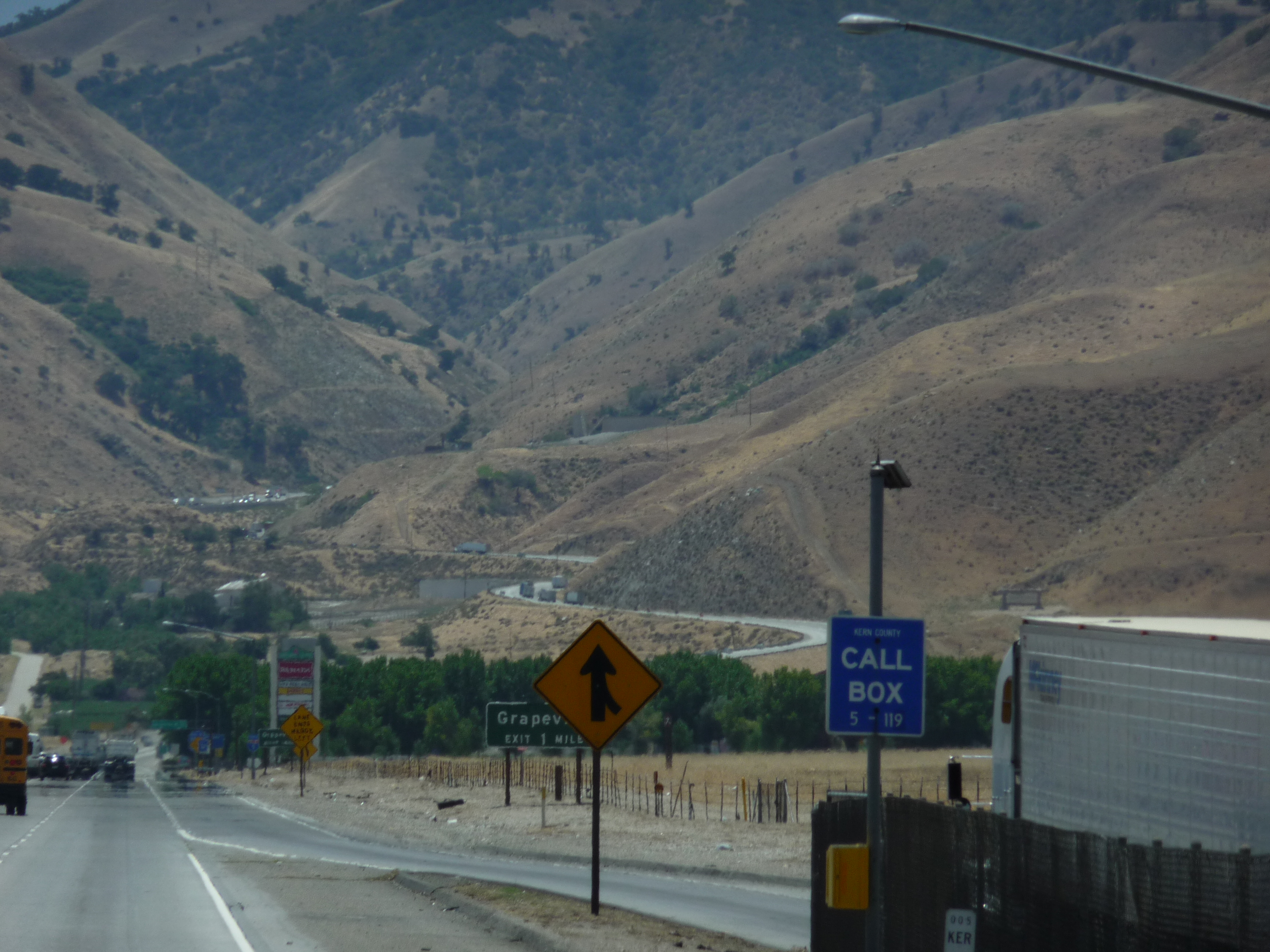
- The Grapevine, looking south (2009)

- Location in California Grapevine (the United States)
- Coordinates: 34.941°N 118.931°W
- Country: United States
- State: California
- County: Kern
- Elevation: 1,499 ft (457 m)
- ZIP Code: 93243
- Area code: 661

California Historical Landmark
- Official name: Top of Grapevine Pass
- Reference no.: 283

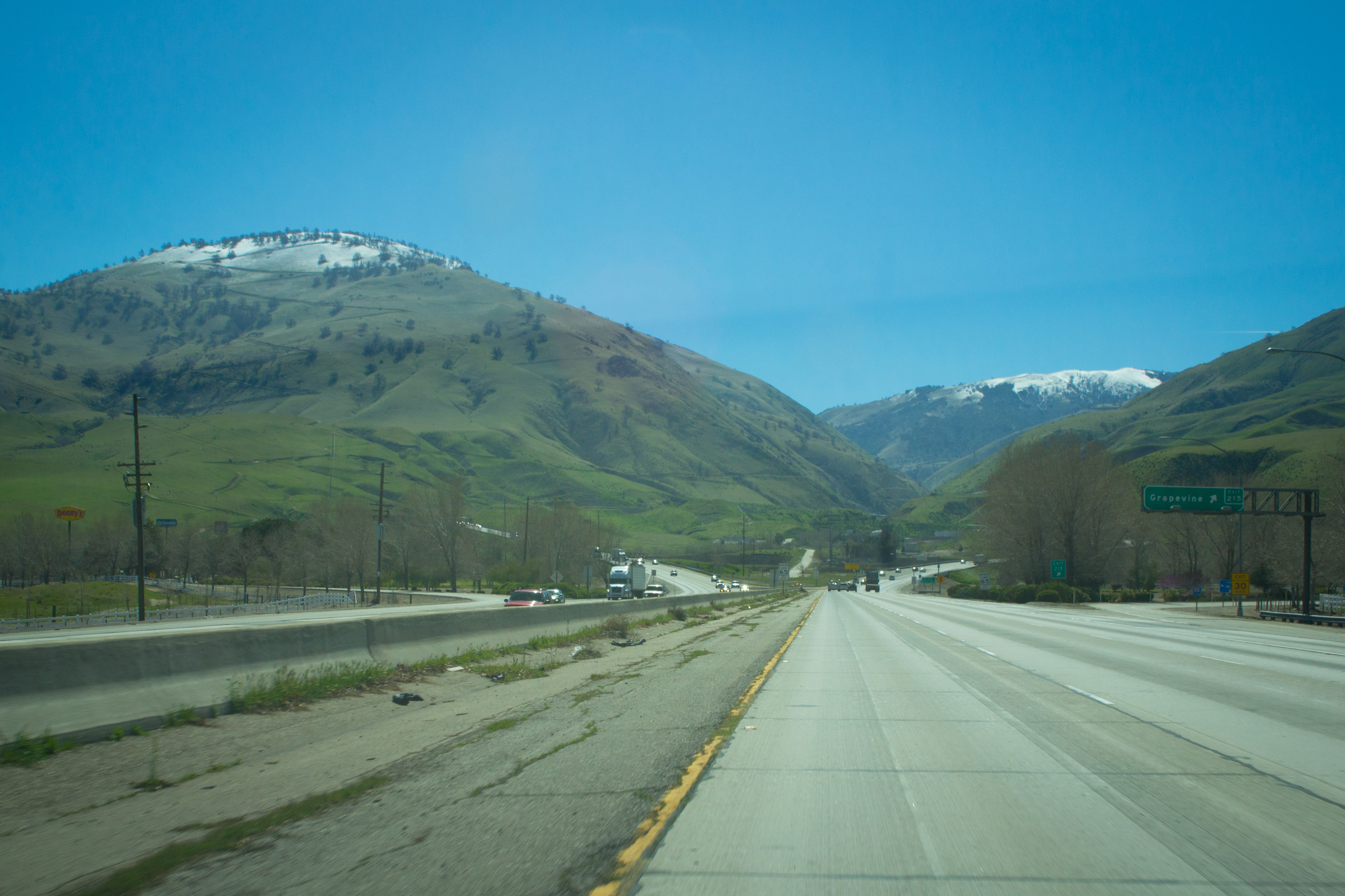
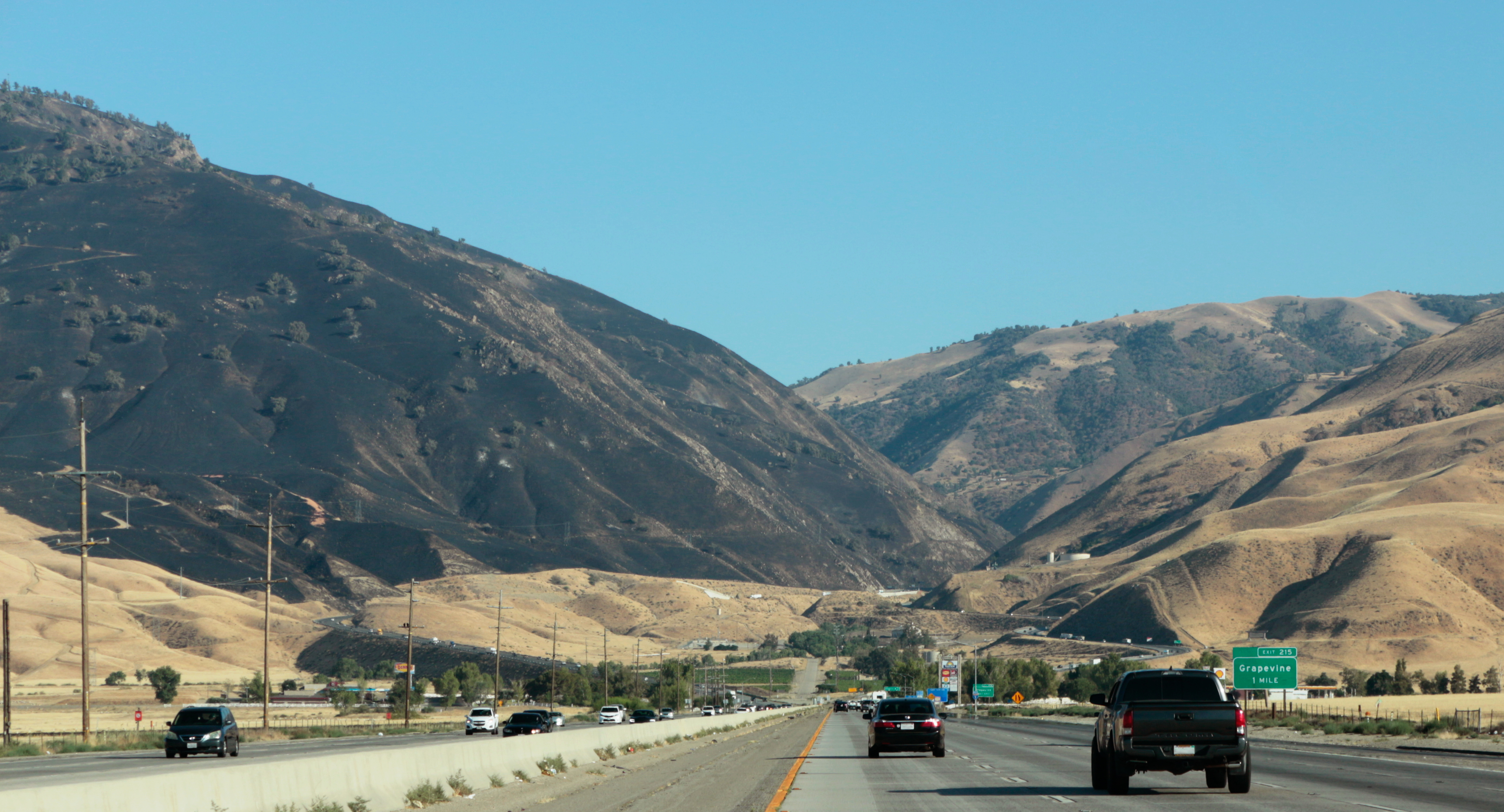
Grapevine, looking south from I-5 in March 2013 (left) and July 2021 (right)

Grapevine is an unincorporated community in Kern County, California, United States, at the southern end of the San Joaquin Valley. The small village is directly adjacent to Interstate 5 and consists mainly of gas stations, motels and other roadside services. At an elevation of 1,499 ft (457 m), the community is located at the foot of a grade known as The Grapevine that lies in Grapevine Canyon through the Tejon Pass.

== Etymology ==
The village and grade are named for the canyon through which a trail passed, after the wild grapes that grow along the original road. Its Spanish name is La Cañada de las Uvas, that is, Grapevine Ravine.

== Geography ==
The ZIP Code is 93243, and the community is inside telephone area code 661. A United States post office operated at Grapevine from 1923 to 1960. The community of Wheeler Ridge lies three miles north of Grapevine on Interstate 5, with Lebec nine miles south.

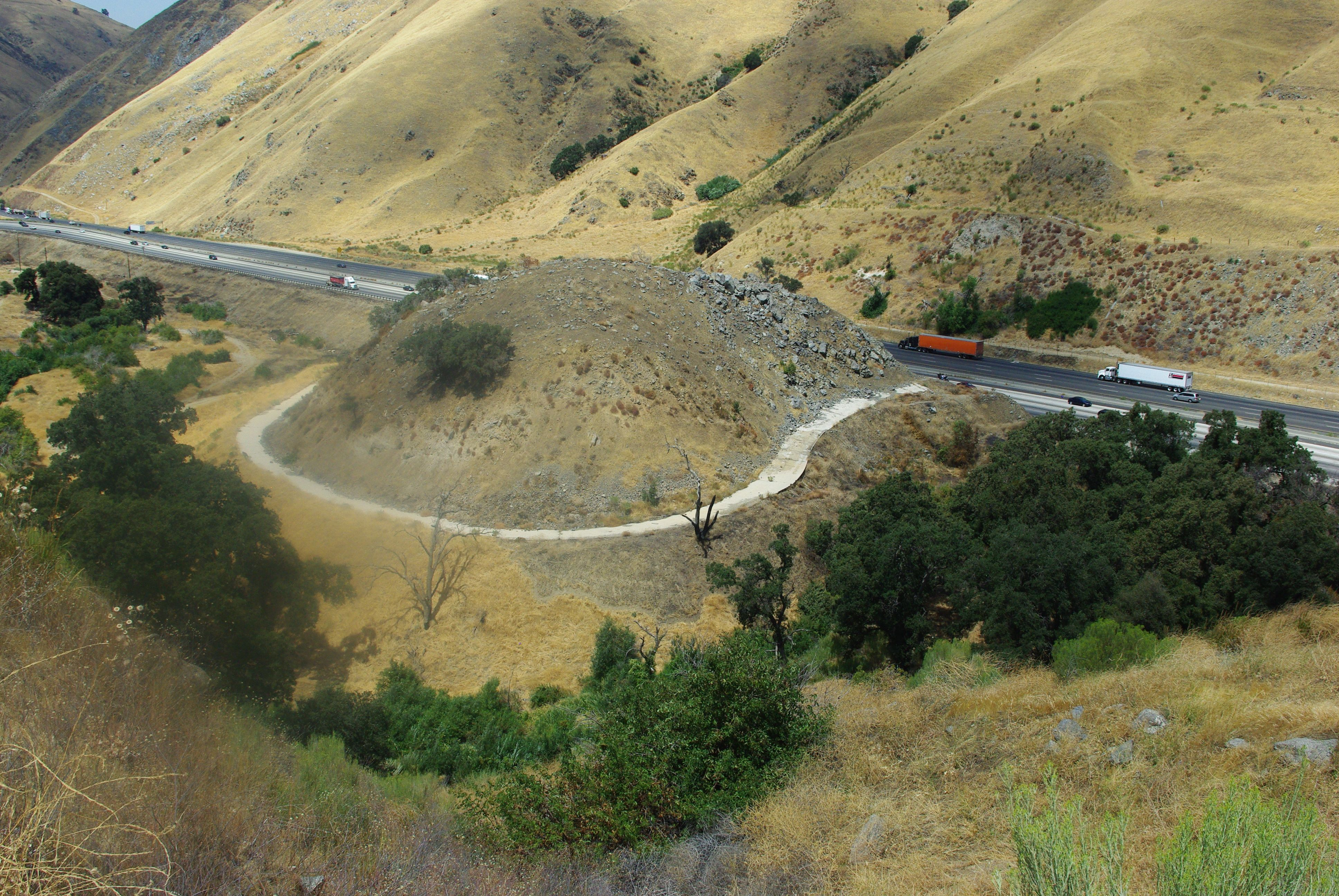
A section of the 1915 Ridge Route between Grapevine and Lebec, California, abandoned when U.S. Route 99 (later upgraded to I-5) was constructed over the Tejon Pass in order to make travel straighter and safer

Before the road was straightened and widened during 1933–1934 by the three-lane Ridge Route Alternate (U.S. Route 99), the Grapevine was infamous for its high accident rate. Escape ramps branch off both sides of the downward part of the road for heavy trucks whose brakes fail on this five-mile, 6% grade that descends 1,600 ft (490 m).

The Grapevine is subject to severe weather and closure to traffic in winter. The stretch of I-5 through the Grapevine and the Tejon Pass is sometimes closed by the California Highway Patrol, generally because of icy conditions in winter months, combined with the steep grade of the pass and the high volume of traffic. Occasionally, heavy rains will cause mud and rock slides, closing the highway. The Highway Patrol is also concerned, especially with the large number of big-rigs that pass through, that just one accident in the icy or snowy conditions might force traffic to slow down or come to a complete stop, leaving hundreds of vehicles stalled at once. Whenever there is such a closure, traffic must either wait for it to reopen, or endure a slow, multi-hour detour.

== Landmark ==
The top of the Grapevine is registered as California Historical Landmark #283, where Don Pedro Fages passed through in 1772 during his explorations through California.

== Future development ==
The Tejon Ranch Company is planning further development in the area, which it identified as at "the northern base of the Interstate 5 Grapevine, starting at the foothills in the southernmost portion of the San Joaquin Valley, extending parallel to the Tejon Ranch Commerce Center along I-5". A company spokesman said the development would result in 12,000 to 14,000 homes and 5.1 million square feet of commercial development. In addition, the company has identified 7,000 additional acres for a development to be called Grapevine North.

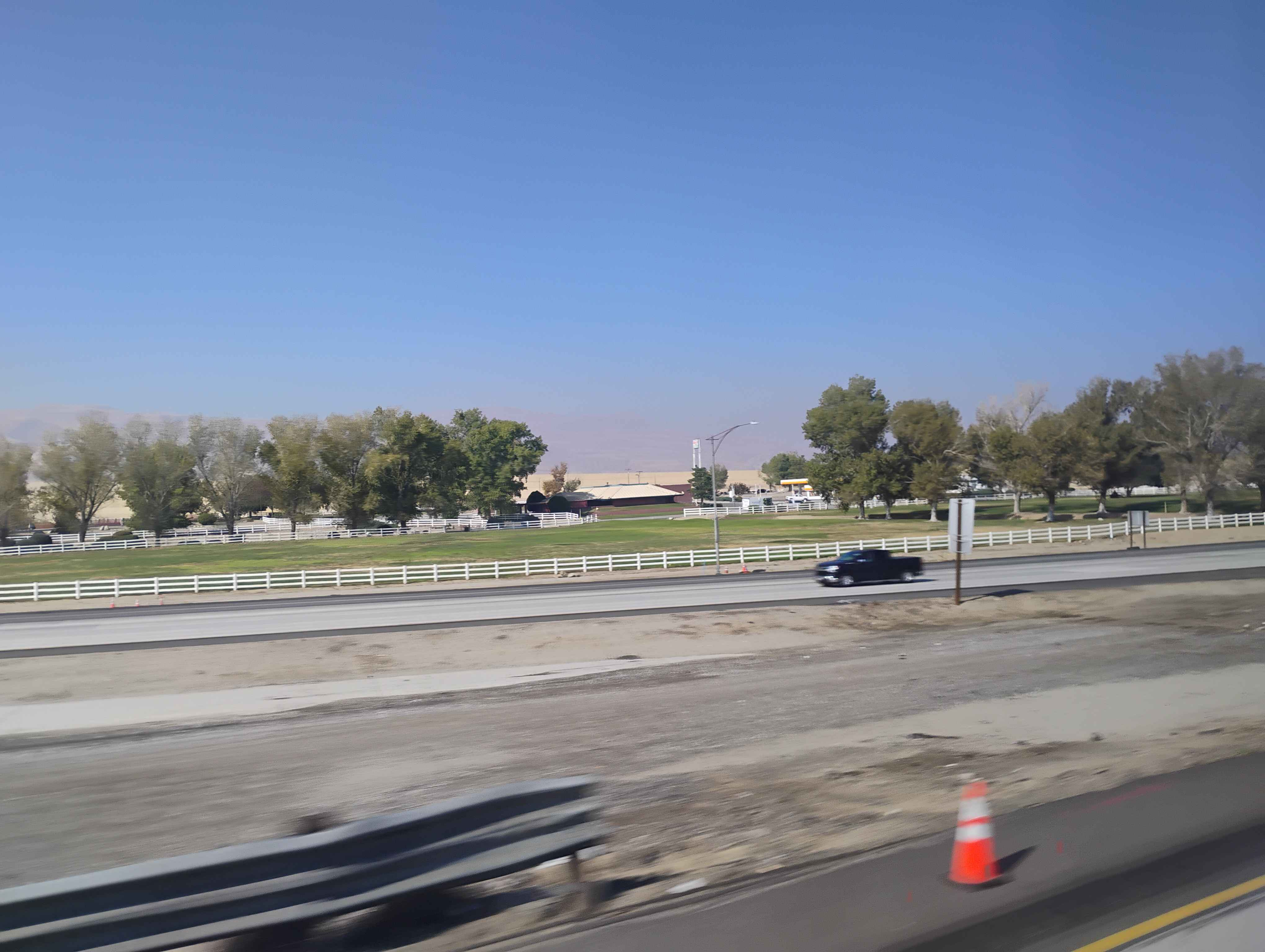
Grapevine, CA in 2025.

== See also ==
- Ridge Route, the former route, now bypassed by Interstate 5
- California Historical Landmarks in Kern County
- California Historical Landmark

== Additional reading ==
- Paul Duginski, "The Grapevine Is the Heart of California's Freeway System; It's Also Vulnerable," Los Angeles Times, December 28, 2019
