= Tejon Mountain Village =

Proposed community in Kern County, California, United States

Coordinates: 34.8359°N 118.8433°W

Tejon Mountain Village is a proposed residential, commercial, and recreational development of pristine, rugged property in the Tehachapi Mountains owned by the Tejon Ranch Company in Lebec, southern Kern County, California. The development includes the largest conservation and land-use agreement in California history. It was approved by the county's Board of Supervisors in October 2009. Opponents launched a legal challenge that was denied in state district court in April 2012.

The pact between the Tejon Ranch Company and a coalition of environmental groups, announced in May 2008, is designed to permanently protect 240,000 acres (970 km^{2}) of the ranch, including a vast amount outside the borders of the Tejon Mountain Village subdivision.

== Planned development ==
Now approved by Kern County, but a matter of debate for years in the Mountain Communities of the Tejon Pass, the development would include homes, commercial buildings, hotels, and golf courses.

Tejon Mountain Village would be a 5,082-acre (20.57 km^{2}) gated community amid 26,417 acres of Tejon Ranch property. It would include two golf courses, 3,450 homes, a 160,000-square-foot (15,000 m^{2})-shopping center near Interstate 5, two heliports, and a maximum of 750 hotel rooms.

Houses and apartments would be grouped in small enclaves around the lake and on the level tops of surrounding ridges. Larger lot custom homes would rise from the more remote hilltops in the northwest and northeast sections of the development area. Buildings would be designed to fit into the existing land rather than the land being molded to fit the buildings.

Residential lots would range in size from 6,700 square feet (620 m^{2}) to more than 20 acres (81,000 m^{2}). There would be two heliports, two 18-hole golf courses, and about 320,000 square feet (30,000 m^{2}) of support space for the "commercial amenities."

The property will be developed by a new entity, Tejon Mountain Village LLC. Originally a joint enterprise with DMB Associates of Scottsdale, Arizona, the Tejon Ranch Company bought out its partner in July 2014.

== Lawsuits ==
A coalition of environmentalists, Native Americans and local residents, including the Center for Biological Diversity, filed a lawsuit in Kern County Superior Court on November 12, 2009, to halt the development. The suit claimed the construction would threaten the California condor and negatively affect sacred Chumash sites, degrade air quality, and add traffic to nearby Interstate 5. On November 5, 2010, Kern County Superior Court Judge Kenneth Twisselman ruled in favor of Kern County, Tejon Mountain Village and its development partner, DMB Associates. The Center for Biological Diversity appealed the ruling to California's Fifth District Court of Appeal in Fresno on February 9, 2011. It was joined by the TriCounty Watchdogs, the Wishtoyo Foundation (a Chumash-oriented group interested in the environment), and the Center on Race, Poverty & the Environment.

In April 2012, Fifth District Court determined that the project could move forward. The court felt that the flaws it saw in the environmental impact report were too minor to stop the development.

Federal Judge Cormac J. Carney in December 2020 rejected a suit by opponents alleging that the development proposal should have recognized the California condor as a "traditional cultural property" deserving special protection.

The Tejon Ranch Conservancy that same year filed a suit alleging that the Tejon Ranch Company had stopped making the agreed payments; the company countersued.

== Conditions ==
In return for the county's granting a 30-year permit to complete the development instead of the standard 10 years, the developers agreed to fund six community endeavors:

- $500,000 for an expanded Frazier Mountain Park Community Center, which money would come from a fee of $1,000 on the first 500 residential units sold in the project.
- $25,000 to the local Fire-Safe Council to assist property owners in the Mountain Communities with fire-education efforts and preparation of a wildfire plan.
- $7 yearly from each residence to support tax-exempt, nonprofit organizations serving residents and to implement energy-efficiency programs in the Mountain Communities.
- $70 per parcel per year for paramedic services.
- Dedication of a public multi-use trail along the western boundary of Castac Lake.
- Funding of 1.5 years of a deputy sheriff's position (to be effective six months after the first building permit is issued).

== Concerns ==
=== Environment ===
Principal objections in the county approval process concerned the effects on wildlife, lack of sufficient water, glare from lights, air pollution, and damage to the existing community.

==== Wildlife ====
Tejon Ranch, which is the largest contiguous parcel of privately owned land in the state, is home to about 80 rare or endangered species, including the bald eagle, the California spotted owl, and the California condor, according to the Center for Biological Diversity of Tucson, Arizona. Only 150 condors were surviving in the wild in July 2008, and Tejon Ranch is one of the giant bird's prime habitats.

The Sierra Club made conserving as much of the Tejon Ranch as possible its top priority for California, Bill Corcoran, a senior regional representative, told the New York Times in 2008. He said, "There is no other place like this in California. It offers an unparalleled and irreplaceable connection between the Sierra Nevada and the Coast Ranges and the high desert."

A coalition led by the Natural Resources Defense Council, the Sierra Club, Audubon California, the Planning and Conservation League, and the Endangered Habitat League worked with the Tejon Ranch Company to develop a program that, if carried out, would conserve 90 percent of the entire Tejon Ranch. In return, the coalition agreed it would not oppose the company's plans to build Tejon Mountain Village and another big development, Centennial, in northwestern Los Angeles County.

==== Water ====
D. Adam Lazar, attorney for the Center for Biological Diversity, told the county's Board of Supervisors at its October 5, 2009, hearing that there would not be enough water for the project since it was completely dependent on the California State Water Project, which brings water from the Sacramento-San Joaquin Delta. But Ernest Conant, attorney for the Tejon Castac Water District Board, replied that some analyses had considered what might happen if supplies from the state water project were cut back to as low as 50 percent.

A community-services district for the area was created in February 2021, and the next month the water district board authorized the district to issue up to $250 million in bonds which would pay for construction of "wastewater facilities, a water storage and distribution system, roads, firehouses, a sheriff's station," and more.

==== Starlight ====
Responding to an objection that the development would ruin the dark skies of "a prime tourism area for amateur astronomers," county planner Lorelei Oviatt proposed and read into the record that the forthcoming Dark Sky Society model ordinance to control such pollution be adopted for the project.

==== Air pollution ====
Residents who complained about the risk of increased air pollution were told by Oviatt that such concerns "had been addressed" by the San Joaquin Valley Air Pollution Control District.

==== Community life ====
Two Planning Commissioners voted against the plan at the commission's September 10, 2009, meeting. One of them cited the "scale" of the undertaking, saying that "I can't help but feel that this isn't a plan that benefits the existing communities of Lebec and Frazier Park," and attorney Keats of the Center for Biological Diversity compared the "corporate greed" of Wall Street, "which owns this company" to the drive to develop Tejon Mountain Village for the "helicopter playboys" who would live there.

Support for the project came from representatives of the Mountain Communities Chamber of Commerce, the Mountain Shakespeare Festival, the Kern County Board of Trade, and the Greater Bakersfield Chamber of Commerce.

=== Native American claims ===
==== Legal filing ====
A federal court suit was also filed in November 2009 in Fresno by the Kawaiisu (KAH'-yah WAH'-soo) Tribe of Native Americans, arguing that U.S. officials failed to recognize the tribe's claim to areas of the 270,000-acre (1,100 km^{2}) Tejon Ranch property where the TMV project is planned and that the Kern County supervisors ignored the existence of tribal sites when they approved the plan. That suit sought an injunction suspending development and compensation for use of the land and the tribe's pain and suffering.

David Laughing Horse Robinson, who said he was an elder of the tribe of Native Americans, claimed in an e-mail that Tejon Ranch did not own the land beneath the proposed project. He said in a video later posted on Youtube.com that the land was "stolen."

His claim was countered a few days later by Julie Turner, secretary of the Kern Valley Indian Community, who said in a letter to Kern County Planners that Robinson "isn't the tribal chairman." And Laer Pierce, a spokesman for the Tejon project, said that a Tejon-Sebastian native reservation existed only between 1853 and 1864, when the reservation was "dissolved by Congress."

On January 24, 2011, Federal court Judge Oliver Wanger ruled against Robinson, an instructional technician at California State University, Bakersfield.

Native American spokesmen said the project troubled them. Chumash ceremonial leader Mat Waiya said that Tejon Ranch had disturbed Indian cultural sites in the early 2000s but that the ranch had followed protocols since then. The developer has now agreed to provide a 2,500-square-foot (230 m^{2}) facility in the commercial center for a museum that could serve as a repository for artifacts.

==== Ruling ====
The claim by the Kawaiisu Tribe of Tejon that tried to assert title to the 270,000 acres comprising the Tejon Ranch was rejected by the Ninth U.S. Circuit Court of Appeals in June 2015.

Among other things, the three-judge panel rejected the tribe’s complaints of alleged forgery and deception in obtaining patents for the four Mexican land grants comprising Tejon Ranch. It says the tribe could not challenge the validity of land patents after more than a century of time had passed. In its decision, the court reached back through the history of the multiple failures of Congress and Presidents to ratify agreements with Indian tribes in the 1850s. The Kawaiisu Tribe alleges that the Tejon/Sebastian Reservation was created pursuant to the Act of 1853, pointing to a letter from President Franklin Pierce to the Secretary of the Interior, Robert McClelland, and a subsequent letter from the Secretary to the Superintendent of Indian Affairs for California, Edward Beale, from that same year.

=== Sufficiency of notice ===
Adam Keats, an attorney for the Center for Biological Diversity, said he believed the county had violated the California Environmental Quality Act, or CEQA, with a "rushed public hearing process." And Patric Hedlund, the editor of a local weekly newspaper, The Mountain Enterprise, wrote that the draft environmental impact report on the village was "15 notebooks, 13 of them 5.5 inches thick, two others adding four more inches, plus two rolls of large maps. They add up to a tower nearly six feet tall." She compared the report to "a six-foot stranger on the front porch, gawky and inscrutable, standing there for your consideration." The county also offered a set of four compact disks and put out a smaller, "2.5-foot stack" in the Frazier Park library.

Lorelei Oviatt, division chief of Kern County's Planning Department, spoke at a subsequent community meeting to explain "how to navigate the data to make effective comments." "We believe this project has been thoroughly reviewed," Oviatt later told the Bakersfield Californian.

== See also ==
- Rancho Castac, a Mexican land grant in the area
- Mountain Communities of the Tejon Pass
