= Rancho Los Álamos y Agua Caliente =

Mexican land grant near present day Lebec, California

Coordinates: 34°51′04″N 118°48′12″W

Rancho Los Álamos y Agua Caliente was a 26,626-acre (107.75 km^{2}) Mexican land grant in present-day Kern County, California given in 1846 by Governor Pio Pico to Francisco Lopes, Luis Jordan and Vicente Botiller. The name means "Cottonwoods and Hot Springs Ranch" in Spanish. The native riparian Fremont Cottonwood (Populus fremontii) grow around natural springs. Rancho Los Álamos y Agua Caliente lay between two other Mexican Land Grants in the Tehachapi Mountains, Rancho El Tejon and Rancho Castac. The rancho is now a part of the 270,000-acre (1,093 km^{2}) Tejon Ranch.

== History ==
A grant was made to Pedro Carrillo by Governor Manuel Micheltorena in 1843, that included Hungry Valley, Cañada de los Alamos and Peace Valley, the later area of the Hungry Valley State Vehicular Recreation Area, Gorman and the Tejon Pass (then called Portezuela de Castac or Castac Pass), but Carrillo failed to comply with any of its conditions. In 1846, Governor Pío Pico declared that "Taking into consideration the seven months granted to citizen Pedro Carrillo to stock the land granted to him in conformity with the colonization laws, and of the injury caused to the industry of the country on account of his not occupying it, the denunciation of the tract of the Álamos and Agua Caliente in favor of the applicants may take place, to whom the proper title shall be issued," and on the same day a title was issued to Agustín Olvera. This grant covered a different section of land than the first.

With the cession of California to the United States following the Mexican-American War, the 1848 Treaty of Guadalupe Hidalgo provided that the land grants would be honored. As required by the Land Act of 1851, a claim for Rancho Los Álamos y Agua Caliente was filed with the Public Land Commission in 1852, The grant was patented to Agustín Olvera, Louis Jordan, and J.L. Brent in 1866. A separate claim was filed by Pedro Carrillo but was rejected due to his previous noncompliance with the original granting conditions.

In 1865, Edward Beale purchased Rancho los Álamos y Agua Caliente from Agustín Olvera, Cristobal Aguilar, and James L. Gibbens. Beale would acquire three other Mexican land grants (Rancho El Tejon, Rancho Castac and Rancho La Liebre) to create the present-day Tejon Ranch.

== See also ==
- Ranchos of California
- List of Ranchos of California
