= Fort Tejon Historical Association =

Historical society in Kern County, California

The Fort Tejon Historical Association (FTHA) is a historical society dedicated to preserving the historic site at Fort Tejon State Historic Park, in Kern County, California, and educating the public about the fort’s role in 19th century California and U.S. history.

== History ==
Fort Tejon was established in 1854 at Tejon Pass, in the canyon between the San Emigdio Mountains and Tehachapi Mountains. It is located near present-day Gorman on Interstate 5 in California.

The Association was incorporated as a non-profit organization on August 1, 1983.

== Organization ==
The Fort Tejon Historical Association organizes a Civil War reenactments every year in June. As of 2019, it had approximately 70 members.

The FTHA is governed by a board of directors of six people. Current officers are as follows.

Position	Officer
President and Chairperson	Karina Dunbar
Executive Secretary	John Billinger
Treasurer	Kevin Dunbar
Website, Newsletter, and IT Support	Matt Schnittker
Civil War Program Director	Mike Foster
Board Member / Historic Expert	Sean Malis

== See also ==
- Fort Tejon
- American Civil War reenactment
- Mountain Communities of the Tejon Pass
