= Castac Lake =

Endorheic lake in Lebec, California

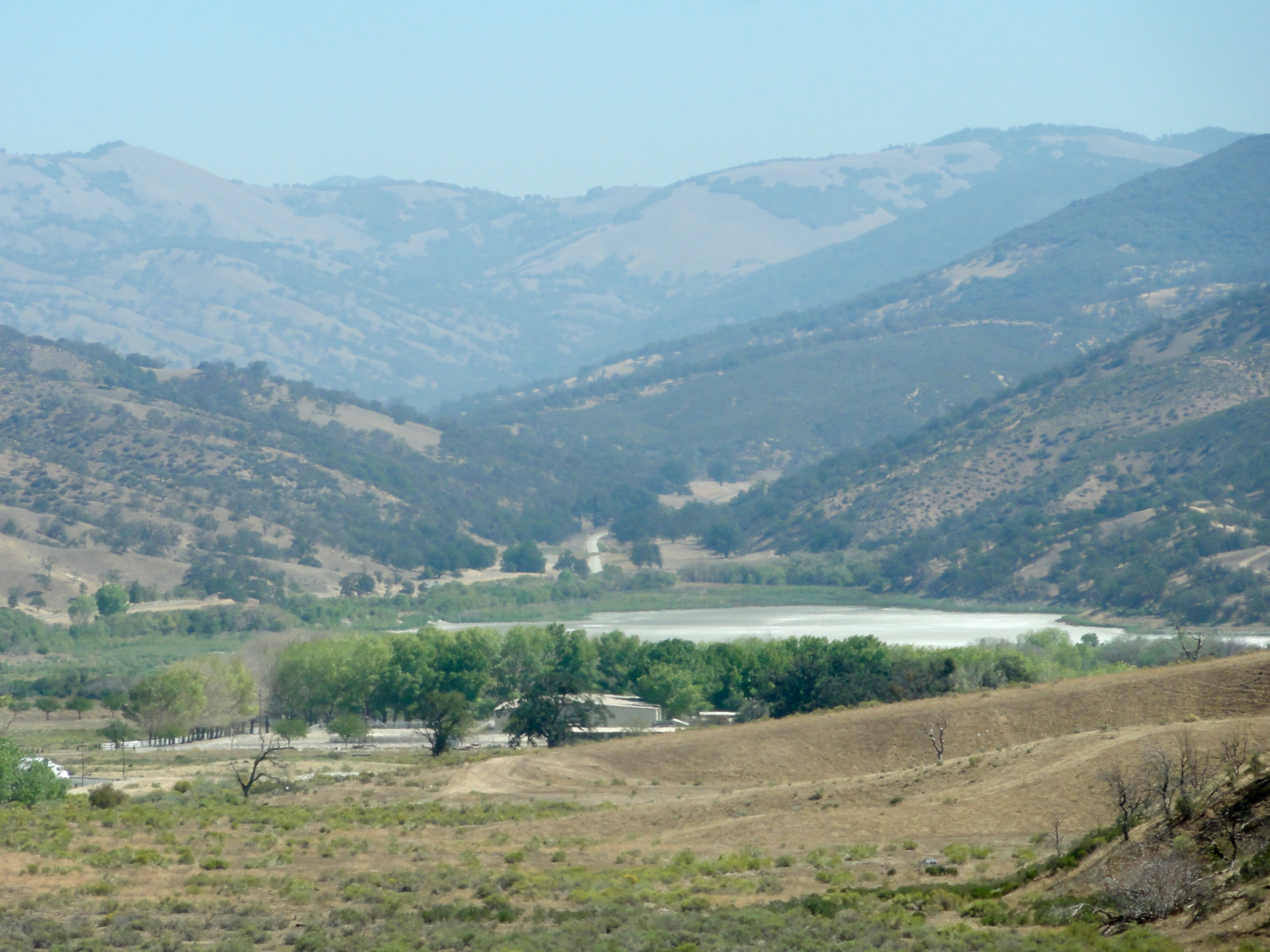
- Castac Lake is visible from I-5.

- Location within California Location within the United States
- Location: Lebec, Kern County, California
- Coordinates: 34.8349730°N 118.8431683°W
- Type: saline, endorheic (sink)
- Primary inflows: Cuddy Creek, Bear Canyon, Crane Canyon
- Primary outflows: Grapevine Creek
- Catchment area: 56 mi^{2} (150 km^{2})
- Max. length: 1 mile (1.6 km)
- Surface area: 400 acres (160 ha)
- Surface elevation: 3,484 ft (1,062 m)

Castac Lake (Chumash: Kaštiq), also known as Tejon Lake, is a natural saline endorheic, or sink, lake near Lebec, California. The lake is located in the Tehachapi Mountains just south of the Grapevine section of Interstate 5, and within Tejon Ranch. Normal water elevations are 3,482 feet (1,061 m) above sea level.

== Geography and geology ==
The lake lies in a natural sink at the eastern end of the Castac Valley, a rift valley formed along the Garlock Fault. The main inflows are Cuddy Creek and small intermittent streams originating in Bear and Crane Canyons, draining a total of 56 square miles (150 km^{2}) into the lake. The lake was formed about 10,000 years ago, by the natural damming of water behind the alluvial fan of Cuddy Creek, blocking its natural northern outlet to Grapevine Creek. During most years the outlet lies about 12 feet (3.7 m) higher than the lake surface. During rare flooding events, the lake does overflow into Grapevine Creek, which flows through a canyon into the San Joaquin Valley.

== History ==
Although Castac Lake itself is saline, or salty, the abundance of freshwater springs nearby made it an attractive area for human settlement. The lake area was once the territory of the Castac and Emigdiano groups of Chumash people, who occupied the area between Tejon Pass and the modern Grapevine. Several Native American villages were located in the area, including the Emigdiano village of Sasau on the northern shore of the lake. The Chumash name for the lake was Kash-tük, or "my eyes". The lake was known as A-uva-pya, or "in his eyes", in Kitanemuk, and as Sasa-u, "at the eye", in Yokuts.

The lake was first seen by Spanish explorer Pedro Fages who in 1772 led the first European expedition to cross the Tehachapis via Tejon Pass into the San Joaquin Valley. Fages named the lake Salinas de Cortes and Tejon Pass the Portezuelo de Cortes. The lake's modern name may have originated from a later Spanish expedition circa 1806, in which Father José María de Zalvidea noted a Native American village called "Casteque" or "Kashtiq" near "[a lake of] pure salt water".

In 1843 the lake was incorporated in a land grant which formed 22,178-acre (8,975 ha) Rancho Castac. In 1854, Fort Tejon was founded in the Grapevine Valley about 5 miles (8.0 km) northwest of the lake, to command the main route (via Tejon Pass) between the Central Valley and Southern California. The Rancho Castac was eventually acquired by Edward Fitzgerald Beale, who founded Tejon Ranch (at one point the largest private landholding in California).

During the late 19th and early 20th centuries the lakebed was occasionally mined for salt, as it tends to evaporate after extended periods of drought. According to historical records the lake was full through most of the 1940s, and dry in the early 1950s and early 1980s. During the mid-1990s, especially after the El Niño episode in 1997, the lake filled to overflowing.

Since 2001 the lake level has been artificially maintained by Tejon Ranch via pumping of groundwater in the Castac Valley area, though dropping well water levels have caused controversy over this practice. The higher lake levels have also increased the risk of overflow and flooding in Grapevine Valley, most recently in 2005.

== Water quality ==
Due to the local geology, Castac Lake contains naturally elevated levels of arsenic, boron, selenium, and aluminum, which concentrate during drought conditions and are flushed out in occasional floods. The lake meets most water quality objectives, but at times has an excess of coliform bacteria.

== See also ==
- List of lakes of California
