= Tejon Hills =

- Location within California Location within the United States

Highest point
- Elevation: 1,194 ft (364 m)

Geography
- Country: United States
- State: California
- District: Kern County
- Range coordinates: 35°5′30.877″N 118°47′13.345″W
- Topo map: USGS Tejon Hills

The Tejon Hills are a low mountain range in the Transverse Ranges, in southern Kern County, California. The highest point of the hills is Comanche Mountain, at 364 feet (111 m) in elevation.

They are completely within property owned by the Tejon Ranch corporation. A conservation easement is currently managed by the Tejon Ranch Conservancy.

== Geography ==
The Tejon Hills run below the western face of the Tehachapi Mountains, along the edge of the San Joaquin Valley. They are approximately 20 miles (32 km) west of the town of Tehachapi, south of Arvin, and east of Wheeler Ridge, Interstate 5, and U.S. Route 99.

== Natural history ==
They are formed of uplifted marine sediment deposits, unlike the adjacent Tehachapi Mountains of igneous materials related to the Sierra Nevada on the north.

The soil has a predominant alkaline ph, and supports several locally endemic plant species.
