= Quail Lake (California) =

Artificial lake in Los Angeles County, California

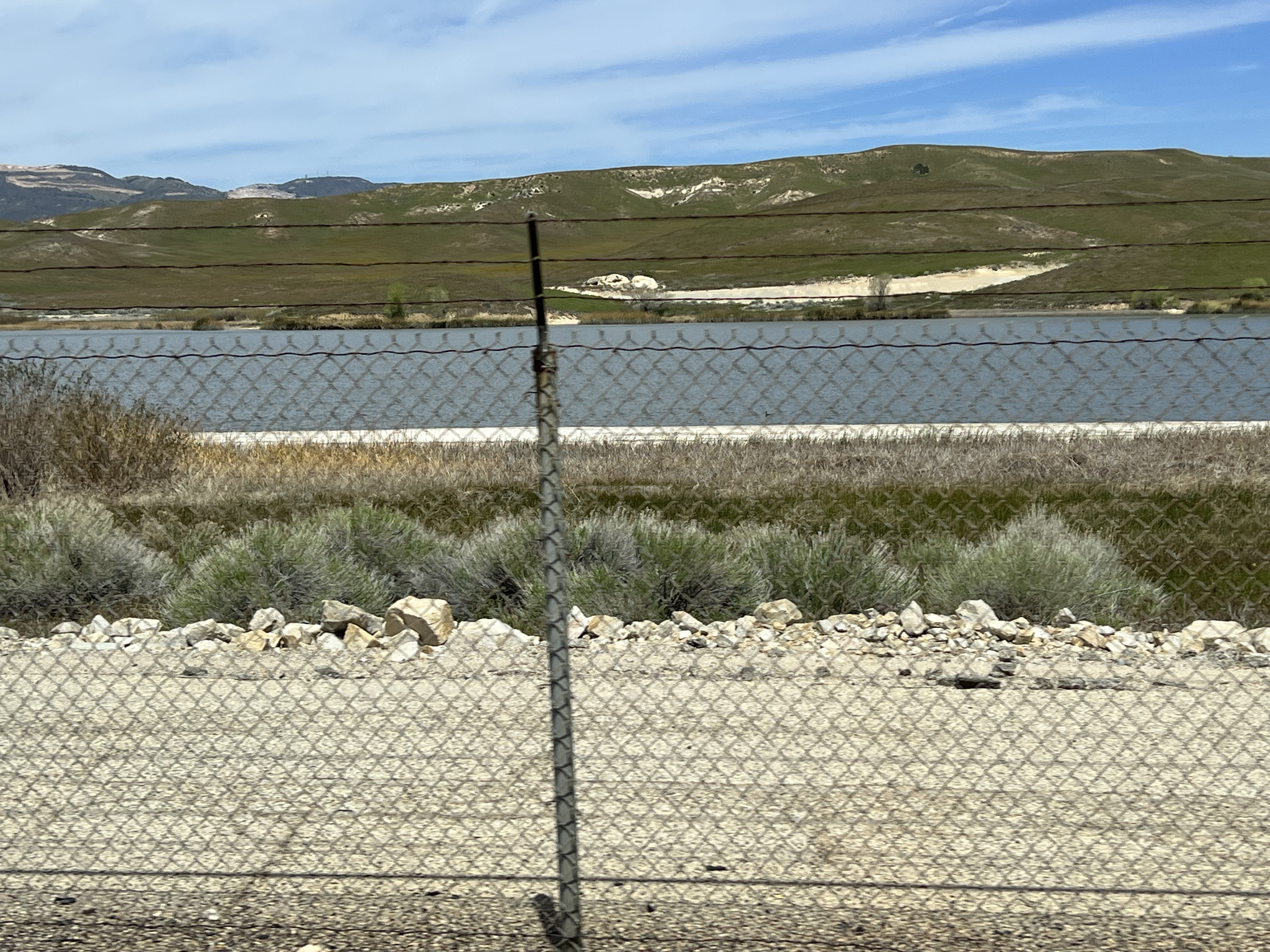
- Lake, full, in April 2023

- Location within the Los Angeles metropolitan area Location within California Location within the United States
- Location: Tejon Ranch; Los Angeles County, California
- Coordinates: 34°46′21″N 118°44′46″W
- Lake type: Reservoir
- Primary inflows: West Branch California Aqueduct
- Primary outflows: West Branch California Aqueduct
- Max. length: 2 km (1.2 mi)
- Max. width: 1 km (0.62 mi)
- Surface area: 100 ha (250 acres)
- Water volume: 5,654 acre⋅ft (6,974,000 m^{3})
- Shore length^{1}: 5 km (3.1 mi)
- Surface elevation: 1,017 m (3,337 ft)
- References: U.S. Geological Survey Geographic Names Information System: Quail Lake (California)
- ^{1} Shore length is not a well-defined measure.

Quail Lake in California is an artificial lake in Los Angeles County, California. Situated in the San Andreas Rift Zone, along the north side of State Route 138, it is a regulatory storage body for the West Branch California Aqueduct. The community of Centennial is a proposed 12,323-acre (49.87 km^{2}) master-planned community that will be built on a portion of Tejon Ranch to the northeast of the lake.

== See also ==
- List of lakes in California
