= Gorman, California =

Unincorporated community in California, United States

- Unincorporated community
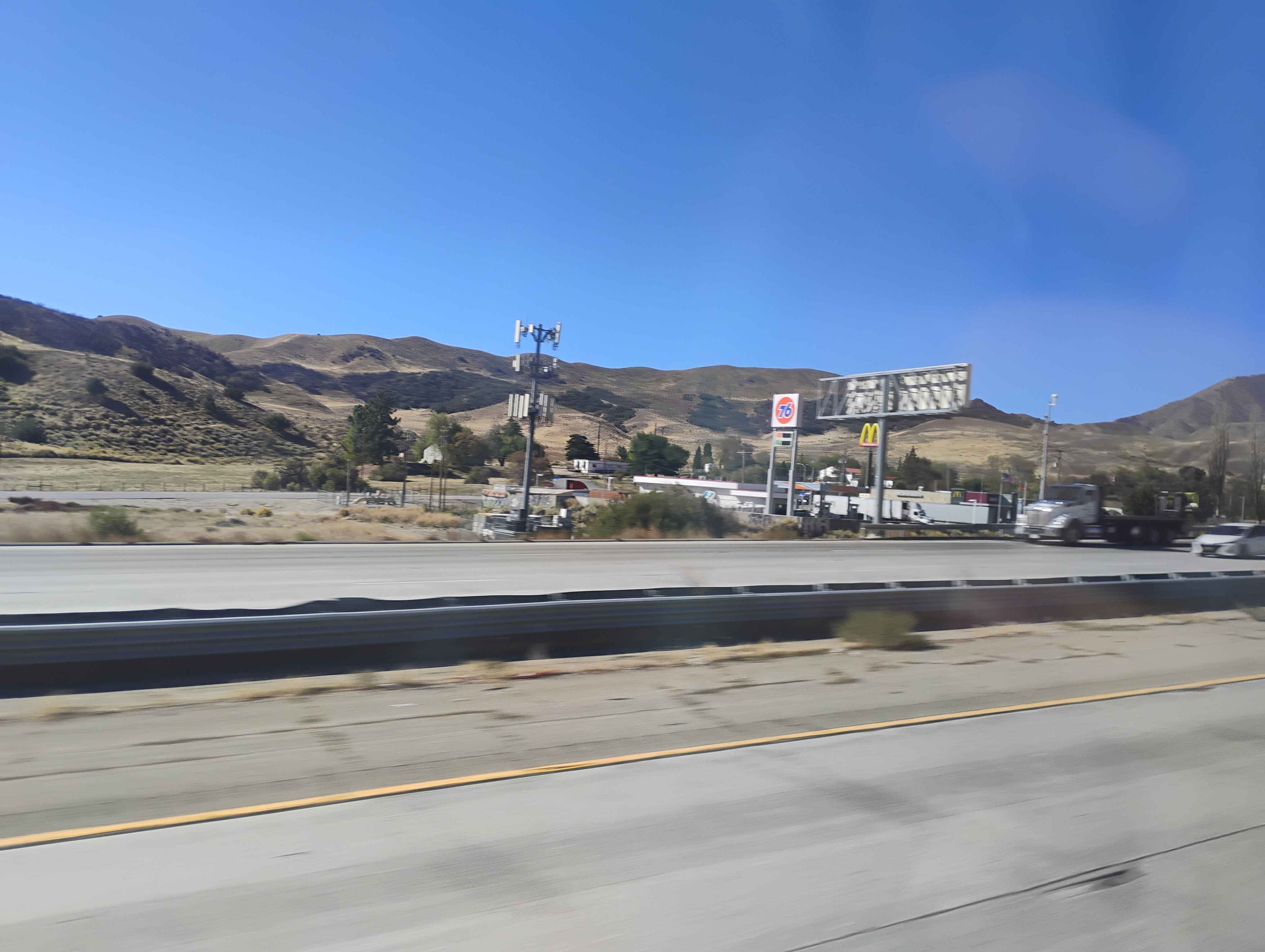
- Gorman, California, in 2025.

- Location of Gorman in Los Angeles County, California

- Location of Gorman in Los Angeles County, California Location of Gorman in California Location of Gorman in the USA
- Coordinates: 34.79611°N 118.85167°W
- Country: United States
- State: California
- County: Los Angeles

Area
  - Total: 2.390625 sq mi (6.19169 km^{2})
- Elevation: 3,829 ft (1,167 m)
- Time zone: UTC-8 (Pacific)
  - Summer (DST): UTC-7 (Pacific Daylight Time)
- ZIP code: 93243
- Area code: 661

Gorman is an unincorporated community in northwestern Los Angeles County, California, United States. It is located in Peace Valley, south of the Tejon Pass, which links Southern California with the San Joaquin Valley and Northern California. Due to this location, the area has served as a historic travel stop dating back to the indigenous peoples of California. Tens of thousands of motorists travel through Gorman daily on the Golden State Freeway (Interstate 5) since the highway's completion in the mid-20th century.

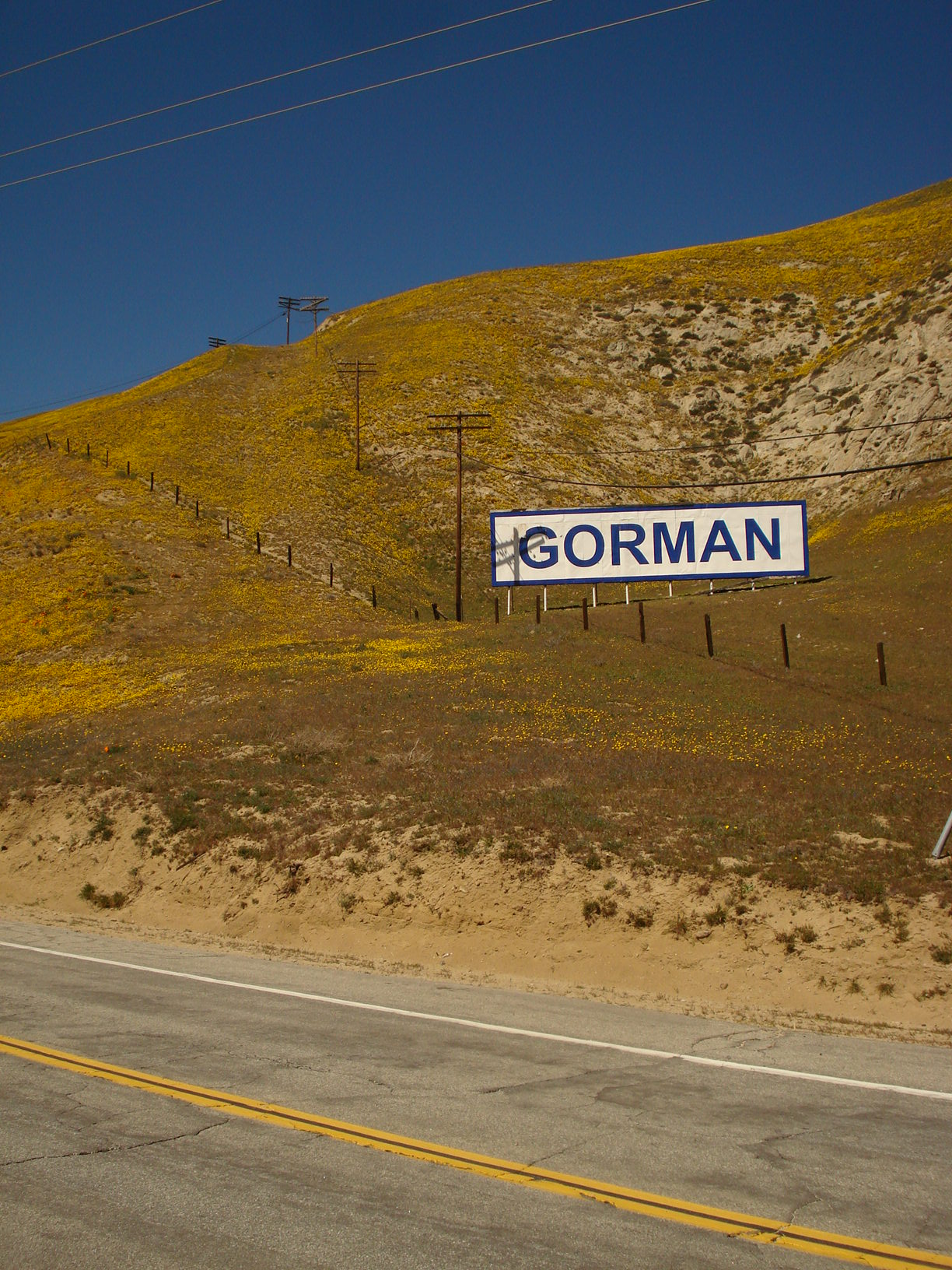
Gorman sign.

== Geography ==
Gorman is 1,530 acres (620 ha) in size. It lies where three Transverse System mountain ranges meet, namely the Sierra Pelona Mountains, the Tehachapi Mountains, and the San Emigdio Mountains.

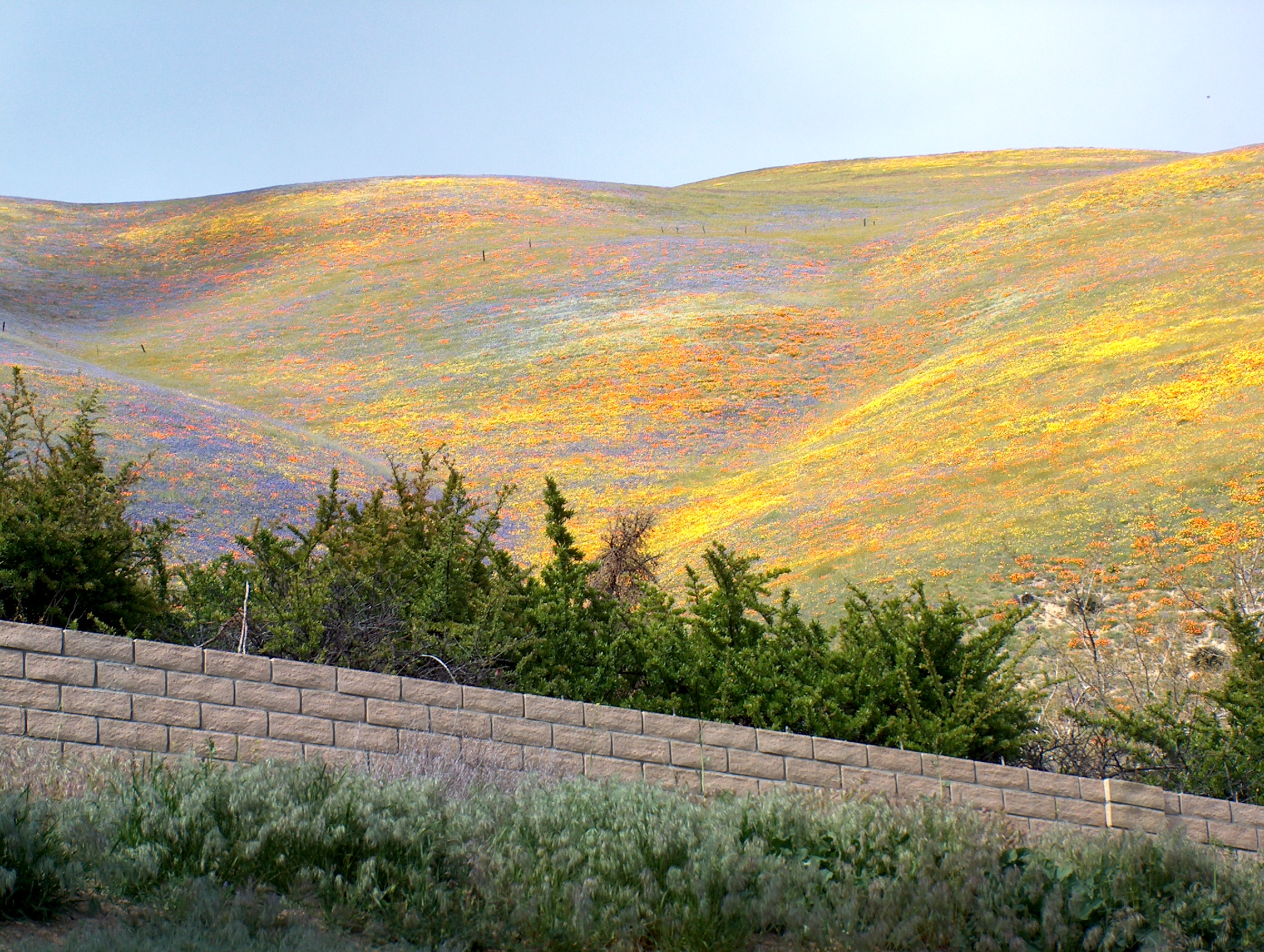
Wildflowers near Gorman

One of the Mountain Communities of the Tejon Pass, it is southeast of Frazier Park and south of Lebec. Interstate 5 runs through Gorman, and State Route 138 connects to the freeway a few miles south.

California poppies, lupines, and other wildflowers dramatically cover the hills in the springtime when there is sufficient rain.

Gorman is near the intersection of the two largest fault systems in California: the San Andreas Fault which slices directly through Gorman in a southeast–northwest direction, and the Garlock Fault which intersects the San Andreas about 3 miles (5 km) WNW of the town and travels approximately 160 miles (250 km) northeast along the Tehachapi Mountains to the Avawatz Mountains in the Mojave Desert.

== Population ==
The U.S. Census Bureau does not break out separate population figures for this small place, but in 2005 Gorman had only 15 homes and approximately a dozen registered voters.

== History ==
=== 18th century ===
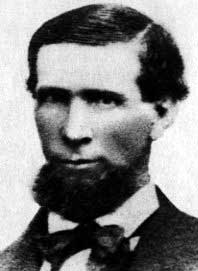
James Gorman Sr. gave his name to the rest stop in the Tejon Pass.

Gorman is "one of the oldest continuously used trail and roadside rest stops in California," as the Native Americans of California "would have stopped there when it was the Tataviam village of Kulshra'jek" explains Mountain Communities historian Bonnie Ketterl Kane.

The Spanish and Mexican colonial El Camino Viejo passed through the area en route to Old Tejon Pass. The route of the Stockton–Los Angeles Road went through Tejon Pass after 1852.

=== 19th century ===
The Gorman area was part of Rancho Los Álamos y Agua Caliente, an 1846 Mexican land grant.

The first American settler in the area was a man named Charles Johnson, after 1853. The 1853 account of Lt. Robert S. Williamson of the vicinity for the transcontinental railroad survey expedition report makes no mention of any habitations on the east side of the pass, only that a good wagon road (Stockton–Los Angeles Road) passed through it.

After Johnson's death, his widow, Soledad Girado ran the place, which by 1855 had become known as Rancho la Viuda (Widow's Station). Historian Frank F. Latta noted that the Johnsons' daughter, Isabel, was the only girl to study at the historic Escuela Normal of Los Angeles in the 1860s.

==== Reed's Station ====
A man named Reed took up residence next, calling it Reed's Ranch. In 1857 a woman was killed on his ranch when the great Fort Tejon earthquake struck the area and collapsed the roof of his adobe house.

Reed then built a substantial log house, which became Reed's Station, on the Butterfield Overland Mail 1st Division Stations in 1858. A stop for the postal stagecoach, it was located 8 miles southeast of Fort Tejon and 14 miles west of French John's Station.

The Butterfield Overland Mail ceased in 1861, but was replaced later by the Telegraph Stage Line, which stopped at most of the former stations, including at renamed Gorman's, where the horses were changed. Six of them were used for the pull up Tejon Pass from Bakersfield to Gorman's.

==== Gorman ====
It was next bought by David W. Alexander, the sheriff of Los Angeles County, who sold the place to James Gorman Sr. in 1867 or 1868. The log "public house", which furnished food, lodgings, and liquor, soon became known as Gorman's Station a.k.a. Gorman Station. James Gorman was reportedly at Fort Tejon as a civilian teamster and herder in 1854 while it was being built. On May 7, 1873, Gorman died on the ride home from Los Angeles after he fell out of his supply wagon and was run over by its own wheels.

The first post office at Gorman Station was established sometime between December 1, 1877, and March 1, 1878, with Mary E. Wilson – likely James Gorman's sister-in-law – as postmaster. Henry Gorman, James's son, was appointed postmaster in January 1887; Edward Gorman, another son, took over the position in September 1893. (The community today is served by a contract postal unit in the local market, but delivery is through the Lebec post office.) James Gorman's widow, Johanna, continued to run the family farm and the roadside rest until she died in 1889.

In or around 1898, the ranch was bought by Oscar Ralphs, whose brother, George, had already begun a business in Los Angeles (in 1872) that eventually became the Ralphs supermarket chain.

=== 20th century ===
They pioneered country stations when they put this one in.

— Lloyd Ralphs, commenting on the first gas station built on the Ridge Route, in 1923.

In 1901, Oscar Ralphs married Mary McKenzie, who, as Mary Ralphs, later served 57 years on the Gorman School Board (from 1908 to 1965) and was honored for her service by Vice President Hubert Humphrey at a National School Boards Association convention.

The 1950 movie "Hi-Jacked" featured location footage shot in Gorman.

The 1960 movie Psycho also briefly featured footage filmed in the township.

Ridge Route

The Ridge Route road through Gorman was paved in 1919. In 1923, the first gasoline station in California to be located away from a railroad track was established by Standard Oil. Gorman was a stop on the Ridge Route, and Highway 99 after 1926, where its Standard service station beckoned travelers. It was a rest stop for the Greyhound bus until 1977, and for long-distance truckers.

"Being located on the busiest highway in California," wrote historian Kane, "the people of Gorman knew well the need for an ambulance, as so many of the injured were brought to their homes. An ambulance service was established in 1932 with the purchase of an old Packard automobile that was converted into an emergency unit, equipped with one stretcher. The ambulance could be reached through the switchboard at the motel, and whoever was available would drive it."

Aviator Charles Lindbergh established a camp in 1930 on the northeast side of the Gorman Hills, where he tested and flew a folded-wing glider called the Albatross.

Interstate 5

Interstate 5 replaced U.S. Route 99 through Gorman and over Tejon Pass in 1964.

The Umbrellas

"The Umbrellas," a site-specific art installation by Christo and Jeanne-Claude, surrounded Gorman and Tejon Pass in late September and early October 1991. It was created with 1,760 large yellow umbrellas, placed from the roadsides to the mountainsides. A simultaneous installation of blue umbrellas was created in Japan. Thousands of visitors flocked to Gorman from all over the world.

=== 21st century ===
In January 2006, the Los Angeles County Board of Supervisors unanimously rejected a bid by 32 of the area's 75 property owners to give up Gorman so it could be annexed to Kern County. Reasons cited for the proposal included red tape and zoning regulations restricting development in Los Angeles County. However, Los Angeles County and opponents of the proposal did not want to lose sales- and occupancy-tax revenue the county collected annually from Gorman businesses.

On June 15, 2024, a wildfire known as the Post Fire broke out in Gorman. It quickly burned 22 square miles of land near the Interstate 5 freeway. More than a thousand firefighters were assigned to battle the blaze, particularly near the Pyramid Lake recreation area. The fire was 100% contained on Wednesday, June 26, after burning for 11 days. The cause is under investigation.

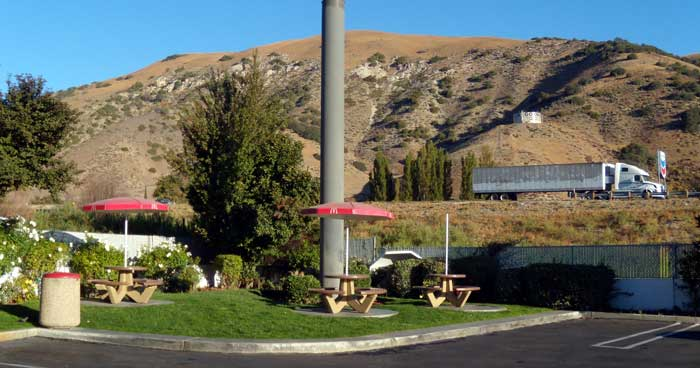
Gorman in 2008.

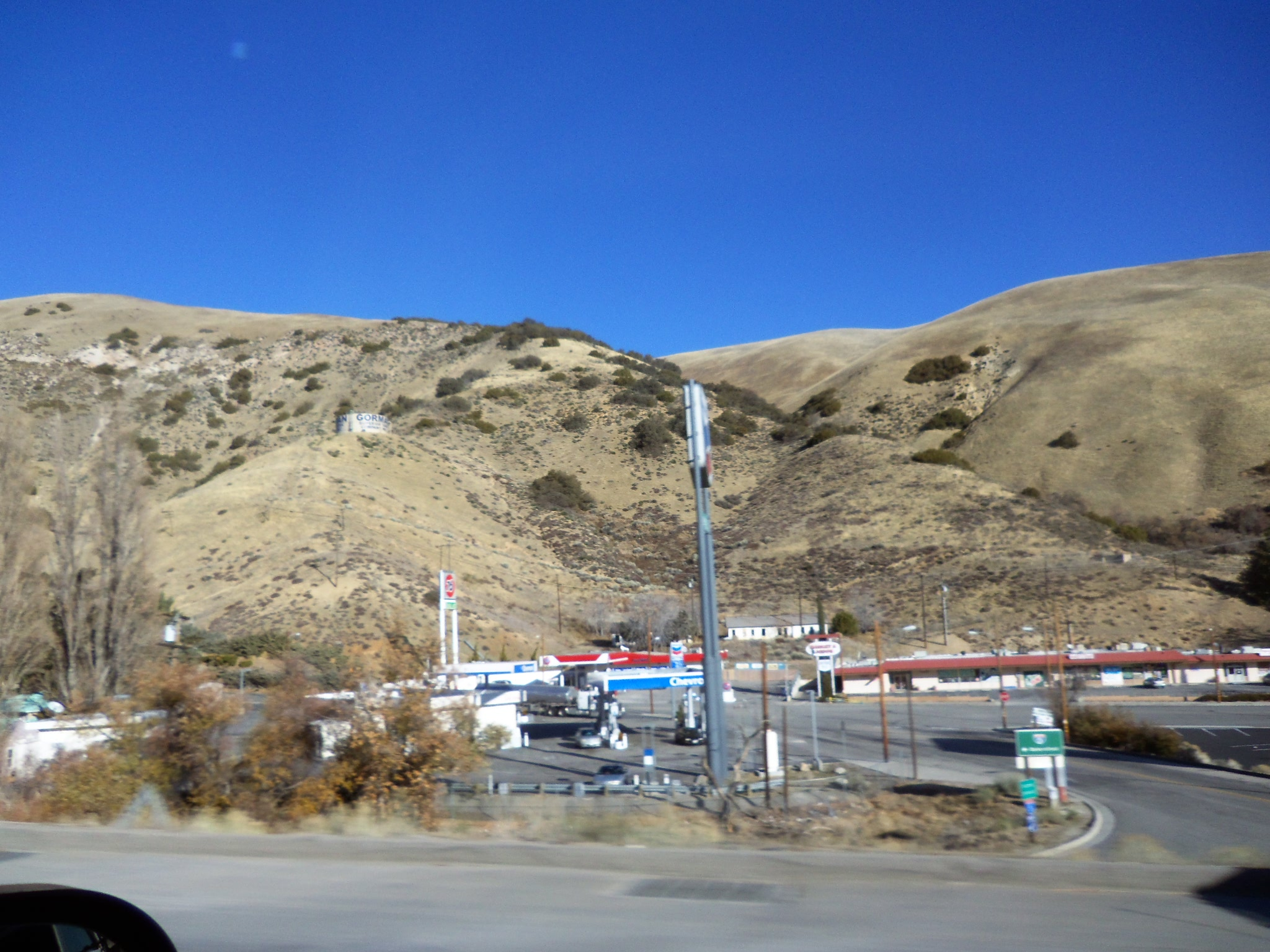
Gorman, California in 2011.

== Government and infrastructure ==
The Los Angeles County Sheriff's Department (LASD) operates a resident deputy program in Gorman staffed by two deputies. Oversight of the Gorman substation is provided by the Santa Clarita Valley Station in Santa Clarita. Deputy Sheriff Arthur E. Pelino, the then resident deputy of Gorman, was shot and killed at his Gorman office with his own firearm by a suspect he was processing in 1978. The County of Los Angeles sends a bookmobile to Gorman every Tuesday.

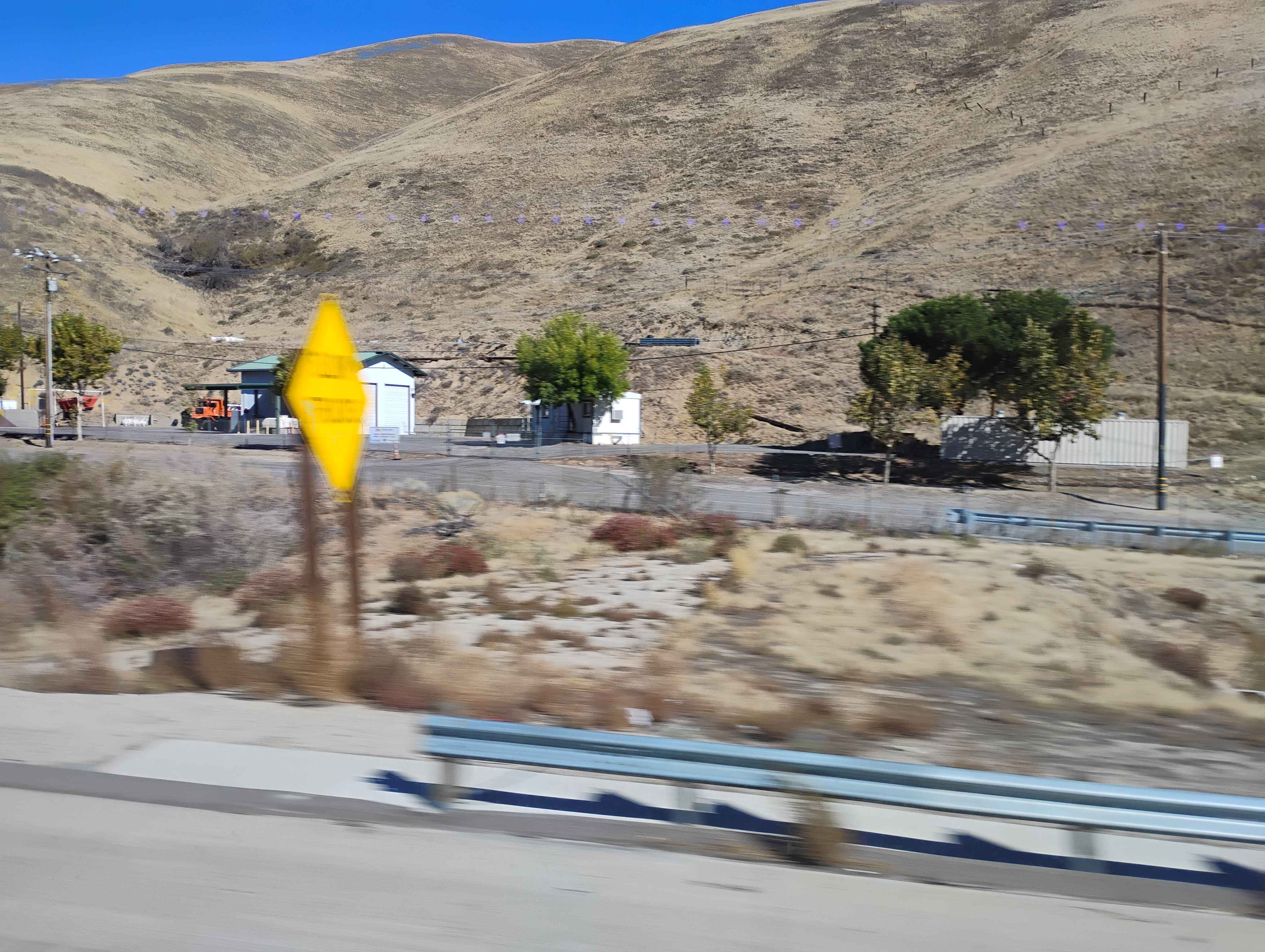
A small paved lot in Gorman, CA.

== Education ==
Gorman Joint School District

Other information
- Website: gorman.k12.ca.us

=== Gorman Joint School District ===
==== Gorman Elementary School ====
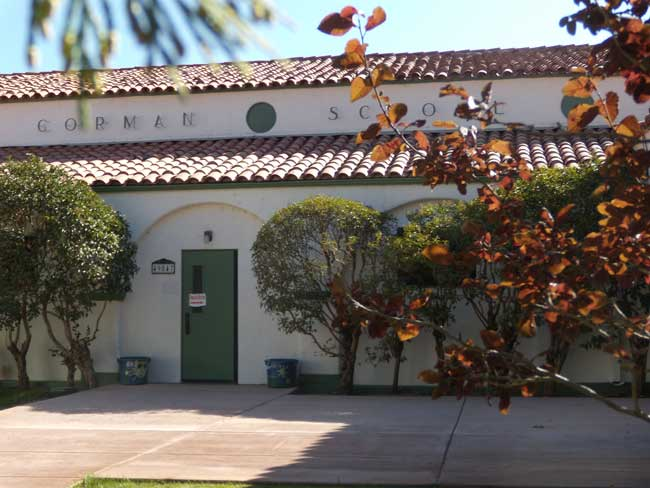
Gorman Elementary School, shown here in 2008, has two classrooms.

Accounts differ as to the origin of Gorman Elementary School, although the pioneer Ralphs family certainly played a role in its founding. According to researcher Harrison Irving Scott, the first school in the area appears to have been the one-room Manzana School, a mile south of Gorman, where in 1925 there were only four pupils — the Ralphs brothers, Glenn, Harry, Albert and Dewey. After it was torn down, the children went to Quail Lake School in another one-room schoolhouse. Gorman Elementary School was built by the federal government's Works Progress Administration in 1939. There is no accessible record of the first teacher, but Martha Forth was the second; she taught in 1941–1943. In 2009, Ruth Ralphs confirmed that the first teacher lived with her grandparents, Oscar and Mary Ralphs, but she couldn't remember the teacher's name. John "Glenn" Ralphs confirmed her identity as Mary "May" Barto Mertz. Ms. Mertz taught school in the Ralph's family living room, and continued for a time after the school was relocated (see below). She remained a friend of the family after she left to be married, and would visit Gorman, taking her son, George Dale Beasley with her.

Esther Pereira wrote in the Mountain Enterprise, however, that the Ralphs family "founded the school originally as the Quail Lake District. Classes were held in the Ralphs' family living room. The school was relocated to its present site and built on land donated by the Ralphs family, where it became known as the Gorman School District."

In 1990 Gorman had the smallest school district, and the smallest school in Los Angeles County, with just three classrooms, each with combined grades.

==== Threats to the district's existence ====
I'd stand on my head in the middle of Interstate 5 to save this school.

— Cecilia DeFazio, reading aide, cook, and bus driver at Gorman School.

Gorman School District is the smallest in Los Angeles County, and over the years it has faced threats to its existence. In 1971 it was saved when the state Legislature narrowly defeated a measure that would have done away with school districts with fewer than 50 pupils. Attendance in Gorman School dropped to 32 pupils, and townspeople hustled to "borrow" 11 children from elsewhere in order to keep up the enrollment.

"Everybody in town immediately panicked," District Superintendent Lacy H. Ballagh said. "We knew that if the bill passed, our children would probably be sent to the Quartz Hill School District on the outskirts of Lancaster and almost 50 miles (80 km) away."

In November 1978 the district was threatened when funding was curbed by the passage that year of California Proposition 13, placing a limit on the rate at which property taxes could be raised. Reduced salaries and other cost-cutting measures saved the district at that time.

By fall 2008, there was only one child from Gorman attending the elementary school; 40 came from the El Tejon Unified School District and one was from Neenach in the Westside Union School District. The Los Angeles County Office of Education had warned a year earlier that the district might be dissolved if it did not find a way to solve its problems.

But a land developer, Centennial Founders, in the meantime stepped forth with the desire to save the school district until it could build a proposed 23,000-house planned city east of Interstate 5 on Tejon Ranch property along Highway 138. It agreed to pay for a consultant to help the district find ways to stay afloat financially until the houses could be built and new schools constructed and operated there by the Gorman district.

==== Enrollment ====
In September 2008, Gorman Joint School District had just one K-8 elementary school with an enrollment of 42 pupils, only one of whom lived in Gorman. The others were transfers from neighboring El Tejon Unified School District or Neenach in the Westside Union School District.

In December 2010 Superintendent and Principal Martin Schmidt said that the district was at that point entirely a "school of choice" which had more than doubled its enrollment to 98 pupils and increased its Academic Performance Score from 679 to 784, with 800 being the goal for achievement. The increase in enrollment brought twice as much money from the state as before. Johannis Andrews, the principal for the 2011–2012 academic year, said in August 2011 that attendance had increased to 101 pupils, with five teachers.

In order to bring in additional average-daily-attendance funds from the state, the district before 2008 took on responsibility for the Gorman Learning Center charter school in Redlands, 129 miles (208 km) away (Google map). The center had about 800 home-school pupils enrolled.

==== Ruth Ralphs ====
In January 2008, Ruth Ralphs was honored for 33 years of service to the Gorman School District. Ralphs was secretary-treasurer of James L. Ralphs Inc. and vice president of Tri-Foods, which owned Carl's Jr. in Gorman. A native of Townsville, Queensland, Australia, she died at the age of 90 on December 30, 2010.

"During many of those 33 years, Ruth also managed Ralphs' family enterprises (such as gas stations, motels, a cafe, grazing rights and an antenna) while serving as postmistress of the Gorman Post Office," the local newspaper, the Mountain Enterprise, reported.

=== High schools ===
The Gorman area is a part of the Antelope Valley Union High School District, but in 1996 just four of its 24 high school children traveled the 40 miles (64 km) to attend Quartz Hill High School in Lancaster, the closest high school in that district. The others attended nearby Frazier Mountain High School under special permits.

=== Community colleges ===
Gorman is part of the Antelope Valley Community College District, whose Antelope Valley College campus is 45.6 miles (73.4 km) away via Highway 138 and West Avenue I.

== Transportation ==
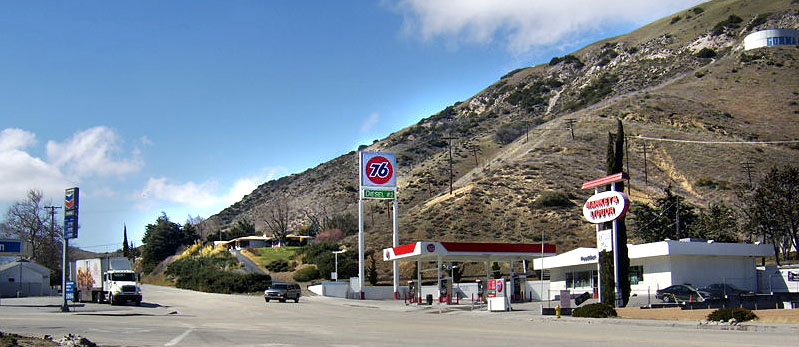
Gorman Post Road, looking north, on the east side of Interstate 5

Seventy-four thousand people pass through Gorman daily via the Interstate 5 freeway, but residents have a choice of local roads to avoid the freeway. Peace Valley Road parallels the freeway on the west, north of the town, for travel to Frazier Park and Lebec, and Gorman Post Road on the east, south of town, is a direct route to State Route 138.

Kern Transit provides bus service from Gorman to Lebec, Frazier Park, Lake of the Woods, Pinon Pines, and Pine Mountain Club. It offers a dial-a-ride service all year. Connections can be made in Frazier Park or Lebec to scheduled service to Grapevine, Santa Clarita, and Bakersfield and further connection there to Greyhound Lines and Amtrak.

== See also ==
- The Mountain Enterprise newspaper, which circulates in Gorman and the surrounding area.
- California Floristic Province.
