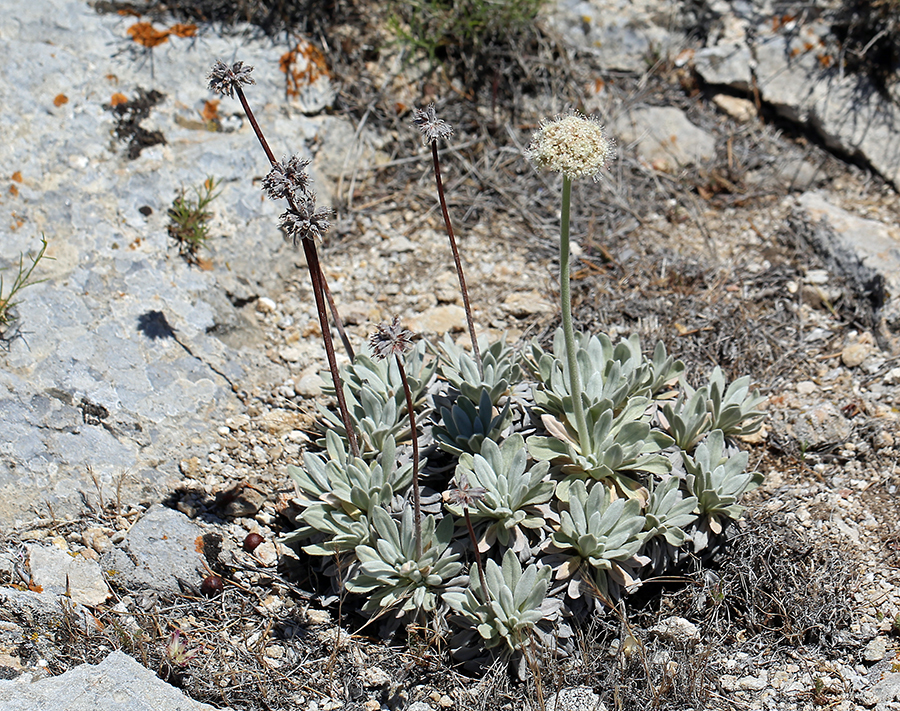

Conservation status
- Critically Imperiled (NatureServe)

Scientific classification
- Kingdom: Plantae
- Clade: Embryophytes
- Clade: Tracheophytes
- Clade: Angiosperms
- Clade: Eudicots
- Order: Caryophyllales
- Family: Polygonaceae
- Genus: Eriogonum
- Species: E. callistum

Binomial name
- Eriogonum callistum Reveal

= Eriogonum callistum =

Species of wild buckwheat

Eriogonum callistum is a rare species of wild buckwheat, known by the common name Tehachapi buckwheat.

== Description ==
Eriogonum callistum is a perennial herb forming a mat of woolly whitish green herbage on a woody base measuring up to 35 centimeters tall and up to 1 metre (3.3 ft) wide. It grows from a woody taproot and branching caudex. It is covered in rosettes of leaves each up to 5 centimetres (2.0 in) long by 2 centimetres (0.79 in) wide. The blades are coated densely in grayish white silky hairs.

The inflorescence arises on an erect stem up to 40 or 45 centimetres (16 or 18 in) tall which is whitish and hairy when new and turns reddish as it ages. The inflorescence itself is a cluster of up to 35 flowers a few centimeters wide. The woolly flowers are pink-tinged when in bud and turn bright white when open. The stamens are tipped with yellow or pink anthers.

Within genus Eriogonum this is the only species in the new section named Lanocephala in subgenus Eucycla.

== Taxonomy ==
The botanist James L. Reveal scientifically described this species in 2006 with the name Eriogonum callistum. It is part the Eriogonum withing the wider Polygonaceae family. It has no botanical synonyms.

== Distribution and habitat ==
The perennial herb is endemic to California, found only in the southwestern Tehachapi Mountains, in Kern County, Southern California. There are an estimated 2000 individuals in existence, in several sites on the eastern Tejon Ranch, between Castaic Lake and the Antelope Valley. It is found on the Tejon Ranch.

It grows in rocky limestone soils in chaparral habitat among manzanitas.

== Conservation ==
Eriogonum callistum is a Critically Imperiled endemic species in California, and is on the California Native Plant Society Inventory of Rare and Endangered Plants of California, listed as Seriously Endangered in California.
