= Hungry Valley =

Valley in Los Angeles County, California

- Valley
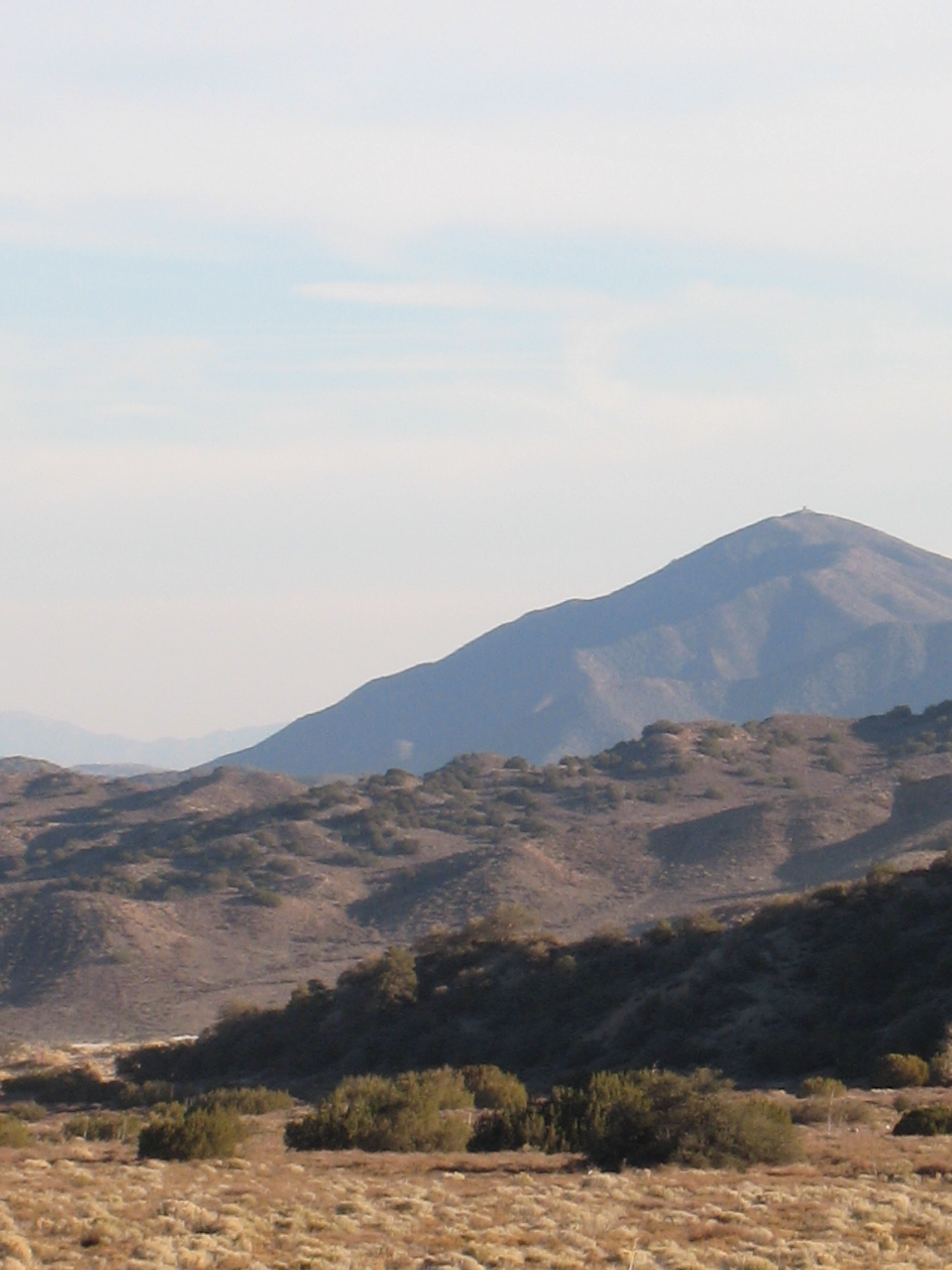

- Location within the Los Angeles metropolitan area Location within California
- Coordinates: 34°46′57″N 118°52′54″W
- Location: Los Angeles County and Ventura County, California
- Range: Transverse Ranges
- Website: parks.ca.gov/..

Hungry Valley is a valley located along the northern border of Los Angeles and Ventura counties, about 2 mi (3.2 km) southwest of Gorman, California. The valley is notable for being a popular destination for off-road vehicle enthusiasts across California.

== Geography ==
The valley is located within the Transverse Ranges of Southern California. The valley is located about 5 mi (8.0 km) east of Frazier Mountain and about 6.7 mi (10.8 km) northeast of Alamo Mountain. The Freeman Mountains are located immediately east of the valley, and constitute the majority of the state vehicular recreation area.

== Ecology ==
The valley is located at ecological transition zone between the semi-arid montane chaparral of the Transverse Ranges and the desert plant communities of the nearby Antelope Valley.

== Recreation ==
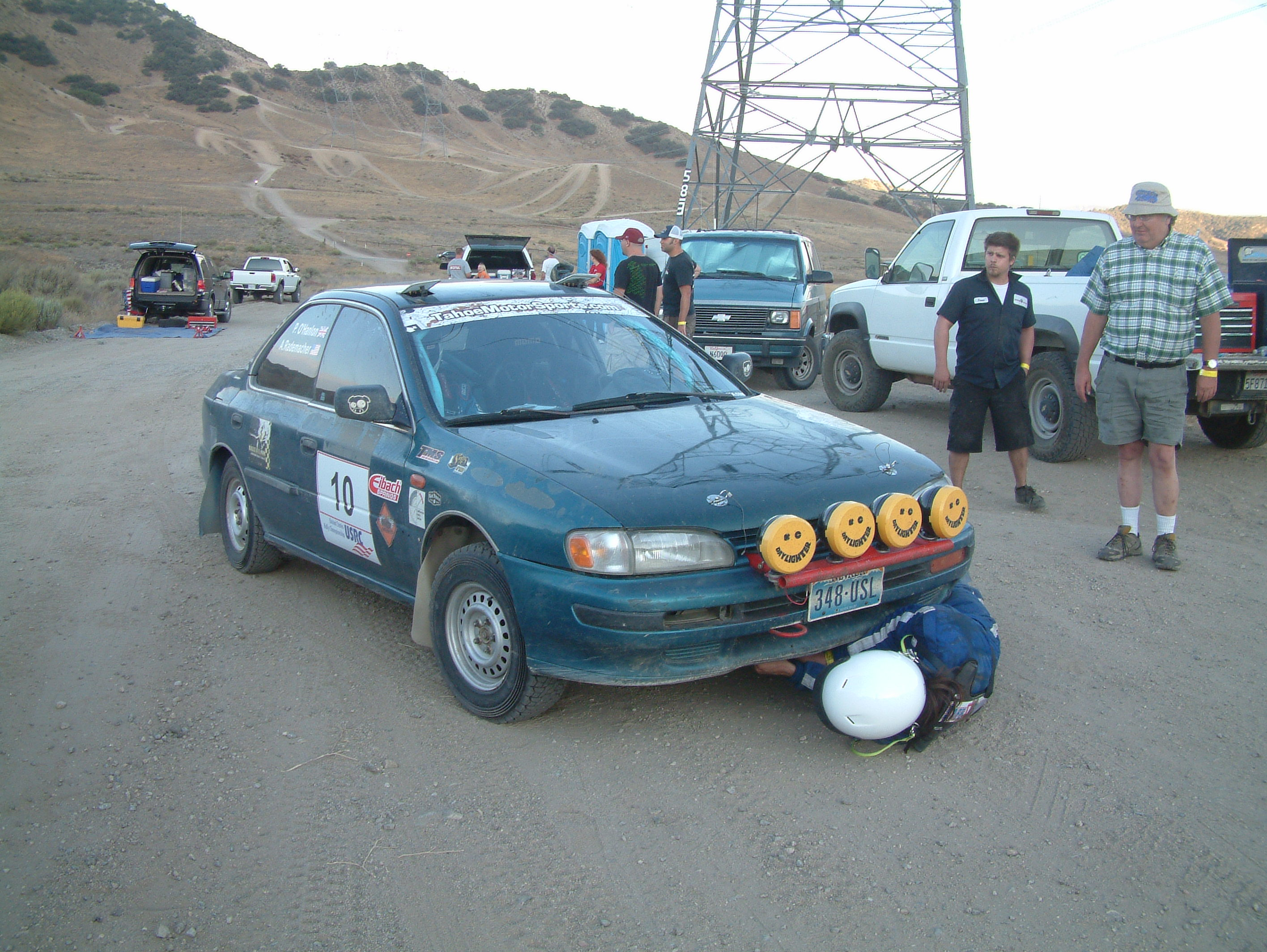
Servicing a modified Subaru Impreza in Hungry Valley SVRA, 2009

The Hungry Valley State Vehicular Recreation Area is an off-road vehicle recreation area administered by the California Department of Parks and Recreation. With over 130 mi (210 km) of marked off-road trails across over 19,000 acres (7,700 ha) of protected land, Hungry Valley SVRA is the second largest vehicular recreation area in California. The California Department of Parks and Recreation is tasked with the dual role of preserving the ecological integrity of the valley's chaparral plant communities while also managing the safe use of recreational vehicles in the area.

The valley includes a visitor center, public toilets, 11 campsites of varying sizes, and 6 off-road vehicle tracks for drivers of all skill levels and vehicle sizes. The valley is accessible via Gold Hill Road (paved) or Hungry Valley Road (dirt).

== See also ==
- Mountain Communities of the Tejon Pass
- Peace Valley
