= Cummings Mountain (California) =

Mountain in central California, US

- Location within California

Highest point
- Elevation: 7763+ feet (2366+ m) NAVD 88
- Prominence: 1,240 ft (378 m)
- Coordinates: 35°02′30″N 118°34′18″W

Geography
- Location: Kern County, California, U.S.
- Parent range: Tehachapi Mountains
- Topo map: USGS Cummings Mountain

Cummings Mountain is a mountain located in the Tehachapi Mountains of central California.

It is located near the town of Tehachapi and State Route 58.

Due to the peaks elevation snow falls on the summit during the winter months.
