= Centennial, California =

Proposed planned community in Los Angeles County

Coordinates: 34°46′45″N 118°41′45″W

Centennial is a proposed 12,323-acre (49.87 km^{2}) master-planned community on Tejon Ranch in northwestern Los Angeles County, California, United States, between Bakersfield and Los Angeles. It is situated in the far western Antelope Valley at the foothills of the Sierra Pelona and Tehachapi Mountains. It would be built along California State Route 138 east of Interstate 5 and northeast of Quail Lake.

== Project description ==
The community is intended to be built over 25 to 30 years, with approximately one-half of the 11,700-acre (4,700 ha) area designated as open space. It comprises 19,333 houses, including single- and multifamily structures. The Tejon Ranch Company has agreed to set aside 18% of housing as affordable housing. The developers have stated they plan to attract local jobs in order to employ the anticipated number of adult residents. The projected population is 57,000.

The project lies between a point about a mile east of the intersection of Interstate 5 and California Highway 138 eastward past Quail Lake into the western Antelope Valley to about 280th Street West. It is southeast of Gorman, west of Neenach.

The 19.3-square-mile project (50 km^{2}) is planned to be developed by four companies: Tejon Ranch Company, Lewis Operating Company, Pardee Homes and Standard Pacific Homes, on the property of Tejon Ranch.

The site is located in "high" and "very high" fire hazard severity zones as defined by the California Department of Forestry and Fire Protection. According to county planning documents, CalFire recorded "31 wildfires larger than 100 acres within five miles of Centennial, including four within the project’s boundaries" from 1964 to 2015. Developers state that the project is being designed to mitigate fire risk and will include four fire stations.

== Public reaction ==
Environmental groups have opposed the housing project, because it would be built on rare ecosystems, including the largest native grassland left in California, among other concerns. The project is planned on the territory inhabited by four federally endangered or threatened animals, including the critically endangered California condor, and 23 animals and plants listed by under the California Endangered Species Act. The Tejon Pass area also functions as a wildlife corridor connecting the Tehachapi Mountains, the Mojave Desert, the Sierra Nevada, and the Central Valley.

Another major concern was traffic congestion on Interstate 5 and Highway 138 as the development would be far from many jobs. Concerns also included an increase of valley fever caused by the release of dust-borne spores during construction, insufficient water supply, and "poorly designed" wildlife corridors.

== Legal actions ==
In 2008, an agreement was reached between developers and the Natural Resources Defense Council, the Audubon Society of California, the Sierra Club, the Endangered Habitats League, and the Planning and Conservation League. The agreement stated that 90% of Tejon Ranch would be protected if the conservation groups agreed not to oppose development on the remaining 10%. Erecting structures would be forbidden, but the ranch could continue to be used for "profitable agriculture, mining, grazing and exclusive commercial hunting operations." The development of Tejon Mountain Village is another community allowed under the agreement. Opponents of the agreement claimed that much of the land was too steep and remote to be buildable and that Tejon's biodiversity was protected under federal laws.

In April 2019, the largest of the most vocal environmental groups in opposition to the project, the Center for Biological Diversity and the California Native Plant Society, filed a suit against the County Board of Supervisors. The suit claimed the Board's approval of the Centennial project violated the California Environmental Quality Act and asked that development be halted until a new environmental review could be completed.

In April 2021, Superior Court Judge Mitchell Beckloff rejected the developer's environmental impact report, citing aspects concerning wildfire risk and additional greenhouse gases generated by vehicles. Tejon Ranch stated that any risk of wildfire "outside the project will be reduced to less than significant," but Beckloff wrote that the statement was not supported by analysis.

Tejon Ranch and the nonprofit Climate Resolve organization reached an agreement that the development would be designed specifically to combat global warming. The agreement includes the installation of nearly thirty thousand electric-vehicle chargers at residences and commercial businesses. The plan will include other incentives to support the purchase of 10,500 electric vehicles, school buses and trucks. The Los Angeles Times reported that:

The compromise also requires funding for fire protection and prevention measures, including fire-resilient planning and vegetation management strategies that would also benefit neighboring communities. It also directs the creation of an organization empowered to produce annual progress reports.

The parties also agreed that the development would include:

- Zero greenhouse gas emissions.
- Wildfire prevention by funding fire-protection and prevention measures.
- Transparency in public access to records, including forming an organization empowered to monitor progress on results and benefits.

== See also ==
- Mountain Communities of the Tejon Pass
- Newhall Ranch, California
