= Rancho La Liebre =

Land grant in California

Coordinates: 34.77507°N 118.67638°W

Rancho La Liebre was a 48,800-acre (197 km^{2}) Mexican land grant in present-day Kern County, California and Los Angeles County, given in 1846 by Governor Pío Pico to José María Flores. Liebre means "Hare" in Spanish and the rancho was named as such because of the abundance of jack rabbits in the area.

The rancho was mostly in the mountainous terrain of the Tehachapi Mountains and Sierra Pelona Mountains, in the northwest part of Los Angeles County, west of the Antelope Valley and Mojave Desert. The rancho is now a part of the 270,000 acres (1,093 km^{2}) Tejon Ranch.

== History ==
Flores was the commander and chief of the Mexican forces in California during the Mexican-American War.

With the cession of California to the United States following the Mexican-American War, the 1848 Treaty of Guadalupe Hidalgo provided that the land grants would be honored. As required by the Land Act of 1851, a claim for Rancho La Liebre was filed with the Public Land Commission in 1852. Flores nearly lost his entitlement to the rancho when the Public Land Commission declared the grant to be fraudulently obtained. The Land Commission contended that Pico back dated many of the land grants he issued and that Rancho La Liebre was granted while California was under American control and no longer a part of Mexico. However, Flores won an appeal and kept the title. The grant was patented to Jose Maria Flores in 1875.

In 1855 Edward Beale purchased Rancho La Liebre from Flores. It was the first of the four Mexican Land Grants (Rancho Los Alamos y Agua Caliente, Rancho El Tejon, and Rancho Castac) that Beale would acquire to create the present Tejon Ranch.

== Historic sites of the Rancho ==
La Casa del Rancho La Liebre is the adobe built by Edward F. Beale in the late 1850s in Bear Canyon (Canon de las Osas). By the time Beale acquired La Liebre, he had married Mary Edwards and had a son named Truxtun. The house was the administrative headquarters for the nearly 270,000 acres (1,093 km^{2})of ranch land that expanded over both Los Angeles and Kern Counties. It is a half mile south of State Route 138, approximately ten miles east of Interstate 5.

== See also ==
- Ranchos of California
- List of Ranchos of California
- List of rancho land grants in Los Angeles County, California
