= Peace Valley (California) =

Valley in Los Angeles County, California

- Valley
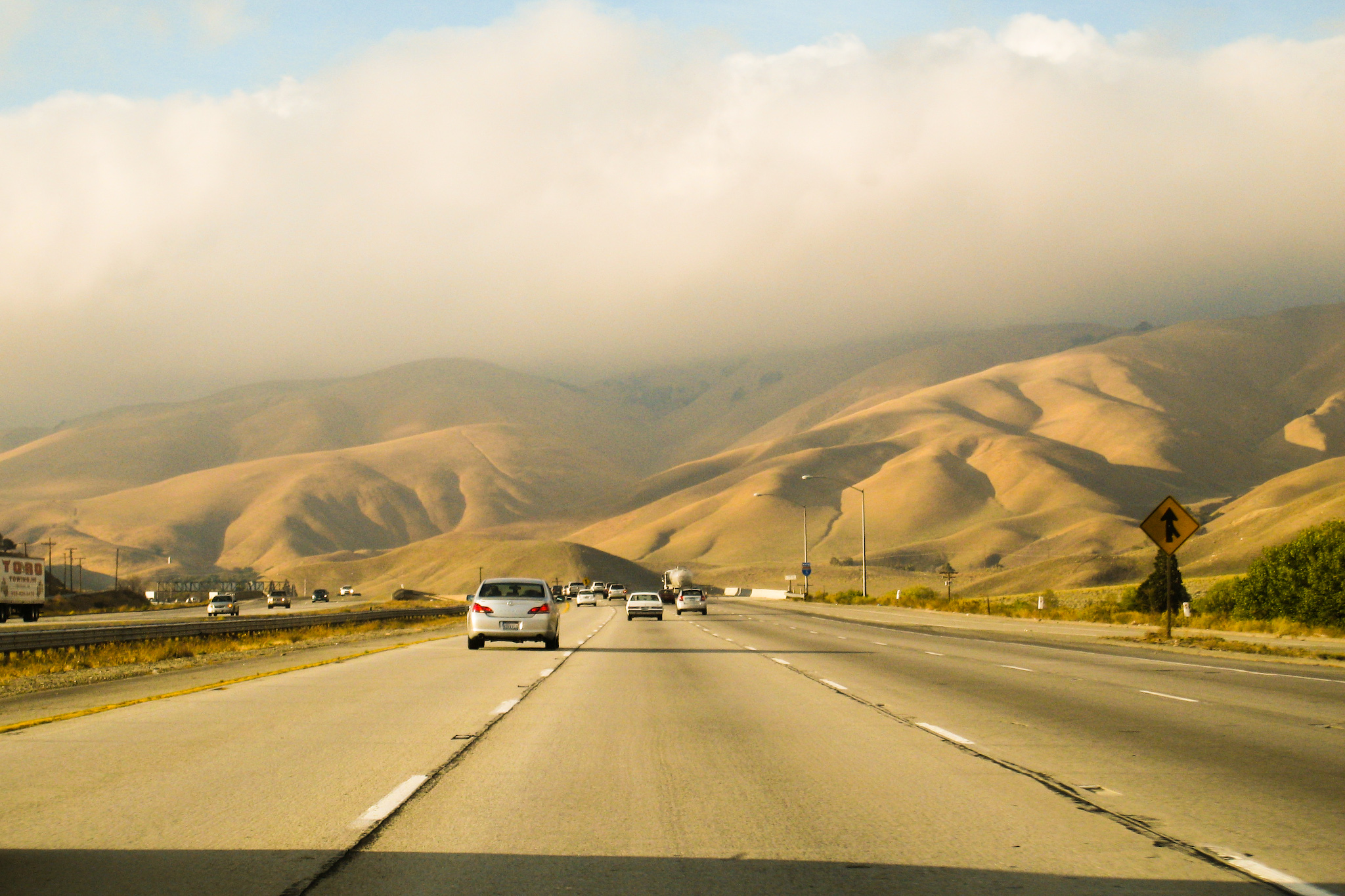
- Peace Valley, south of Gorman

- Location within the Los Angeles metropolitan area Location within California
- Coordinates: 34°47′52″N 118°52′17″W
- Location: Los Angeles County, California
- Range: Transverse Ranges

Peace Valley is a valley in the northwestern corner of Los Angeles County, California, running northeast−southeast along the San Andreas Fault and a section of Interstate 5 near Tejon Pass. The unincorporated community of Gorman is located within the valley.

== Geography ==
The valley is located between the foothills of the Tehachapi Mountains to the north, the San Emigdio Mountains to the west, and the Sierra Pelona to the southeast. Hungry Valley State Vehicle Recreation Area is located to the southwest and meets the valley at the north end of Coyote Canyon.

The tripoint between Kern, Los Angeles, and Ventura counties is located within the northwestern portion of the valley, at 34°47′28″N 118°52′55″W.

== Ecology ==
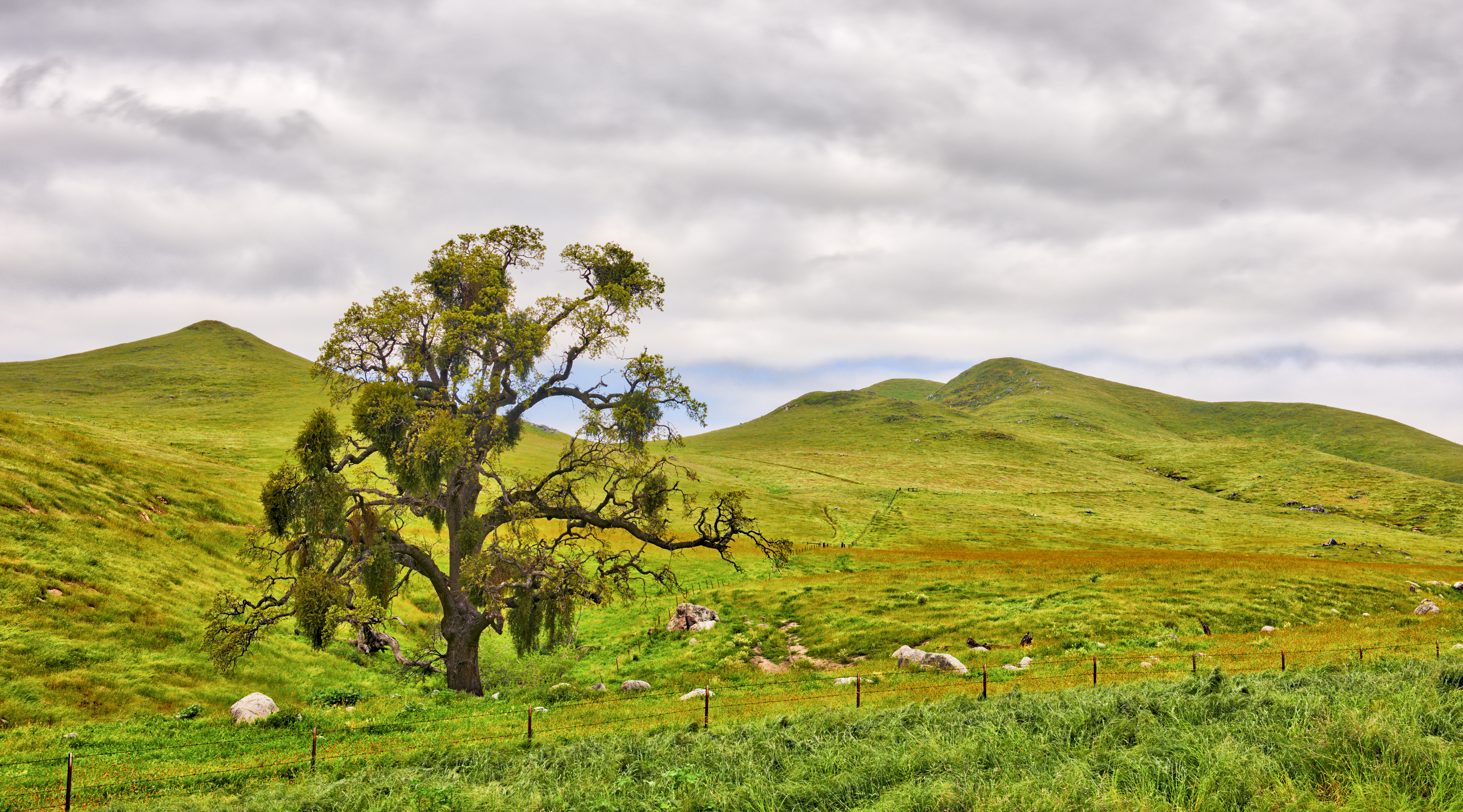
Coast live oak-sagebrush plant community in Peace Valley

The valley is located at ecological transition zone between the semi-arid montane chaparral of the Transverse Ranges and the desert plant communities of the nearby Antelope Valley.

== Transportation ==
Interstate 5 as it approaches Tejon Pass from the south passes through the entire length of the valley. The I-5 intersection with California State Route 138 is in its eastern section.

== See also ==
- Mountain Communities of the Tejon Pass
- Cuddy Canyon
- Hungry Valley
