= Rancho Castac =

Land grant in California

Coordinates: 34.84959°N 118.84658°W

Rancho Castac or Rancho Castec was a 22,178-acre (89.75 km^{2}) Mexican land grant in present-day Kern and Los Angeles counties, California, made by Governor Manuel Micheltorena to Jose Maria Covarrubias in 1843. The rancho in the Tehachapi Mountains lay between Castac Lake on the south and the present Grapevine on the north and included what is now the community of Lebec. The rancho is now a part of the Tejon Ranch.

The word Castac is derived from Kashtiq, the Chumash-language name that the Chumash people gave to the area nearby.

The title to Rancho Castac was granted by Governor Micheltorena in 1843 to schoolteacher and government official José María Covarrubias.

With the cession of California to the United States after the Mexican-American War, the 1848 Treaty of Guadalupe Hidalgo provided that existing land grants would be honored. As required by the Land Act of 1851, a claim for Rancho Castac was filed with the U.S. Public Land Commission in 1853, and the grant was patented to Covarrubias in 1866.

In 1860, Samuel A. Bishop purchased the rancho, and in 1864 he settled in Fort Tejon. Bishop sold the land to Robert Symington Baker, who in 1866 resold it to Edward Beale. The latter, who had been the Superintendent of Indian Affairs in California, later acquired three other Mexican land grants—(Rancho Los Alamos y Agua Caliente, Rancho El Tejon and Rancho La Liebre)—to create the present Tejon Ranch.

== See also ==
- 1857 Fort Tejon earthquake
- Mountain communities of the Tejon Pass
- Ranchos of California
- List of Ranchos of California
