= Fort Tejon =

Coordinates: 34.874000°N 118.89430°W

- U.S. National Register of Historic Places
- U.S. Historic district
- California Historical Landmark
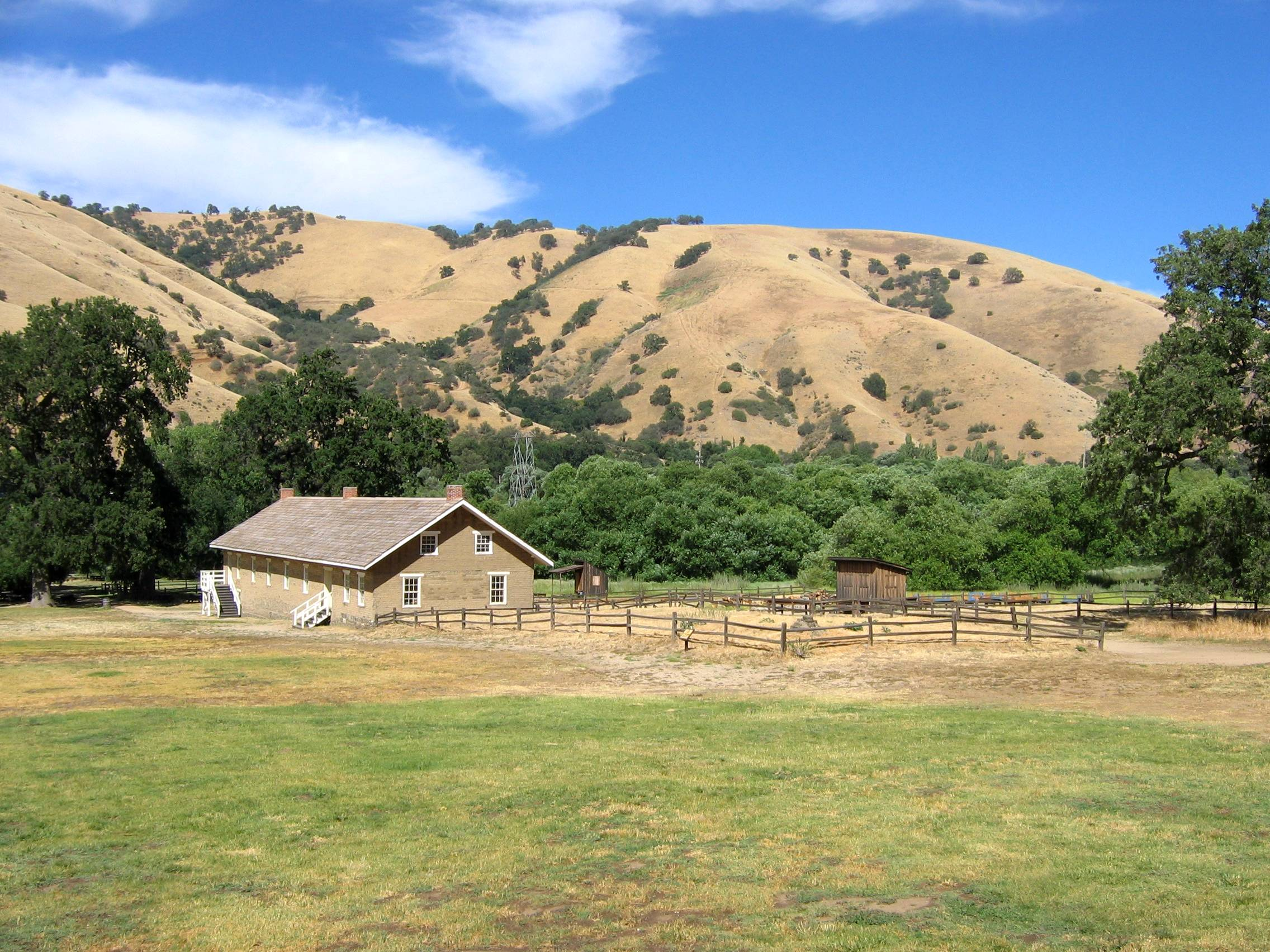
- Fort Tejon Barracks
- Interactive map of Fort Tejon
- Nearest city: Lebec, California
- Built: 1854
- NRHP reference No.: 71000140
- CHISL No.: 129

Significant dates
- Added to NRHP: 1971
- Designated CHISL: 1954

Fort Tejon in California is a former United States Army outpost which was intermittently active from June 24, 1854, until September 11, 1864. It is located in the Grapevine Canyon (La Cañada de las Uvas) between the San Emigdio Mountains and Tehachapi Mountains. It is in the area of the Tejon Pass along Interstate 5 in Kern County, California, the main route through the mountain ranges separating the Central Valley from the Los Angeles Basin and Southern California. The fort's location protected the San Joaquin Valley from the south and west.

== Purpose ==
The fort's mission was to suppress stock rustling and protect settlers from attacks by discontent Californios (pre-statehood residents) and Native American tribes (including the Paiute and Mojave), and to monitor the less aggressive Emigdiano living nearby. The Emigdiano, who were closely related to the Chumash of the coastal and interior lands to the west, had several villages near Fort Tejon. After the earlier Spanish and Mexican colonial Indian Reductions, they were generally cooperative with the European-American settlers and the U.S. Army.

== History ==
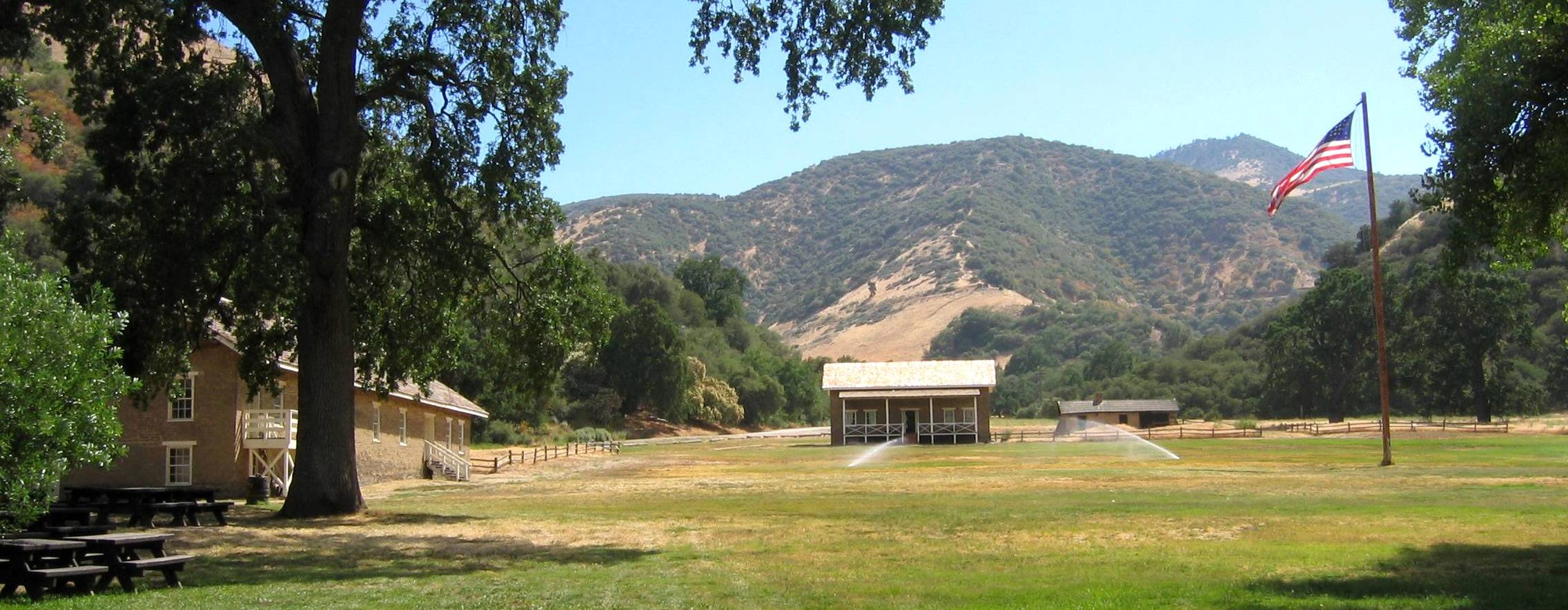
Parade ground at Fort Tejon, California, June 2006. The restored barracks are at left and the commanding officer's quarters are at the center, to the right of and behind which are the stabilized but unrestored officers' quarters. Split rail fences outline the foundations of buildings that have not been reconstructed.

At the urging of Edward Fitzgerald Beale, Superintendent of Indian Affairs in California, the U.S. Army established Fort Tejon in 1854. The garrison, when completed, included more than 40 one and two-story buildings constructed of wood and adobe on stone foundations.

Fort Tejon was the headquarters of the First U.S. Dragoons until those Regular Army troops were transferred to the East in July 1861 soon after the outbreak of the American Civil War. The fort was re-occupied by California volunteer troops in 1863. Those units included Companies D, E and G of the 2nd California Volunteer Cavalry from July 6 to August 17, 1863; and Company B of the 2nd California Volunteer Infantry, which remained there until Fort Tejon was abandoned for good on September 11, 1864.

The fort lay along the Stockton - Los Angeles Road. From 1858, it was a stagecoach station on the Butterfield Overland Mail, which followed the same route as far as Visalia. From 1858, Fort Tejon was the western terminus of the experimental U.S. Camel Corps, which used imported camels in an effort to carry supplies across arid regions in the Southwest. The soldiers found the camels hardy, but temperamental, and they spooked the horses used by the cavalry.

In the early part of 1863, California Volunteer regiments fought Paiute tribes in the Owens Valley, killing hundreds of them in a Native roundup. Finally, on July 11, 1863, the remaining 850 survivors were marched south across the San Joaquin Valley to Fort Tejón, the lone interior southern California Indian reservation under federal jurisdiction.

The great earthquake of 1857, which became known as the Fort Tejon earthquake, was centered nearly 100 miles away. The earthquake became associated with the fort by name because the area near the epicenter was sparsely populated. The most reliable report of the event was issued from the fort, nearly 93 miles (149.7 km) distant.

== Fort Tejon State Historic Park ==
The state historic park is listed on the National Register of Historic Places. In 1940, at the urging of local citizens, the Tejon Ranch Company deeded 5 acres (2.0 ha) to the State of California to establish a state park. Its original historic buildings have been documented by the Historic American Buildings Survey. Several buildings have been restored, and two are partially open to visitors. The restored barracks contain display cases of uniforms and a recreated troopers' quarters. The commanding officer's quarters have several restored and furnished rooms. Officers' quarters nearby are only stabilized in a state of arrested decay, with walls buttressed by masonry and lumber and tied together with reinforcing rods.

A quartermaster building has been reconstructed and houses materials used in dragoon life and Civil War reenactments. The sites of former buildings, planned for reconstruction, are marked by split rail fences along the outlines of their foundations. A park office, containing exhibits of dragoon life and restrooms, is at the east end of the parade ground near the parking lot by Interstate 5.

The park grounds include the original barracks, where the soldiers slept, and also the grave site of Peter Lebeck, which is indicated with a historical marker. The nearby town of Lebec is named after him.

Fort Tejon is the site of frequent Civil War reenactments presented by the Fort Tejon Historical Association.

The park contains a number of natural features of interest, including centuries-old valley oaks and California condors.

== 1857 Fort Tejon earthquake ==
The Fort Tejon earthquake occurred at about 8:20 AM (Pacific time) on January 9, 1857. It ruptured the San Andreas Fault for a length of about 350 kilometers (220 mi), between Parkfield and San Bernardino. Displacement along the fault was as much as 9 meters (30 feet) in the Carrizo Plain but less along the Palmdale section of the fault, closest to Los Angeles. The amount of fault slip gives this earthquake a moment magnitude of 7.9, comparable to that of the 1906 San Francisco earthquake. Based on the (uncertain) distribution of foreshocks for this earthquake, it is assumed that the beginning of the fault rupture (the epicenter) was in the area between Parkfield and Cholame, about 100 kilometers (62 mi) northwest. Nevertheless, it is usually called the "Fort Tejon" earthquake because this was the location of the greatest damage, most of the area being unpopulated at the time.

== See also ==
- Fort Tejon Historical Association
- California Historical Landmarks in Kern County
- California Historical Landmark
