= Tehachapi Mountains =

Mountain range of the Transverse Ranges in California

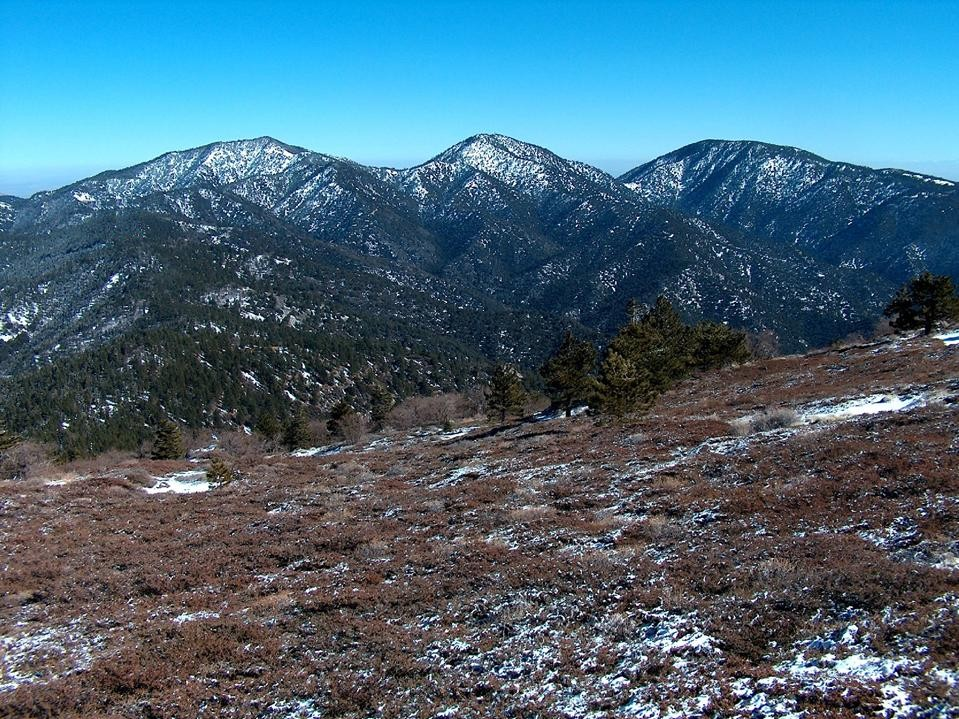
- Tehachapi Mountains Crest peaks

Highest point
- Peak: Double Mountain
- Elevation: 7,981 ft (2,433 m)

Dimensions
- Length: 40 mi (64 km)

Geography
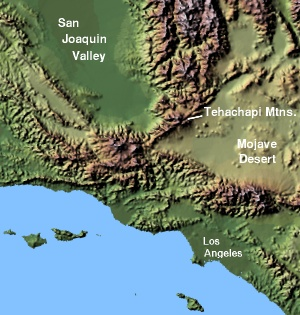
- Country: United States
- State: California
- Counties: Kern; Los Angeles
- Range coordinates: 34°57′N 118°35′W
- Parent range: Transverse Ranges
- Borders on: Sierra Nevada; San Emigdio Mountains; Sierra Pelona Mountains

The Tehachapi Mountains (/təˈhætʃəpi/) are a mountain range in the Transverse Ranges system of California in the Western United States. The range extends for approximately 40 miles (64 km) in southern Kern County and northwestern Los Angeles County and forms part of the boundary between the San Joaquin Valley and the Mojave Desert.

== Geography ==
The Tehachapis form a geographic, watershed, habitat, and rain shadow divide separating the San Joaquin Valley to the northwest and the Mojave Desert to the southeast. The Tehachapis' crest varies in height from approximately 4,000–8,000 feet (1,200–2,400 m). They are southeast of Bakersfield and the Central Valley, and west of Mojave and the Antelope Valley. The range runs southwest to northeast (SW-NE) connecting the Southern Sierra Nevada range on their northeast with the San Emigdio Mountains on the west and Sierra Pelona Mountains on the southwest.

The Tehachapis are delineated from the San Emigdio Mountains by Tejon Pass at the range's western end. The dramatic incline of Interstate 5 from the San Joaquin Valley floor up to the pass, is regionally referred to as The Grapevine, after Grapevine Canyon which it follows between the northern slopes of the two mountain ranges and is sometimes extended to include the portion of Interstate 5 on the southern side of Tejon Pass, especially during snow closures. The canyon was named after native grapevines, the California grapevine (Vitis californica), found at springs on its slopes. The California State Water Project is to the east, with the California Aqueduct pumped by the Edmonston Pumping Plant over/through the Tehachapis to Castaic Lake reservoir.

The Tehachapis are delineated from the Sierra Pelona Mountains by California State Route 138 at the range's southwestern end, connecting Interstate 5 and the Antelope Valley.

The Tehachapis are delineated from the Sierra Nevada by Tehachapi Pass and State Route 58 at the range's northeastern end, connecting the San Joaquin Valley and Mojave Desert. The Union Pacific north/south railroad line, with the famous Tehachapi Loop, crosses here also. The Tehachapi Pass Wind Farm is on its eastern side.

The Tehachapis, though neither as long or high as other California mountain ranges, are often considered the topographic feature that separates this part of Northern California from Southern California, with the geographic boundary often being Kern County.

== Geology ==
The Tehachapis are largely the result of the movements of the Garlock Fault, located along the southeastern base of the range, a major transform fault which runs from the San Andreas Fault in the west to the Sierra Nevada Fault on the east and some distance beyond. This earthquake fault is unusual in California in that it is a left-lateral fault — meaning that if one stands facing the fault, the land on the opposite side moves to the left — opposite to most of the state's faults which are right-lateral faults.

== Natural history ==
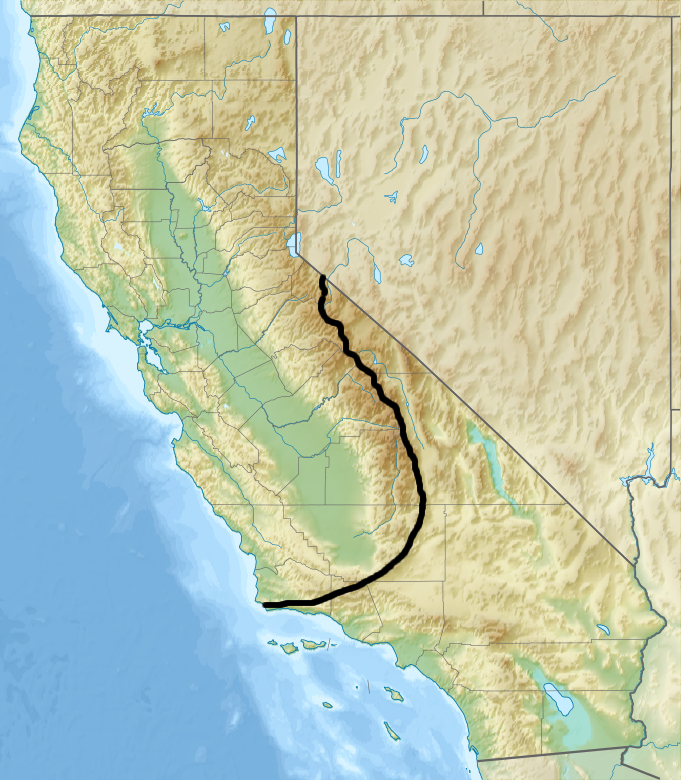
The Tehachapi and Sierra ranges form a significant barrier between bioregions.

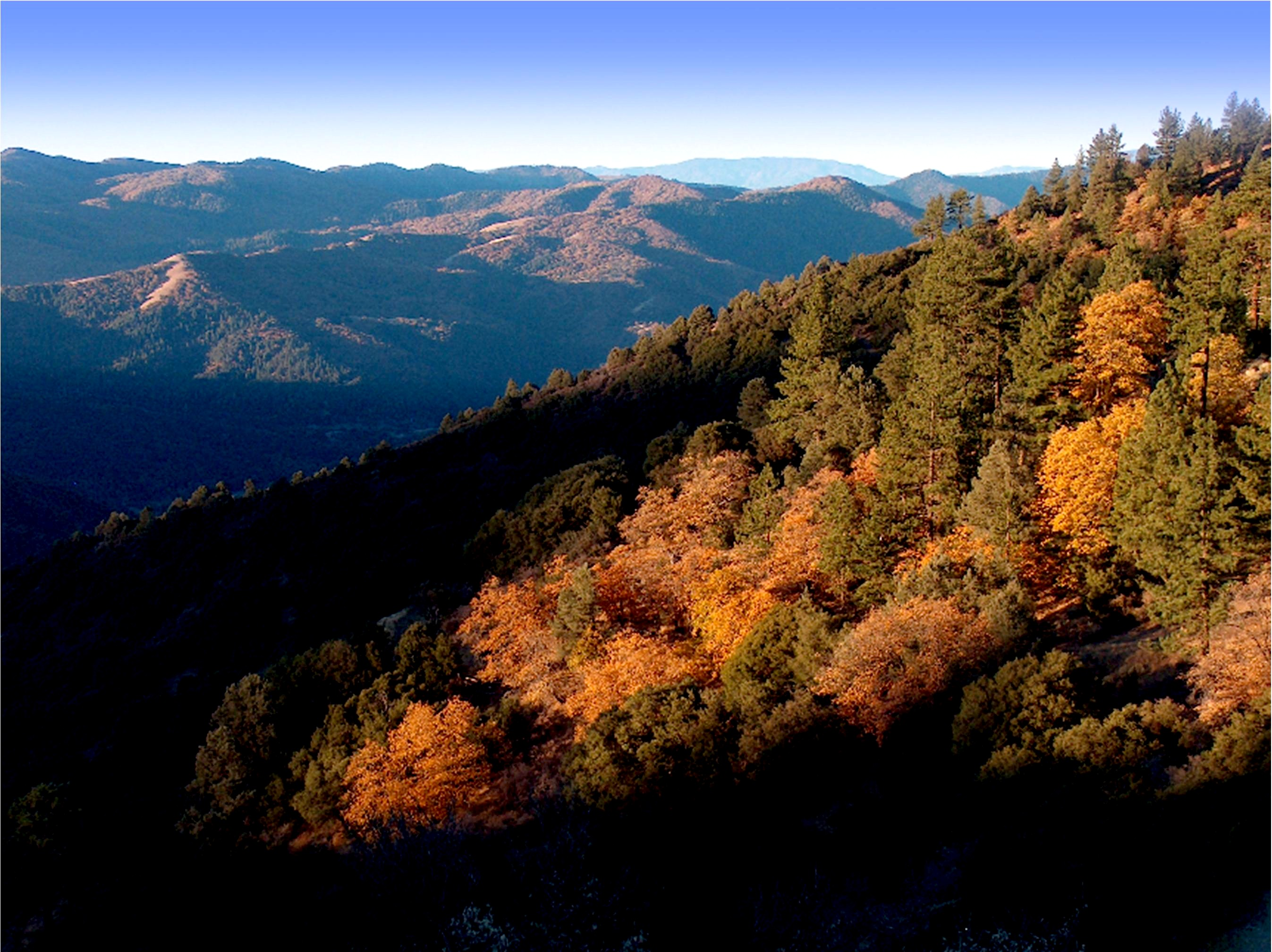
The California mixed evergreen forest plant community in the upper Tehachapi Mountains

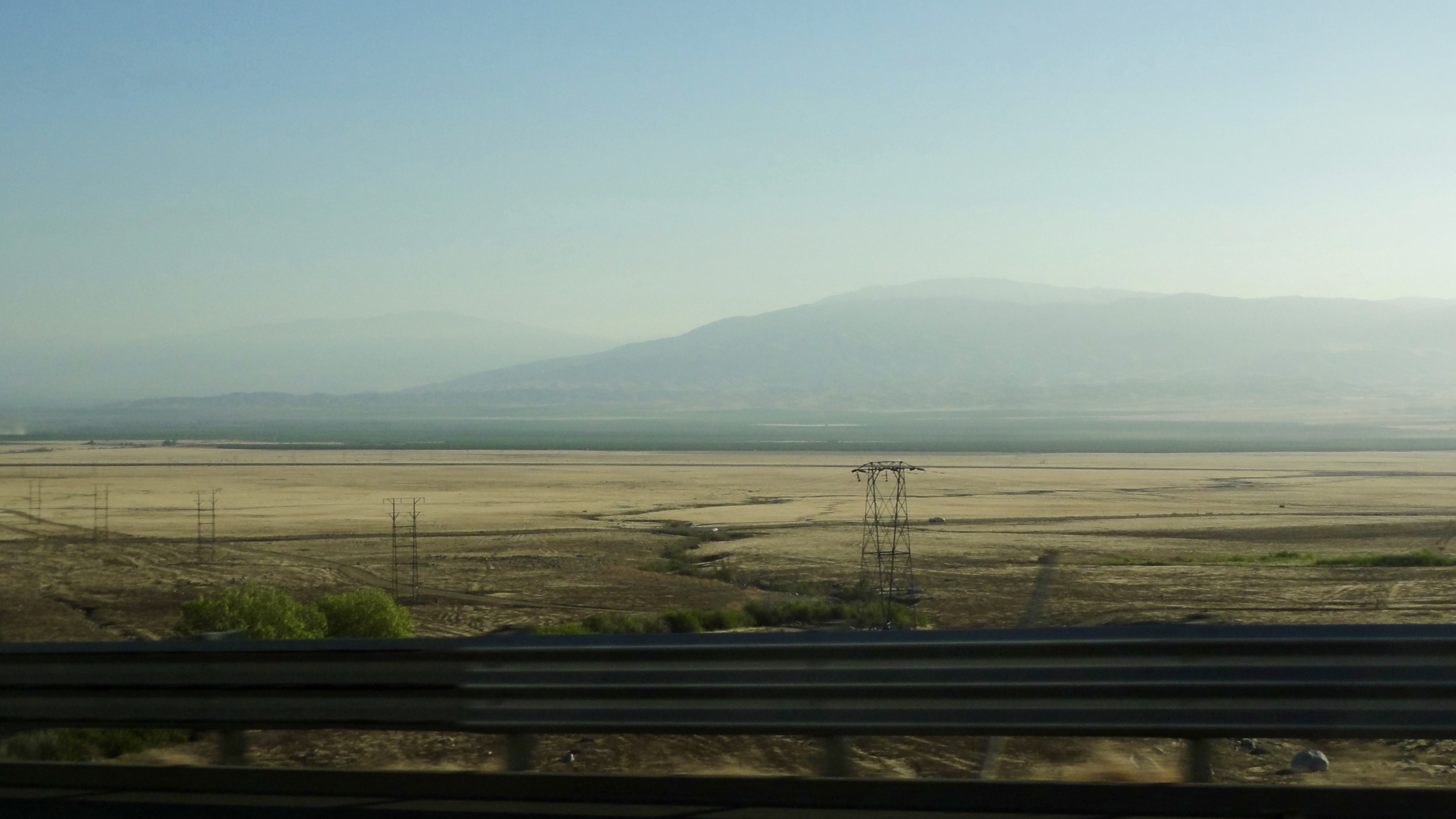
View of the Tehachapi Mountains from I-5 as it descends into the Central Valley

The Tehachapi Mountains are a major and crucial wildlife corridor and plant habitat bridge linking the other Transverse Ranges and the California Coast Ranges on the west with the Sierra Nevada on the east. Their relative lack of development, especially in the large Tejon Ranch section, have allowed the continuity of these ecological functions to date.

=== Flora ===
The Tehachapis are primarily in the California interior chaparral and woodlands sub-ecoregion, with native grasslands, California oak woodlands and oak savanna the predominant habitats. The higher montane elevations include the California mixed evergreen forest plant community. Some of the chaparral woodland species include: canyon live oak (Quercus chrysolepis), valley oak (Quercus lobata), blue oak (Quercus douglasii), and gray pine (Pinus sabiniana).

Montane species include: black oak (Quercus kelloggii), Coulter pine (Pinus coulteri), incense cedar (Calocedrus decurrens), white fir (Abies concolor), and in a few remote locations small stands of quaking aspen (Populus tremuloides).

The Tehachapi linanthus (Leptosiphon nudatus) is a phlox plant species endemic to chaparral habitat in the Tehachapi Mountains and the southern Sierra Nevada. The Tehachapi ragwort (Packera ionophylla) is an aster plant species endemic to forest habitat in the Tehachapis and eastern Transverse Ranges. The Tehachapi buckwheat (Eriogonum callistum) is known only from the chaparral of the Tehachapis.

=== Fauna ===
The Tehachapi slender salamander is endemic to the Tehachapi Mountains and a listed vulnerable species. The white-eared pocket mouse is endemic to the Tehachapis and San Bernardino Mountains and a listed endangered species.

There are at least 107 bird species, including the Steller's jay and mountain chickadee, found in the Tehachapis, many which consume acorns of the black oak (Quercus kelloggii) as part of their diet. Other flora found here include the buckbrush and mountain mahogany. The notable raptor is the California condor, a critically endangered species. As in many California mountains, larger fauna includes: mule deer, mountain lion, coyote, fox, black bear, feral pig, bobcat and raccoon.

The Tehachapi Mountains are also the only known breeding site prior to 1860 of the jaguar in the United States. The big cats were found there as recently as the late 1800s.

=== Climate ===
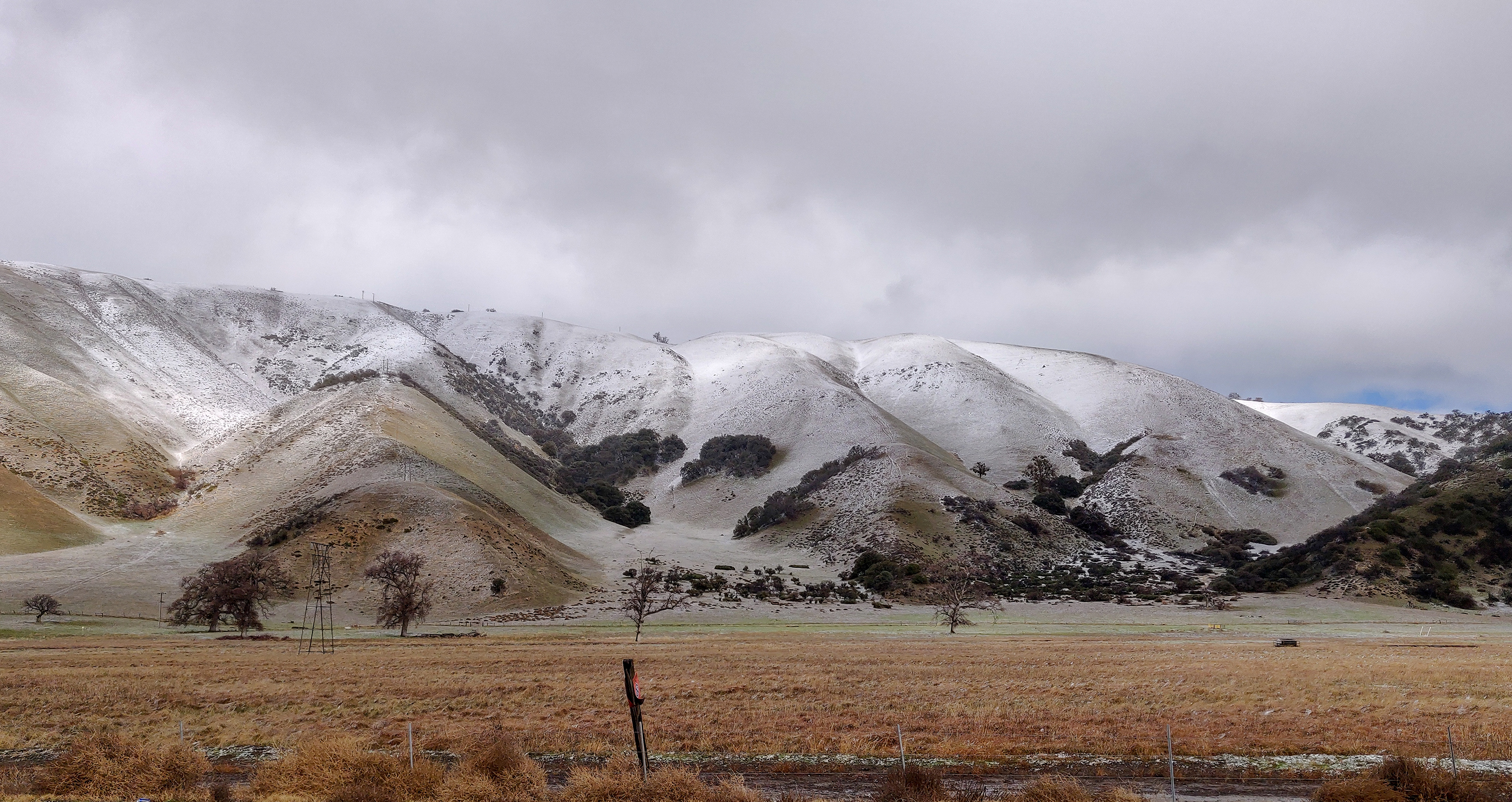
Winter snowfall on the southwestern slopes of the Tehachapi Mountains

The range includes and is the boundary between the xeric Mojave Desert and Mediterranean climate zones, and includes the subalpine zone. The majority of the range is in the Mediterranean climate zone, receiving precipitation in the winter similar to the neighboring Transverse Ranges in the Los Padres and Angeles National Forests to the west and southwest. They create a rain shadow for the eastern foothills ecotone into the Mojave climate zone that typically receives only a few inches of precipitation a year, usually in winter. Summer monsoon season can bring localized rains to the higher subalpine parts of the range. The wettest slopes receive about 20–25 inches of precipitation a year, some in the form of snow.

The prevailing wind is northwesterly, funneling up the east–west canyons from the San Joaquin Valley into the valleys, upper canyons, and passes of the Tehachapi range with regularity. The Tehachapi Wind Resource Area exists due to this. To the northwest lies the San Joaquin Valley with its grasslands and oak savanna climbing the broad western slopes of the range. The Tehachapis collect marine and valley moisture, which piles up into fog that blankets the windward sides of the range many weeks of the year. The higher north-facing slopes are mixed evergreen forest, while the south-facing are chaparral and woodlands, typical of the relationship between the cooler moisture-retaining northern slopes and the exposed warmer and drier southern slopes. Canyons can have year-round surface water flow, even on southern slopes, from springs and orographic enhancements bringing extra precipitation and snow from passing storms.

== History ==
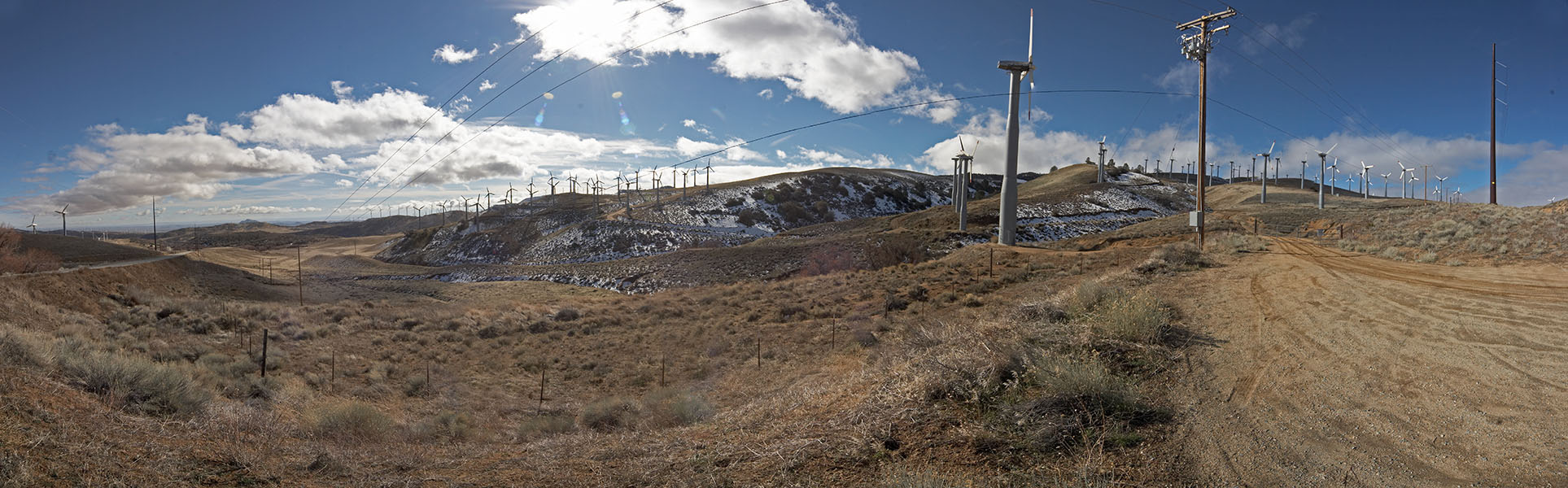
The eastern Tehachapi foothills: panoramic view with the Tehachapi Pass Wind Farm

The origin of the name Tehachapi may come from the Kawaiisu language, derived from the word "tihachipia," translated as "hard climb".
The historic Indigenous peoples of California with homelands in the Tehachapi Mountains were the:

- Kitanemuk
- Kawaiisu
- Serrano people

The historic Mexican land grants in the Tehachapis are:

- Rancho El Tejon (1843)
- Rancho Castac (1843)
- Rancho La Liebre (1846)
- Rancho Los Alamos y Agua Caliente (1846)

All four Tehachapi ranchos were acquired over 1855 to 1866 and combined by Edward Beale. As the Tejon Ranch it stayed in the family until sold by Truxtun Beale 1912. The purchase was by a Harry Chandler—Moses Sherman lead syndicate of land investors, and became a public company in 1936. Tejon Ranch is still one of the largest private landholdings in the state, and currently an undeveloped agricultural and wildland entity. The Tejon Ranch corporation has recently proposed major new developments in portions of the Tehachapi Mountains, including the Tejon Mountain Village and Centennial, California planned urban center.

== Historic sites ==
- Oak Creek Pass – Indian trail in the Tehachapis; Francisco Garces was first European to use the pass in 1776.
- Fort Tejon – 1854 fort, with the nearby former 1854 Chumash Sebastian Indian Reservation. Now Fort Tejon State Historic Park in the Tejon Pass area.
- 1857 Fort Tejon earthquake – Moment magnitude of 7.9, average slip along the fault was 4.5 meters (15 ft).
- Monolith Cement Works – Supplied concrete for the construction of Hoover Dam and other major public works; east of Tehachapi Pass.
- Old Tejon Pass – Another ancient native trail, used by Pedro Fages in 1772 and Jedediah Smith in 1827.

== Peaks ==
- Double Mountain 7,981 ft (2,433 m)
- Tehachapi Mountain 7,960+ ft (2,426+ m)
- Covington Mountain 7,877 ft (2,401 m)
- Cummings Mountain 7,760+ ft (2,365+ m)
- Bear Mountain 6,920+ ft (2,109+ m)
- Black Mountain 5,686 ft (1,733 m)
- Grapevine Peak 4,815 ft (1,468 m)

== See also ==
- Tehachapi, California
- Tejon Hills
- Tejon Ranch Radar Cross Section Facility
- Path 26
