= Tejon Ranch =

Land owner in California, USA

Coordinates: 35°01′31″N 118°44′47″W

- Traded as: NYSE: TRC; Russell 2000 Component
- Revenue: ▲US$49.6 million (2025)
- Net income: ▼US$0.07 million (2025)

Tejon Ranch Company (NYSE: TRC), based in Lebec, California, is one of the largest private landowners in California. The company was incorporated in 1936 to organize the ownership of a large tract of land that was consolidated from four Mexican land grants acquired in the 1850s and 1860s by ranch founder Edward Fitzgerald Beale.

The company owns over 270,000 acres (1,093 km^{2}) in the southern San Joaquin Valley, Tehachapi Mountains, and Antelope Valley. It is the largest contiguous piece of private property in the state. Tejon Ranch’s agricultural operation primarily grows almonds, pistachios, and wine grapes, along with some alfalfa and the occasional row crop. Cattle leases cover about 250,000 acres (1,012 km^{2}), and depending on the season, up to 12,000 head of cattle graze on the ranch.

It is a diversified development and agribusiness company which has been publicly listed since 1973. In May 2021, Barry Zoeller, vice president of corporate communications, said the firm derives revenue from

resort, residential, commercial and industrial development; from selling and licensing natural resources such as minerals, oil, and water; from crops such as pistachios, and ranch operations, including leasing land for cattle grazing; from their hunting program, in which sport hunters pay to be guided on hunts for wildlife on the ranch, and from providing locations for filming commercials, television and movies.

== History ==
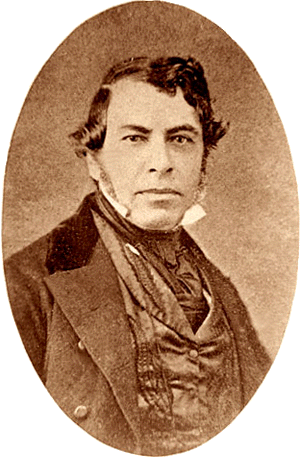
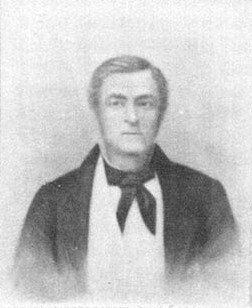
Rancho El Tejón was granted to Californio rancheros Ygnacio del Valle (left) and José Antonio Aguirre (right) in 1843, by Governor Micheltorena.

In 1843, the Mexican government made grants for the land that became three ranches: the 26,626-acre (107.75 km^{2}) Rancho Los Alamos y Agua Caliente; the 97,617-acre (395.04 km^{2}) Rancho El Tejon; and the 22,178-acre (89.75 km^{2}) Rancho Castac. A fourth tract, the 48,800-acre (197 km^{2}) Rancho La Liebre, was granted in 1846.

At the urging of Edward Beale, Superintendent of Indian Affairs in California, the Sebastian Indian Reservation was established in 1853 on Rancho El Tejon, and Fort Tejon was established by the U.S. Army in 1854 on Rancho Castac. These were federal projects, consisting of major developments and improvements, on what was the Mexican grantees' private land.

In 1855, Edward Beale purchased Rancho La Liebre. The Army abandoned Fort Tejon in 1864. Beale bought Rancho El Tejon and Rancho de los Alamos y Agua Caliente in 1865, and Rancho Castac in 1866. With the purchase of these four Mexican land grants, Beale created the present day Tejon Ranch.

Beale's son, Truxtun Beale, sold the Tejon Ranch in 1912 to a syndicate of investors headed by Los Angeles Times publisher Harry Chandler and land developer Moses Sherman. Both also had extensive holdings in the San Fernando Valley. In 1917, some surviving Kitanemuk Indians lived on Tejon Ranch.

In 1936, the Tejon Ranch Company became a public company, with the Chandler–Sherman group retaining a controlling interest. The Chandlers' Times Mirror Company sold its stake in 1997. It has been publicly listed since 1973 and most recently has been on the New York Stock Exchange.

"In 1916 El Tejon Land Company of Kern County filed suit to evict the El Tejon Indians from the El Tejon Ranch, which the Indians owned under Spanish and Mexican laws that the United States had agreed to uphold under the Treaty of Guadalupe Hidalgo. The company had been renting the land from the Indians and employing Indians to work on it. They began to withhold rent payments, and the Indians, fearful of losing their jobs, dared not demand the rent be paid. After waiting the requisite number of years, the company claimed ownership of the land on the basis of peaceful possession."

=== Hunting ===
In 2012, the ranch suspended all hunting after a 2011 California Department of Fish and Game investigation into the illegal killing of mountain lions. The investigation was spurred by a whistleblower named Bron Sanders who filed a lawsuit on May 3, 2011. Sanders claimed to have witnessed the killing of 20 mountain lions, which he claimed were motivated by the ranch managers' views on the California Wildlife Protection Act of 1990, which banned the hunting of mountain lions for sport. Ranch officials initially called Sanders' allegations "ridiculous and untrue". The investigation supported Sanders' claims that mountain lions were illegally killed. Tejon Ranch agreed to pay $136,500 in fines and restitution for the killing of 11 mountain lions.

== Development and conservation agreement ==
A large number of California native plants occur on land owned by Tejon Ranch. It is situated where several ecoregions meet and overlap: the Mojave Desert, the Central Valley, the Sierra Nevada, and the Transverse Ranges of Southern California. The interaction of unique geography and varying climates has produced high biodiversity, as evidenced by showy spring wildflower blooms.

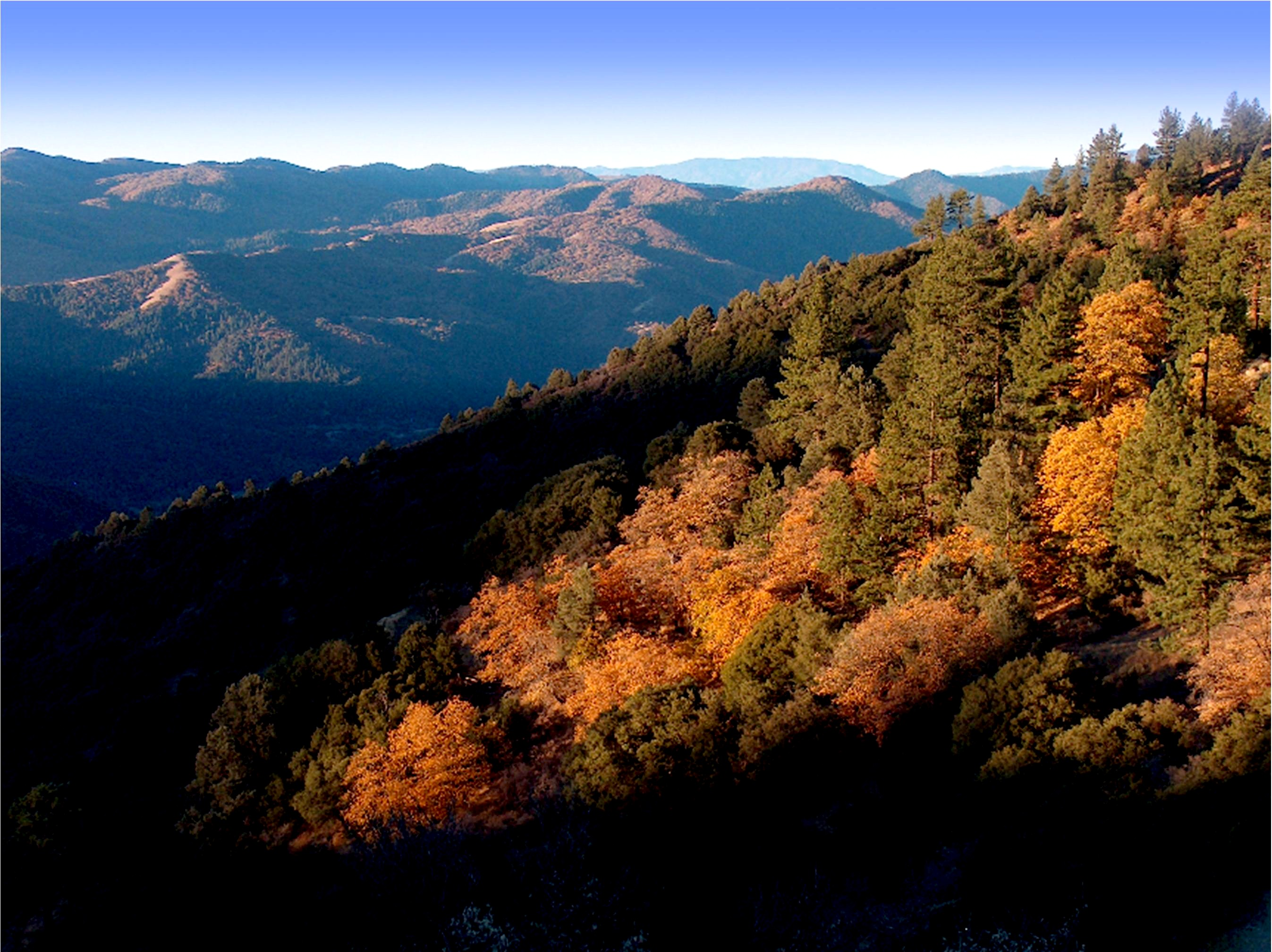
Overlooking the eastern half of Tejon Ranch from the Tehachapi Crest. Frazier Mountain in the Los Padres National Forest is in the background.

An agreement between the Tejon Ranch Company and a coalition of environmental groups, announced in May 2008, is designed to permanently protect 240,000 acres (970 km^{2}) of the historic ranch. It is the largest conservation and land-use pact in California history.

The agreement was finally reached to conclude 20 months of off-and-on negotiations, but only after a marathon three-day bargaining session in April 2008. California Governor Arnold Schwarzenegger traveled to the ranch in May of that year to take part in the announcement, with the signing of the agreement in June.

Highlights of the pact are:

- Tejon Ranch will set aside 178,000 acres (720 km^{2}) for conservation and will provide an option for public purchase of an additional 62,000 acres (250 km^{2}) – 49,000 to create a state park, 10,000 to realign 37 miles (60 km) of the Pacific Crest hiking trail, and the rest for docent-led tours of "sensitive habitat." Tejon Ranch will accept the value set by a state appraiser, both sides agreed. Easements will be phased in but will allow existing buildings and historic uses, like cattle grazing and movie-making, to continue.
- The environmental coalition of the Natural Resources Defense Council, the Sierra Club, Audubon California, the Planning and Conservation League, and the Endangered Habitats League will drop their threatened campaign to oppose the three planned Tejon Ranch developments. But opposition will still be mounted by the Center for Biological Diversity on the grounds that the pact would threaten wildlife.
- A 12-member "independent Tejon Ranch Conservancy" will be appointed by the company and the environmental coalition to manage the preserved land "in perpetuity." The company is to provide $800,000 a year for seven years to get the conservancy started.
- In developing Tejon Mountain Village, the company agreed to leave four of the five northern-facing ridge lines free from development because they are prime foraging grounds for the threatened California condor.
- The Pacific Crest Trail, which runs from Mexico to Canada, will be rerouted on 10,000 acres (40 km^{2}) of Tejon Ranch property so that it will go through the ranch, thus opening vast tracts of wilderness and creating a natural corridor between the Sierra Nevada range of mountains to the east, through the Mojave Desert and the San Joaquin Valley to the Pacific Coast on the west.
- Tejon Ranch will have the right to proceed with three massive development projects. All the projects must undergo approvals by county, state, and federal authorities.

=== Tejon Mountain Village ===
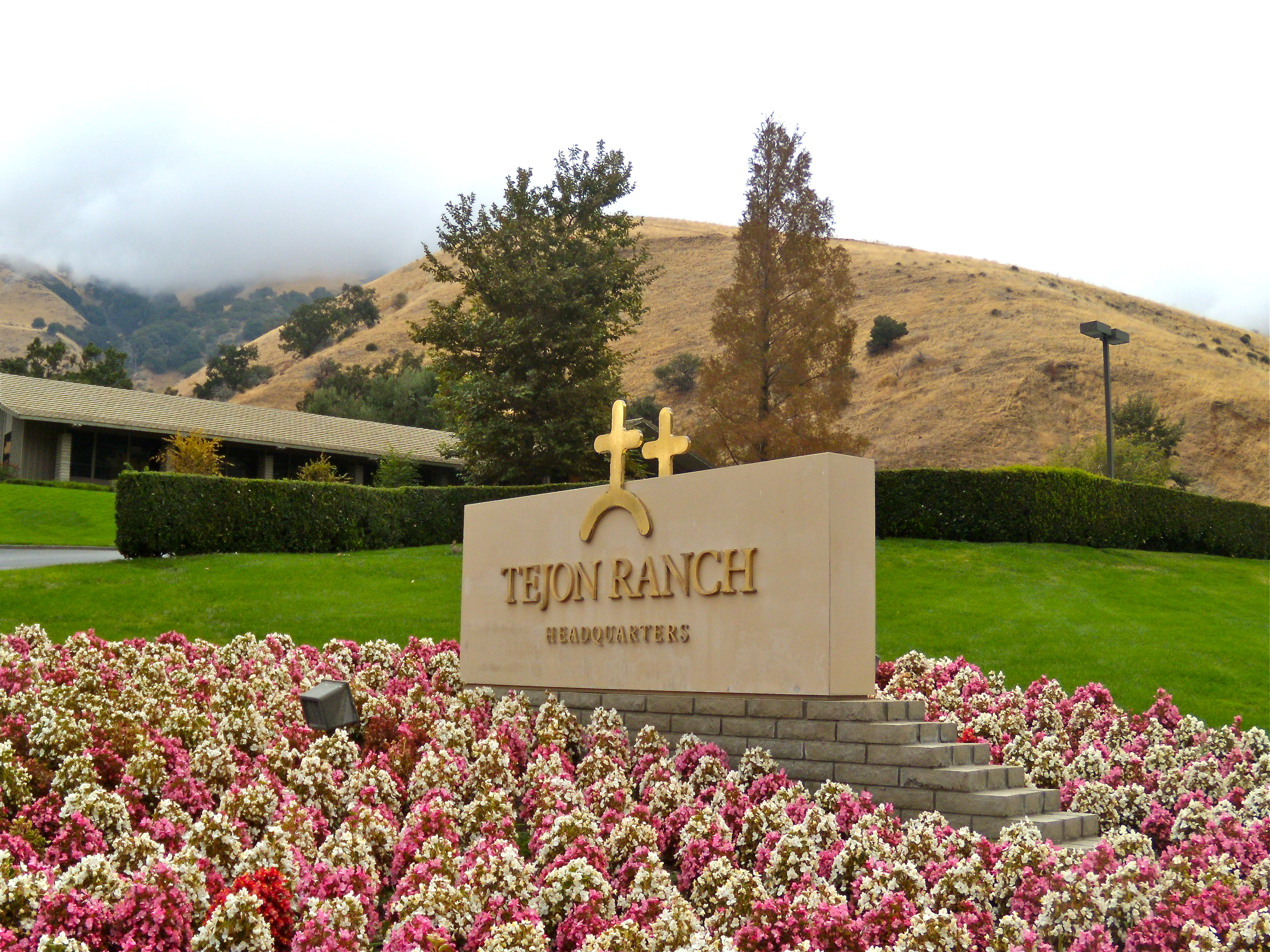
Tejon Ranch Company headquarters. This will be the site of Tejon Mountain Village.

The most extensive of these projects, Tejon Mountain Village is a proposed residential, commercial, and recreational development that has been a matter of heated debate for years in the Mountain Communities of the Tejon Pass. The development would include homes, commercial buildings, hotels, and golf courses.

=== Centennial ===
Centennial is a proposed new town, or planned development, on the southern section of Tejon Ranch property, in Los Angeles County.

=== Tejon Industrial Complex ===
Three large warehouses have been built by the Tejon Ranch Company as the first in what will be an industrial complex designed to compete with distribution centers in Riverside and San Bernardino counties. Foreign-made goods will be trucked in from California ports such as Oakland and Los Angeles and stored until they are delivered to retailers. About a third of the park is expected to be declared a foreign trade zone, allowing importers to defer payment of U.S. customs duty. The site also includes commercial uses such as restaurants, automobile service stations, and a large truck stop. Several bus lines connect workers to neighboring communities, including Bakersfield and Arvin.

== See also ==
- Tejon Ranch Radar Cross Section Facility
