= San Francisquito Creek (Santa Clara River tributary) =

Tributary of the Santa Clara River in California, United States

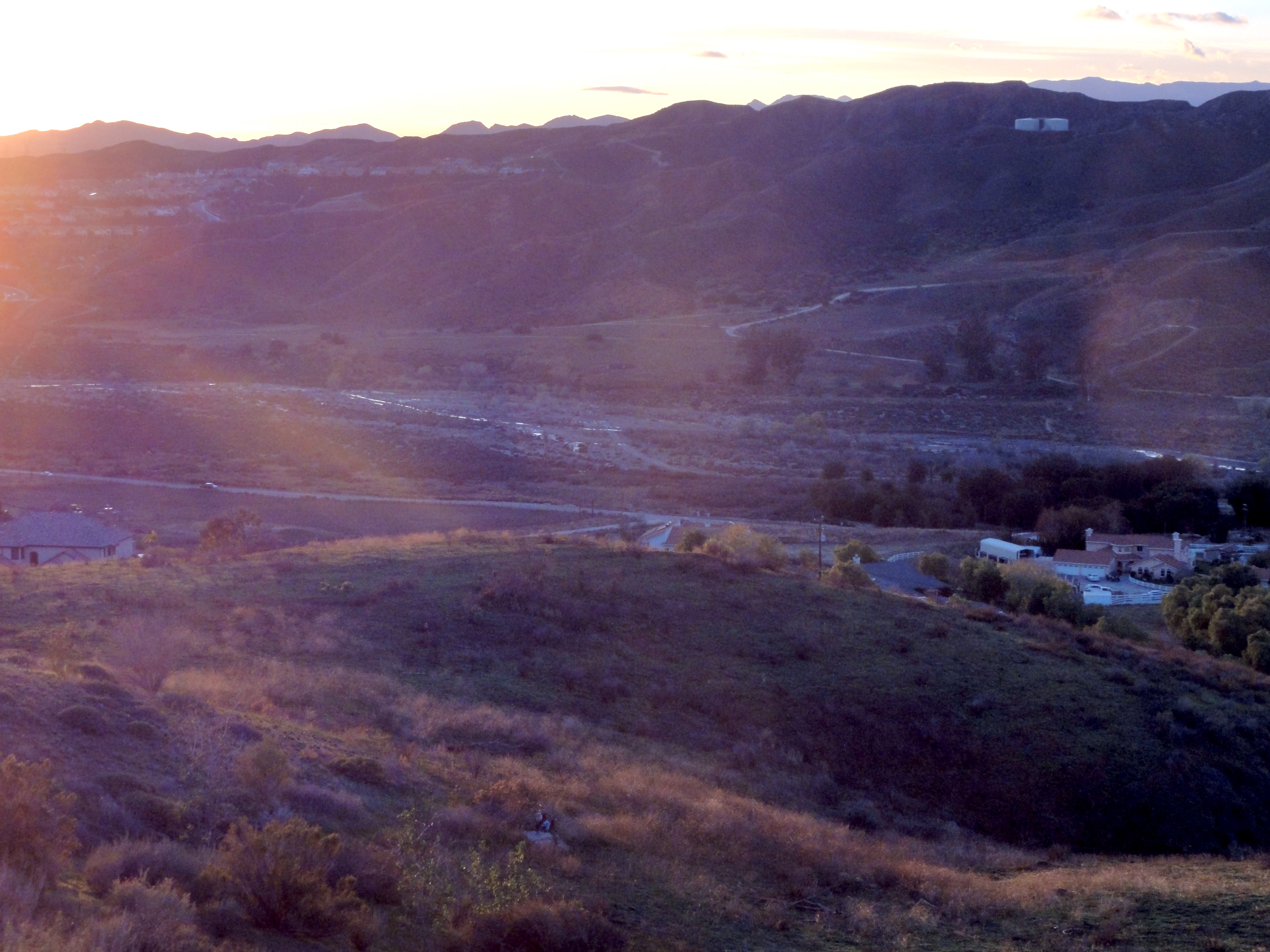
- Etymology: Spanish
- Native name: Arroyo San Francisquito (Spanish)

Location
- Country: United States
- State: California
- Region: Los Angeles County

Physical characteristics
- Source
  - location: southwest of San Francisquito Pass
  - coordinates: 34°38′12.62″N 118°23′5.86″W
  - elevation: 3,544 feet (1,080 m)
- Mouth
  - location: confluence with Santa Clara River
  - coordinates: 34°25′34.21″N 118°34′9.26″W
  - elevation: 1,082 feet (330 m)
- Length: 22 mi (35 km)

Basin features
- River system: Santa Clara River

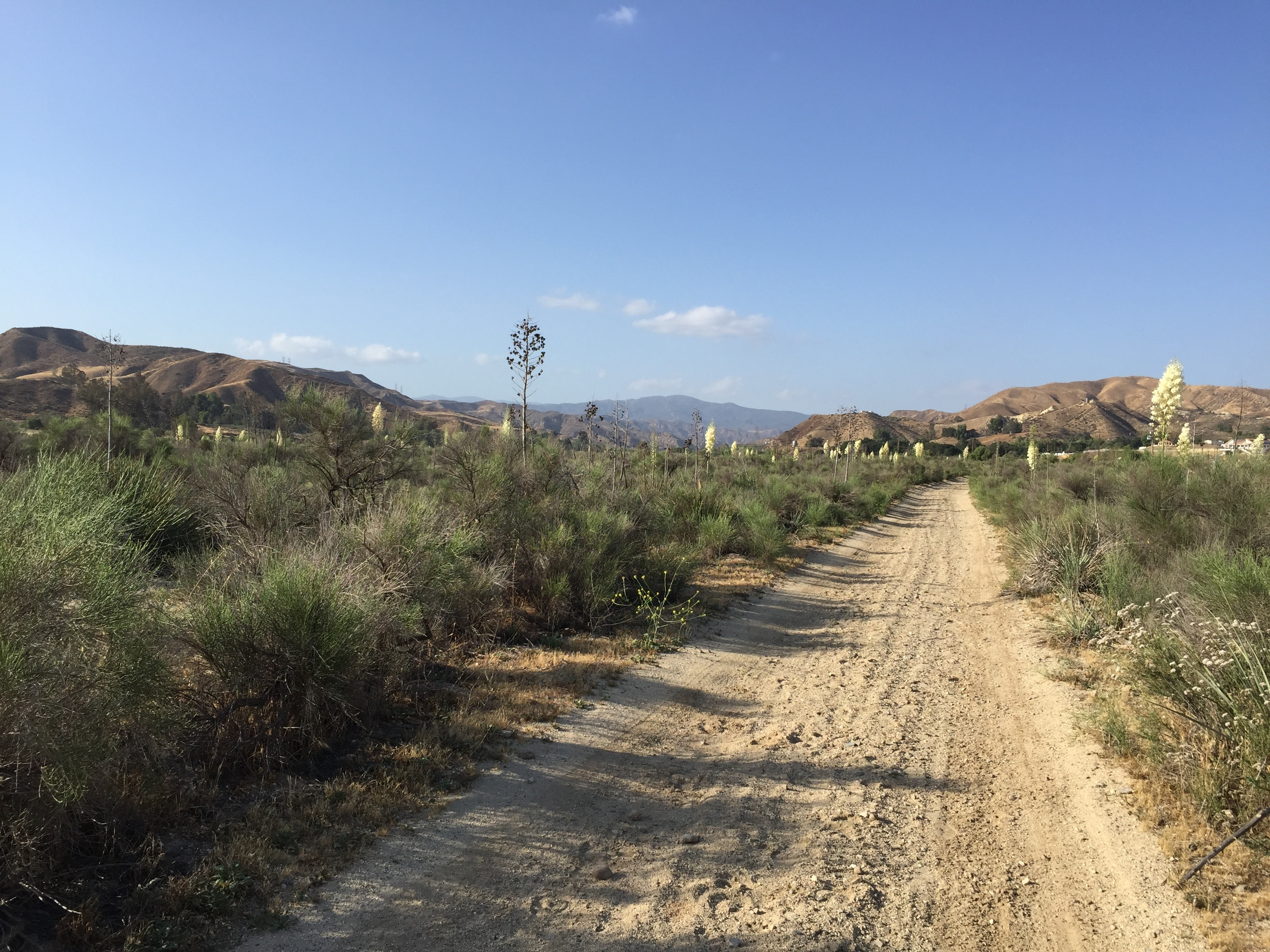
The creek bed runs dry during the late spring and summer months, with native yucca in full bloom.

San Francisquito Creek, in Los Angeles County, is a tributary stream of the Santa Clara River. It drains the south facing slopes of the Sierra Pelona Mountains of the San Gabriel Mountains within the Transverse Range of California, United States.

The closest populated place to the creek is Green Valley that lies along the upper course of the creek, in the upper part of San Francisquito Canyon, southeast of the source of the creek at San Francisquito Pass. At its mouth and confluence with the Santa Clara River is Santa Clarita.

== History ==
Originally called the Arroyo San Francisquito, San Francisquito Creek and its canyon was for many years the major route of wagon and stage roads northward from Los Angeles into the San Joaquin Valley. The first was El Camino Viejo, later there was the Stockton–Los Angeles Road and the Butterfield Overland Mail stage route. The wagon road followed the course of the stream in the bottom of the canyon. Two stage stations for the Overland Mail were along the Creek. Widow Smith's Station was located about 1 mi (1.6 km) down the canyon from Green Valley. and King's Station, located 10 mi (16 km) south of Widow Smith's Station in lower San Francisquito Canyon.

=== St. Francis Dam ===
The St. Francis Dam was built on San Francisquito Creek in San Francisquito Canyon, and completed in 1926. It was part of the Los Angeles Aqueduct system, creating a storage reservoir for the imported Owens Valley water. The dam failed in 1928, due to a then undetectable geological weakness in the bedrock. The resulting flood sent a massive wave of water and debris down the canyon and the Santa Clara River Valley and to the sea, killing up to 600 people. Some of these debris can still be found today littering the creek bed.

=== Recent development ===
In 1999, the city of Santa Clarita established the creek as an ecological conservation zone and has since built a pair of 2.5 mi (4.0 km) long bike and pedestrian paths along the eastern and western banks of the river as it flows into the city.

== See also ==
- Castaic Creek
