= Carol Bundy =

American serial killer (1942–2003)

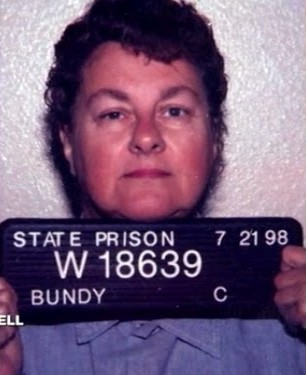
- Prison photograph from 1998
- Born: Carol Mary Peters; August 26, 1942; Lowell, Massachusetts, U.S.
- Died: December 9, 2003 (aged 61); Central California Women's Facility, Chowchilla, California, U.S.
- Other names: The Hollywood Slasher; The Sunset Strip Killer; The Sunset Strip Slayer
- Conviction: First degree murder (2 counts)
- Penalty: Life imprisonment with the possibility of parole after 52 years

Details
- Victims: 2+
- Span of crimes: June 1, 1980 – August 4, 1980
- Country: United States
- State: California
- Date apprehended: August 11, 1980

Carol Mary Bundy (née Peters; August 26, 1942 – December 9, 2003) was an American double murderer and suspected serial killer. Bundy and Doug Clark became collectively known as the Sunset Strip Killers after being convicted of a series of lust murders in Los Angeles during the late spring and early summer of 1980.

== Early life ==
Bundy had a troubled childhood, as both of her parents were abusive alcoholics. Bundy's mother died when she was a child and her father sexually abused her starting at the age of 11. After Bundy's father remarried, he put her in various foster homes. When Bundy was 17 years old, she married a 56-year-old man.

By the time Bundy met Doug Clark at the age of 37, she had just escaped a third marriage to an abusive man, by whom she had two young sons. She had begun an affair with her apartment block manager, part-time country singer Jack Murray, and had attempted to bribe Murray's wife into leaving him. After Murray's wife compelled him to evict Bundy from the block, Bundy continued to show up regularly to venues where he was singing. It was at one of these venues, a bar called Little Nashville, where she first met Clark in 1980. Clark soon moved in with Bundy and they found out that they shared dark sexual fantasies.

== Murders ==
On August 9, 1980, the decomposed body of John Robert Murray, 45, was found in a van parked just blocks away from his home in Van Nuys. Murray's body suffered stab wounds to the chest and was decapitated. His head was never found. Two days later, Bundy called police and confessed to shooting her lover, John "Jack" Murray, with her chrome Raven gun, five days before his body was found.

On March 3, 1981, the incomplete skeleton of an unidentified young woman was found buried in a shallow stream bed near the Bouquet Reservoir. Though only a few bones remained, investigators did recover a skull with a bullet hole. The firearm wound matched the description of the murder of a prostitute that Clark and Bundy had picked up, according to their own testimonies. Clark claimed Bundy had shot the young woman in the head, stripped her bare naked and instructed him to drive to a location in Green Valley, where they disposed of the body. Clark also declared that Bundy fondled the dying victim along the way. It was later revealed that Bundy confided in a fellow nurse about her involvement in the murders of Murray and that of the unidentified woman, though she alleged that Clark had fired the fatal shot.

== Arrest and trial ==
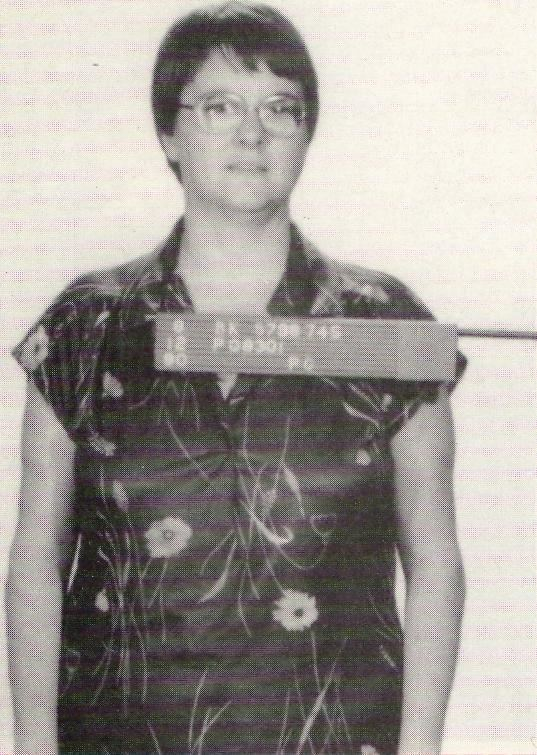
Bundy in a 1980 police mugshot

Bundy was arrested on August 11, 1980, at her home in Burbank. Clark was arrested the same day. Two days later, she was arraigned for the murder of John Robert Murray and held without bail.

Sealed documents of a court session on September 18 of that year revealed that Bundy killed Murray in an effort to prevent him from going to authorities after she told him that her roommate, Douglas Clark, committed the Sunset slayings. She also told the court that she had to cut off his head to prevent the bullets being traced back to her. Co-workers of Bundy testified that she confessed to being present during the murder of a young woman and helped dump her body afterwards.

On May 2, 1983, Bundy pleaded guilty in Los Angeles County Superior Court to the murders of Murray in 1980 and of the unidentified woman whose skeleton was found in 1981. Her plea came as a surprise to prosecutors, as Bundy had originally pleaded not guilty and not guilty by reason of insanity. Though no bargain was made, by pleading guilty, the district attorney could not prove special circumstances, a requirement for life without the possibility of parole. Prosecutors had already agreed to remove the death penalty upon Bundy testifying against Clark during his trial. For his part in the crimes, Clark was sentenced to death but died of natural causes on death row on October 11, 2023.

On May 31, 1983, Bundy was sentenced to 52 years to life: 27 years to life for the murder of Murray, and another 25 years to life, to be served consecutively, for assisting in the death of the unidentified female.

== Death ==
Bundy died in prison from heart failure at the Central California Women's Facility on December 9, 2003, at the age of 61.

== In popular culture ==
Susan Priver plays Bundy in the 2026 biopic Sunset Strip Killers, directed by Chad Ferrin, to be released on July 14, 2026.

== See also ==
- Gerald and Charlene Gallego
