= Doug Clark (serial killer) =

American serial killer (1948–2023)

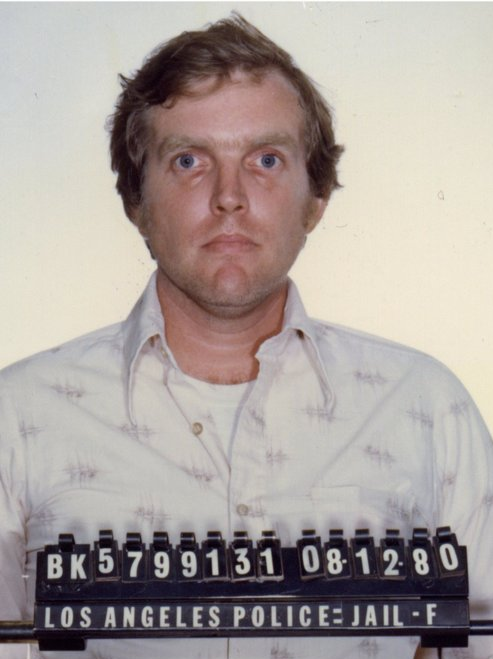
- Mugshot of Clark taken after his arrest in 1980
- Born: Douglas Daniel Clark; March 10, 1948; Pennsylvania, U.S.
- Died: October 11, 2023 (aged 75); Marin County, California, U.S.
- Other names: The Hollywood Slasher; The Sunset Strip Killer; The Sunset Strip Slayer
- Conviction: First degree murder with special circumstances (6 counts)
- Penalty: Death

Details
- Victims: 7+
- Span of crimes: June 1, 1980 – August 5, 1980 (confirmed)
- Country: United States
- State: California
- Date apprehended: August 11, 1980

Douglas Daniel Clark (March 10, 1948 – October 11, 2023) was an American serial killer and necrophile. Clark and his accomplice, Carol Mary Bundy, were collectively known as the Sunset Strip Killers and were responsible for the deaths of at least seven individuals, although they are considered suspects in the deaths of several other women and young girls. Clark was charged with six murders in Los Angeles, California, and was convicted in 1983. Clark's victims were typically young prostitutes or teenage runaways. His victims were decapitated, and their severed heads kept as mementos.

== Early life ==
Douglas Daniel Clark was born on March 10, 1948, and was the third son of five children to a retired Navy Lieutenant Commander turned international Naval Intelligence officer. Clark enjoyed a comfortable childhood as a "military brat." His family moved frequently during Clark's childhood due to his father's job, and he later claimed to have lived in 37 countries including India, Switzerland, and the Marshall Islands. In 1958, his father left the Navy for a civilian position as an engineer with the Transport Company of Texas, but the family still moved around. Clark was sent to the exclusive International School of Geneva. As a teenager, Clark reportedly recorded his sexual escapades with girls at school without their knowledge and began developing dark sexual fantasies of rape, murder, mutilation, and necrophilia.

When he graduated high school in 1967, Clark enlisted in the U.S. Air Force and was stationed in Colorado and Ohio. Clark was eventually discharged from the Air Force, and he drifted around for the next decade, often working as a mechanic. He moved to Los Angeles and was employed as a steam plant operator for the Los Angeles Department of Water and Power, working at the Valley Generating Station before abruptly quitting. Subsequently, Clark became a boiler operator at the Jergens Soap Company factory in Burbank but was fired due to a high rate of absences and violent threats he had made against his coworkers. During this time, Clark also spent the majority of his spare time in local bars and nightclubs searching for lonely, older women whom he could seduce out of their money. One of the bars he frequented in the area was Little Nashville, where he met 36-year-old Carol Bundy on Christmas Day 1979. Bundy was a vocational nurse and a mother of two who had left her abusive husband in January 1979.

== Murders ==
Bundy and Clark developed an intense sadomasochistic relationship, and Clark frequently brought sex workers back to the couple's apartment to have threesomes. Then, when Clark took an interest in an 11-year-old neighbour, Bundy helped lure the girl into posing for pornographic photographs. Clark quickly escalated from pedophilia to murder, talking about how much he would like to kill a girl during sex. He persuaded Bundy to purchase two pistols for him to use, reportedly seeking to fulfill his fantasy of killing a woman during sex and feeling her vaginal contractions as she died. During 1980, Bundy and Clark are believed to have murdered at least seven persons.

- The partial remains of two victims were found in Los Angeles County, California, on January 26, 1980, at around 1:00 p.m. in a river bed north of Magic Mountain Parkway, west of the Old Road and south of the Valencia Sewage Treatment Plant. Both had been shot to death and are known as the Valencia Jane Does.
- On June 30, 1980, a group of snake hunters off the Golden State Freeway near Sylmar, in the San Fernando Valley, discovered a woman's mummified corpse. She was identified as 17-year-old Sacramento teenager named Marnette Carrie Comer. She had been reported as a runaway on January 15, 1980. She was contacted by authorities in Anaheim on May 23. She was last seen alive on June 1, and had been dead at least three weeks when she was found. She had a history of engaging in prostitution and frequented the Sunset Strip area. She was Clark and Bundy's first victim.
- On June 11, 1980, stepsisters Gina Marano, 15, and Cynthia Leigh Chandler, 16, vanished from Huntington Beach, while trying to meet with friends. They were found the following morning, beside the Ventura Freeway near Griffith Park, in Los Angeles; each had been shot in the side of the head. Clark later came home and told Bundy about the two teenagers whom he had murdered after picking them up on the Sunset Strip. He had ordered them to perform fellatio on him and then shot them both in the head before taking them to a garage and raping their dead bodies. An uneasy Bundy phoned the police, admitting to having some knowledge of the murders, but refused to provide any clues as to Clark's identity. Clark told Bundy that if either of them were apprehended, he would take the blame in the hope that she would be allowed to go free.
- On June 24, 1980, Clark killed two sex workers, 24-year-old Karen Lee Jones, and 20-year-old Exxie LaFaye Wilson. Jones was found that day behind a Burbank, California, steakhouse, murdered by a single gunshot to the head. Later police were summoned to Studio City, where the headless body of Wilson had been found by pedestrians. Clark had lured Jones and Wilson into his car, shot them, and dumped their bodies in plain sight but not before removing Wilson's head. Clark took the head back home and stored it in the refrigerator. Bundy, upon seeing it, put make-up on it before Clark used it again for another "bout of necrophilia." She later recalled, "We had a lot of fun with her. I was making her up like a Barbie with makeup." On June 27, the couple put the freshly cleaned head in an ornate wooden box and dumped it in a Hollywood alleyway.
- On August 5, 1980, Bundy attended a country music performance by 45-year-old Australian national John Robert Murray, her former apartment manager and lover. After the performance, Bundy conversed with Murray and drunkenly talked about what she and Clark were doing. Murray was alarmed and implied that he might tell the police. Bundy then lured Murray into his van to have sex. Once they were inside, she shot, stabbed and decapitated him. Bundy left various clues behind, including shell casings in the van. Two days later, Bundy bowed to psychological pressure and confessed to her co-workers that she had killed Murray. They called the police, and she gave a full confession to her and Clark's crimes. Murray's head was never found.

Forensic facial reconstruction of Clark's unidentified victim, found in 1980

- Clark is believed to have murdered an unidentified youth who was discovered on August 26, 1980, in Newhall, California, near a pair of water towers by a maintenance worker inspecting the source of a foul odour. The remains had been somewhat disarticulated; the female had been killed by a single .25 bullet to one of the temporal bones of her skull and was found wearing only a red sweatshirt. Her face was reconstructed by the National Center for Missing and Exploited Children in efforts to identify her, as her remains were unrecognizable due to skeletonization. Bundy informed police that Clark had stated this particular victim was a prostitute from Hollywood. She elaborated that he had shot the female in the back of the head during a sexual act while inside his vehicle. After her death, she was disposed of in Newhall, after she was raped post-mortem. She is known as the Newhall Jane Doe, or as Jane Doe 18.
- An unidentified female was allegedly killed by Clark after a sexual encounter, based on statements made by Bundy that he had dumped her body in Tuna Canyon as they drove past the area in late July 1980. She had been shot in the left side of her forehead, and her clothing had been removed and placed around her hips. The woman was not explicitly described as a prostitute. The woman's partially mummified skeleton was found by a passer-by at the base of a hill on August 28, 1980, in a mountainous area in Malibu, California. Clark denied involvement, providing an alibi that placed him hundreds of miles from the scene on the day this victim was killed. The jury, however, decided that he was, indeed, responsible. She is known as the Malibu Jane Doe, or Jane Doe 99.
- "Cathy," also known as Jane Doe 28, was a female whose remains were recovered on March 2, 1981, in Green Valley, California. Only the skull, mandible, a femur, along with some ribs and vertebrae were recovered. She had been shot in the head. She was allegedly a sex worker who had been killed in late July 1980 while engaged in a sexual act. Clark claimed Bundy was the shooter and that she had instructed him to drive to the location in Green Valley, where she stripped the body naked and disposed of it. Clark also declared that Bundy fondled the victim's body along the way. During the trial phase of their prosecution, documents regarding this victim were misplaced, and evidence was ruled "irrelevant." Neither Clark nor Bundy was charged for the murder although it is generally believed they both were responsible.

== Arrest, conviction and death ==
Clark and Bundy were arrested and jailed on August 11, 1980. After the pair were arrested, the murder weapons were found hidden at Clark's workplace. Bundy was charged with two murders: Murray and "Cathy" whose killing she confessed to having been present at. Clark was charged with six murders.

Throughout Clark's case, which began in 1982, he intentionally caused delays by complicating and drawing out the process through misuse of the court to his advantage. His behavior included using vulgar language and making countless demands in court. After initially being denied, he was ultimately granted access to the law library for two hours per day, seven days per week and proceeded to represent himself while maintaining court appointed attorneys for counsel. He acquired knowledge through his access to the law library and used it to formulate demands, appeals, and contentions that had to be addressed before the case could be concluded. Gloria Keyes, a forensic psychiatrist, testified that Clark had antisocial personality disorder.

At his trial, he acted as his defense counsel and tried to blame Bundy for everything, claiming he had been manipulated. The jury did not believe him, and he was sentenced to death in 1983. Per California law, all death sentences are automatically appealed and reviewed. Upon review in 1992, his sentence was upheld. Clark remained on California's death row until his death from natural causes in 2023.

Bundy made a plea bargain and in return for her testimony was sentenced to 52-years-to-life imprisonment. Bundy died in prison from heart failure on December 9, 2003, at the age of 61. Clark died of cardiovascular disease at a medical facility on October 11, 2023, at the age of 75.

== In popular culture ==
Clark was portrayed by Thomas Ian Griffith (under the modified name Doug Brister) in the television movie A Vision of Murder: The Story of Donielle. The film stars Melissa Gilbert as Donielle Patton, the real-life woman with supposed psychic capabilities who helped the police capture Clark. The movie was co-produced through director-producer Donald Wrye's SpyGaze Pictures company, who had bought the rights to the story from Patton. The film also co-stars Maria Conchita Alonso, Kim Hawthorne, and Rip Torn, and was shot in Vancouver, British Columbia during November and December 1999, before premiering on CBS in February 2000.

Max E. Williams plays Clark in the 2026 biopic Sunset Strip Killers, directed by Chad Ferrin, to be released on July 14.

The story was featured in Wicked Attraction, season 1, episode 13, "Death on the Sunset Strip" (2008).

== See also ==
- List of serial killers in the United States
- Lust murder
- William Bonin
