= Widow Smith's Station =

Overland Mail stagecoach stop in California

Coordinates: 34°36′51″N 118°25′39″W

Widow Smith's Station, also known as Major Gordon's Station and Clayton's Station, was a stagecoach station of the Butterfield Overland Mail 1st Division from 1858 to 1861 in southern California.

== Geography ==
The station was on the Stockton - Los Angeles Road in upper San Francisquito Canyon of the Sierra Pelona Mountains, 4 miles (6.4 km) southwest of Elizabeth Lake. It was located near San Francisquito Pass, about 1 mile (1.6 km) south of present-day Green Valley, at 38839 San Francisquito Canyon Road in northern Los Angeles County.

== History ==
A building may have existed here in the summer of 1856, when Harris Newmark said he stayed at Gordon's Station overnight when returning to Los Angeles from a business meeting at Fort Tejon. The final adobe station building was erected around 1859 by Aneas Gordon.

In October 1860, a correspondent of the Daily Alta California wrote an account of his travel by stage to Los Angeles from San Francisco. He mentions that the Butterfield Overland Mail (1857–1861) had a Clayton's Station operating at the former location of Widow Smith's Station.

King's Station was located 10 miles (16 km) south in lower San Francisquito Canyon. Mud Spring Station was 13 miles (21 km) north, in the western Antelope Valley.

After 1861 the station was used by other long haul stagecoach lines until the advent of the railroad ended them.

== Documentation ==
In 1929, a photograph and reference to the station were included in an article titled "In Pursuit of Vanished Days" by Marion Parks, published by the Historical Society of Southern California.

=== Historic American Buildings Survey (HABS) ===
In 1936 and 1937, identified as Major Gordon's Station, it was photographed and surveyed by the Historic American Buildings Survey (HABS). It was unoccupied, neglected, and being used for storage of grain and farm products at that time. Detailed drawings of the site, floor plan, and north, south, east, and west building elevation drawings were made.

Construction of the building dating from 1859, is described in the floor plan:

"Foundations are of field stone laid in adobe mortar. Walls are adobe with some field stone mixed in. Walls plastered inside and out with a plastic adobe mixed with sand. Front or south gable wall over porch, lime plastered. All other outside walls heavily whitewashed.
Walls of rooms No. 1-3-4 whitewashed, walls of Room 2 papered. Ceilings and roof projections whitewashed. Doors sash and trim painted slate gray. Floors, including porch, are 1"x 6" matched pine flooring laid on 2"x4"s flat on ground.
Roof framing has not the appearance of being original material. Roofing is of redwood shakes recovered in 1933."

== Destruction ==
The adobe station building remained into the 1960s. It was destroyed and torn down by 1966.

== See also ==
- Butterfield Overland Mail in California
- San Francisquito Canyon
