= San Francisquito Pass =

Mountain pass over the Sierra Pelona in Los Angeles County, California, United States

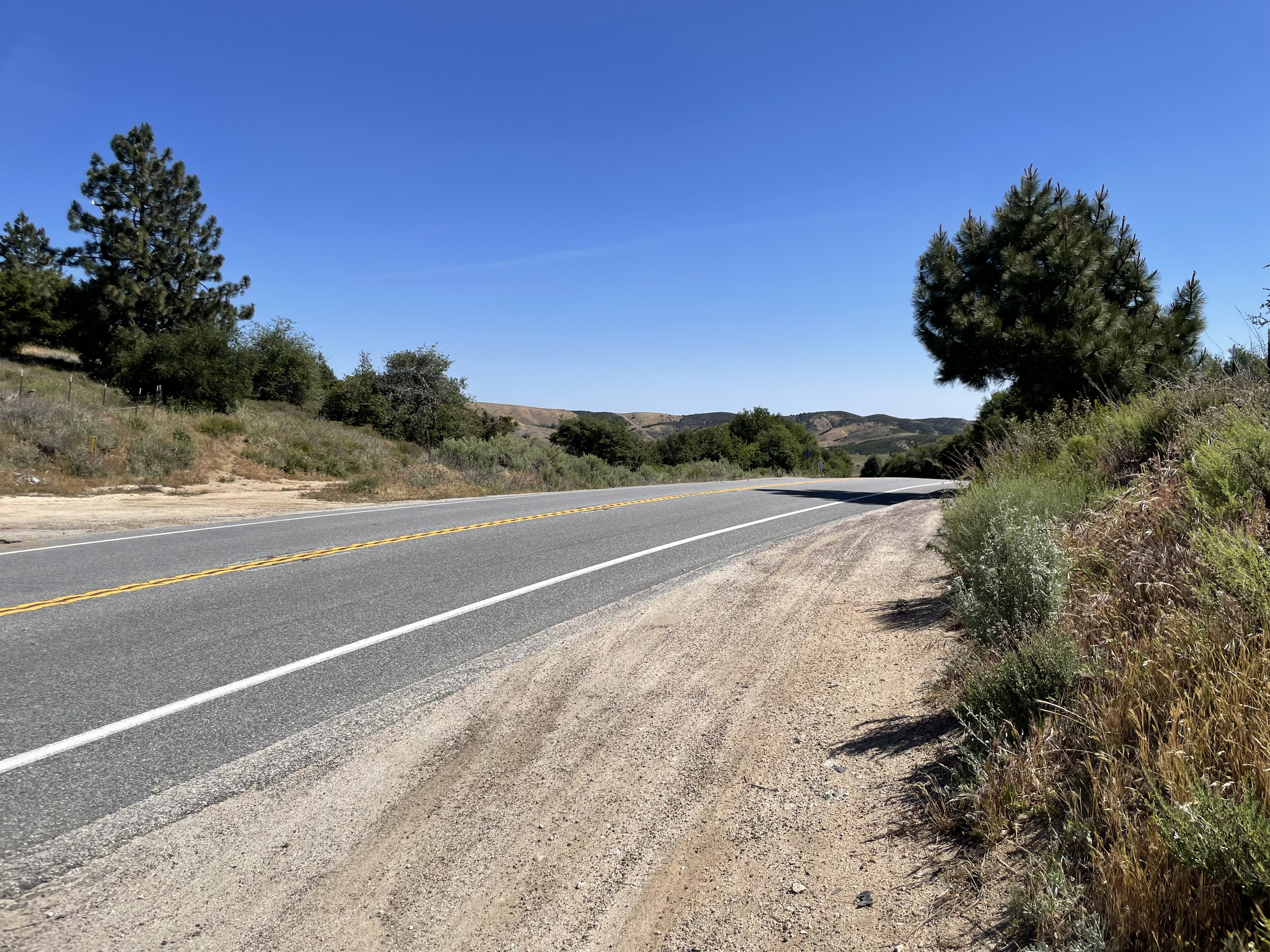
- San Francisquito Pass, looking north

- Location within the Los Angeles metropolitan area Location within California
- Elevation: 3,655 feet (1,114 m)
- Traversed by: San Francisquito Canyon Road

Third Approach
- Location: Los Angeles County, California
- Range: Sierra Pelona Mountains
- Coordinates: 34°38′22.74″N 118°22′50.34″W
- Topo map: Lake Hughes, CA

San Francisquito Pass is a mountain pass in the Sierra Pelona Mountains, located northeast of Green Valley and Santa Clarita, in northern Los Angeles County, California.

== Geography ==
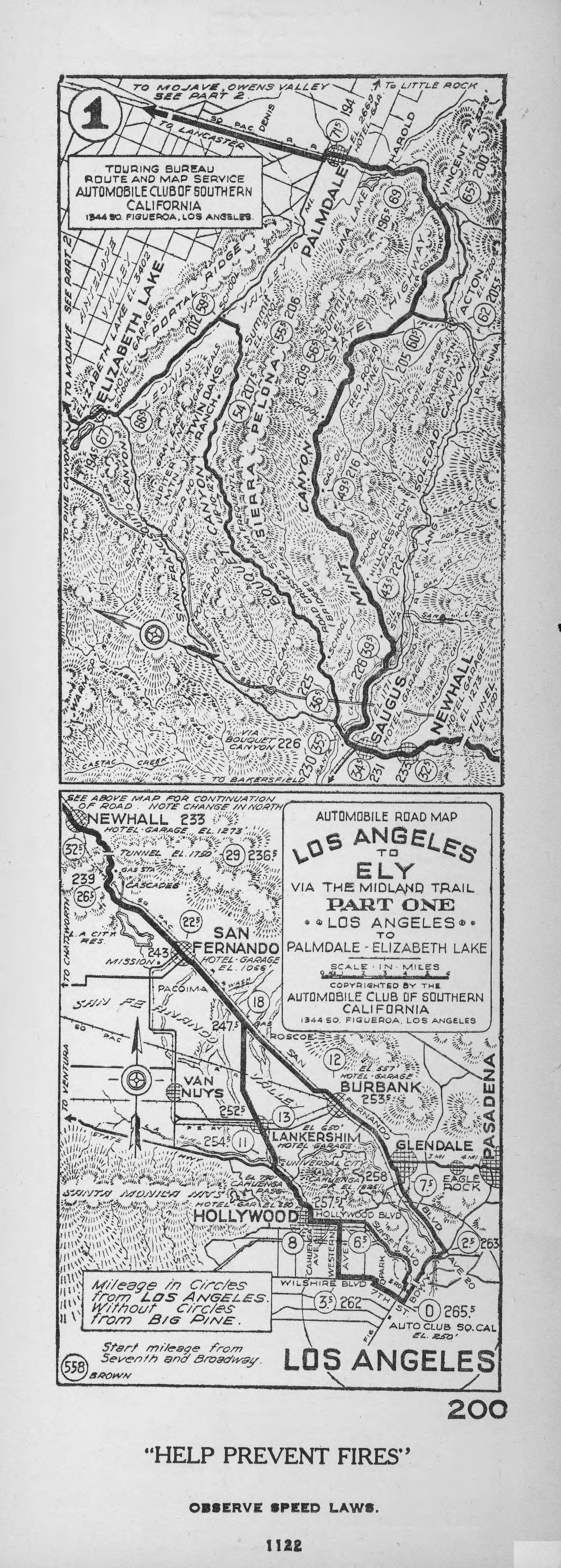
San Francisquito Pass on far left road, 1922 AAA map.

The pass, at the elevation 3,655 feet (1,114 m), is at the head of San Francisquito Canyon. San Francisquito Canyon Road, crossing over the Sierra Pelonas here, leads to Elizabeth Lake in the Leona Valley to the north, and Saugus to the south.

== History ==
San Francisquito Pass was on the El Camino Viejo, an alternate land route to the El Camino Real for reaching northern Spanish and Mexican colonial Alta California. It connected the Pueblo of Los Angeles and San Fernando Valley with the San Joaquin Valley. The El Camino Viejo horse and wagon trail next crossed the Tehachapi Mountains into the San Joaquin Valley at Old Tejón Pass.

The route's successor, the Stockton - Los Angeles Road, used San Francisquito Pass and Fort Tejon Pass (west of Old Tejón Pass). The Butterfield Overland Mail route (1857-1861) followed the Stockton—Los Angeles Road between the San Fernando and San Joaquin Valleys, and used both passes. It had a stagecoach stops at King's Station (southern canyon) and Widow Smith's Station (near pass) in San Francisquito Canyon.

San Francisquito Pass was used by the major inland north-south routes until the opening of the Ridge Route in 1915.

== Present day ==
The pass continues to be used by San Francisquito Canyon Road, which crosses it for local and scenic use in the present day. The pass and a section of the road are within the northwestern Angeles National Forest.

Los Angeles County realigned most of the upper part of San Francisquito Canyon Road in the 2000s. The original narrowest and curviest segment remains. The bypassed old section is a hiking route along San Francisquito Creek, passing through the historic St. Francis Dam site and ruins.

== See also ==
- Butterfield Overland Mail in California
- San Andreas Rift — Leona Valley
- San Francisquito Canyon
