= Dry Canyon Reservoir =

Reservoir in Santa Clarita, California

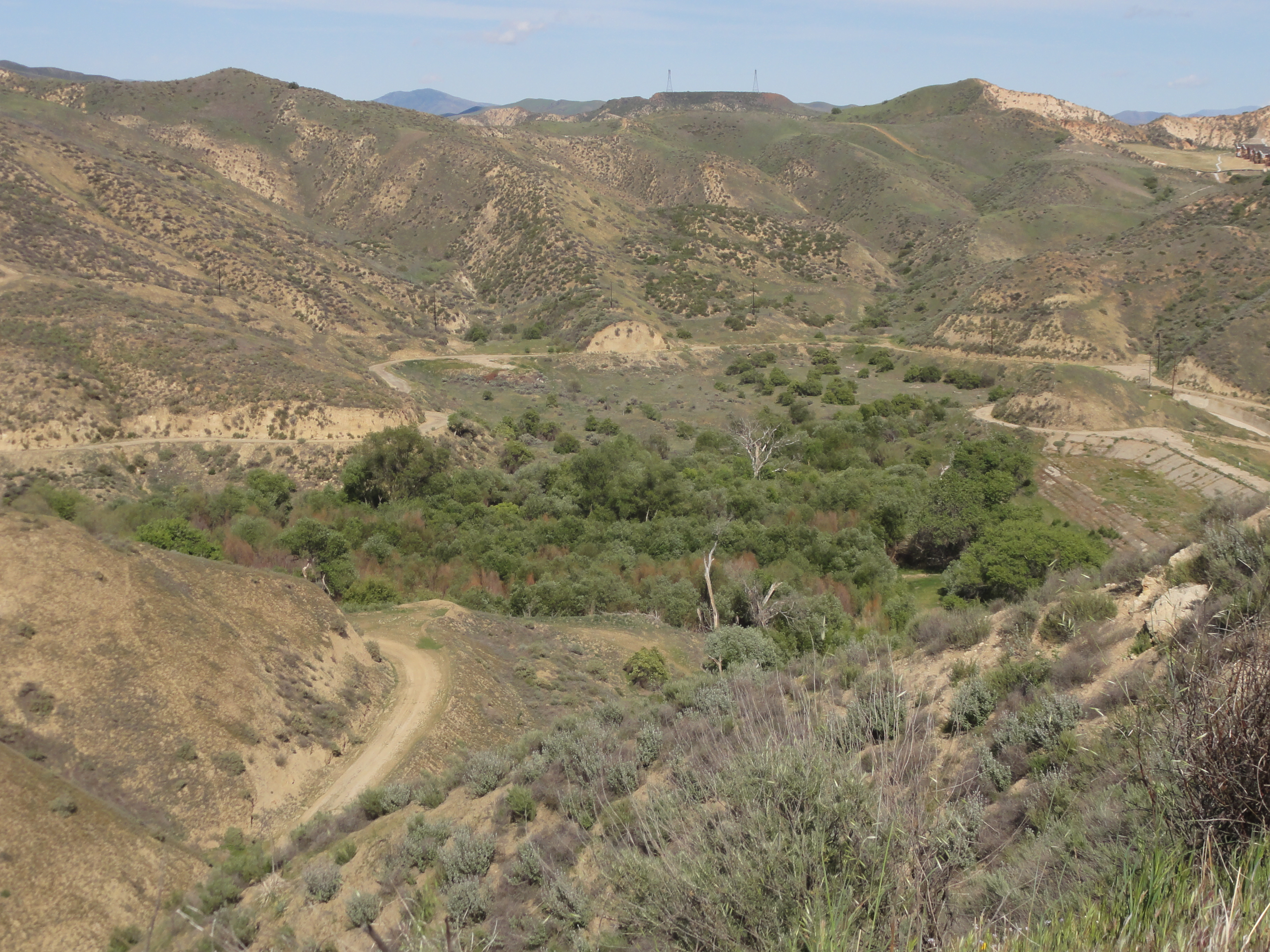

- Location within Santa Clarita Location within the Los Angeles metropolitan area Location within California
- Location: Santa Clarita Valley, Los Angeles County, California
- Coordinates: 34.4845°N 118.5290°W
- Type: Reservoir
- Primary inflows: Los Angeles Aqueduct; Dry Canyon Creek
- Primary outflows: Los Angeles Aqueduct; Dry Canyon Creek
- Max. length: 780 feet (240 m)
- Water volume: 72,750 ft^{3} (2,060 m^{3})
- Surface elevation: 1,455 feet (443 m)
- Islands: None
- Settlements: Santa Clarita

Dry Canyon Reservoir is a small reservoir formed by an embankment dam on Dry Canyon Creek in the foothills of the Sierra Pelona Mountains of northern Los Angeles County, California, just north of the city of Santa Clarita. It was designed as a part of the Los Angeles Aqueduct system.

== History ==
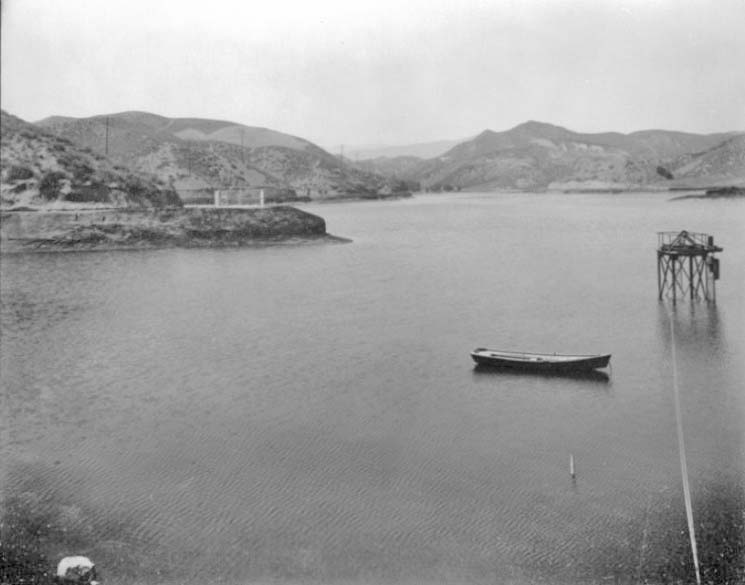
Looking north across the reservoir when filled with water. Photo taken before 1936.

Constructed from 1910 to 1912, the 72,750 ft^{3} (2,060 m^{3}) lake with a surface elevation of approximately 1,514 feet (461 m) above sea level regulated the flow of water from the irregular flow discharged from the power plants in San Francisquito Canyon. The incoming water from San Francisquito came from Tunnel 77 and the outgoing water went out Tunnel 78. Water from the lake was distributed via the Los Angeles Aqueduct to the northern portion of the Greater Los Angeles Area.

=== Draining the Reservoir ===
Following damages incurred by the dam itself during the 1952 Kern County earthquake and growing concerns over its structural integrity, the reservoir was drained in 1966. Since the early 1970s, efforts had been made to refill the reservoir but these plans have since been abandoned due to high costs. In the decades that followed, the suburban communities of Santa Clarita had grown northward to fill the narrow valley just downstream. The course of Dry Canyon Creek south of the reservoir was then funneled down a concrete wash to prevent flooding of the surrounding communities.

== See also ==
- List of dams and reservoirs in California
- List of lakes in California
- St. Francis Dam
- Bouquet Reservoir
- Castaic Lake
- Dry Canyon Formation
