= Bouquet Reservoir =

Reservoir in the Sierra Pelona of Los Angeles County, California, United States

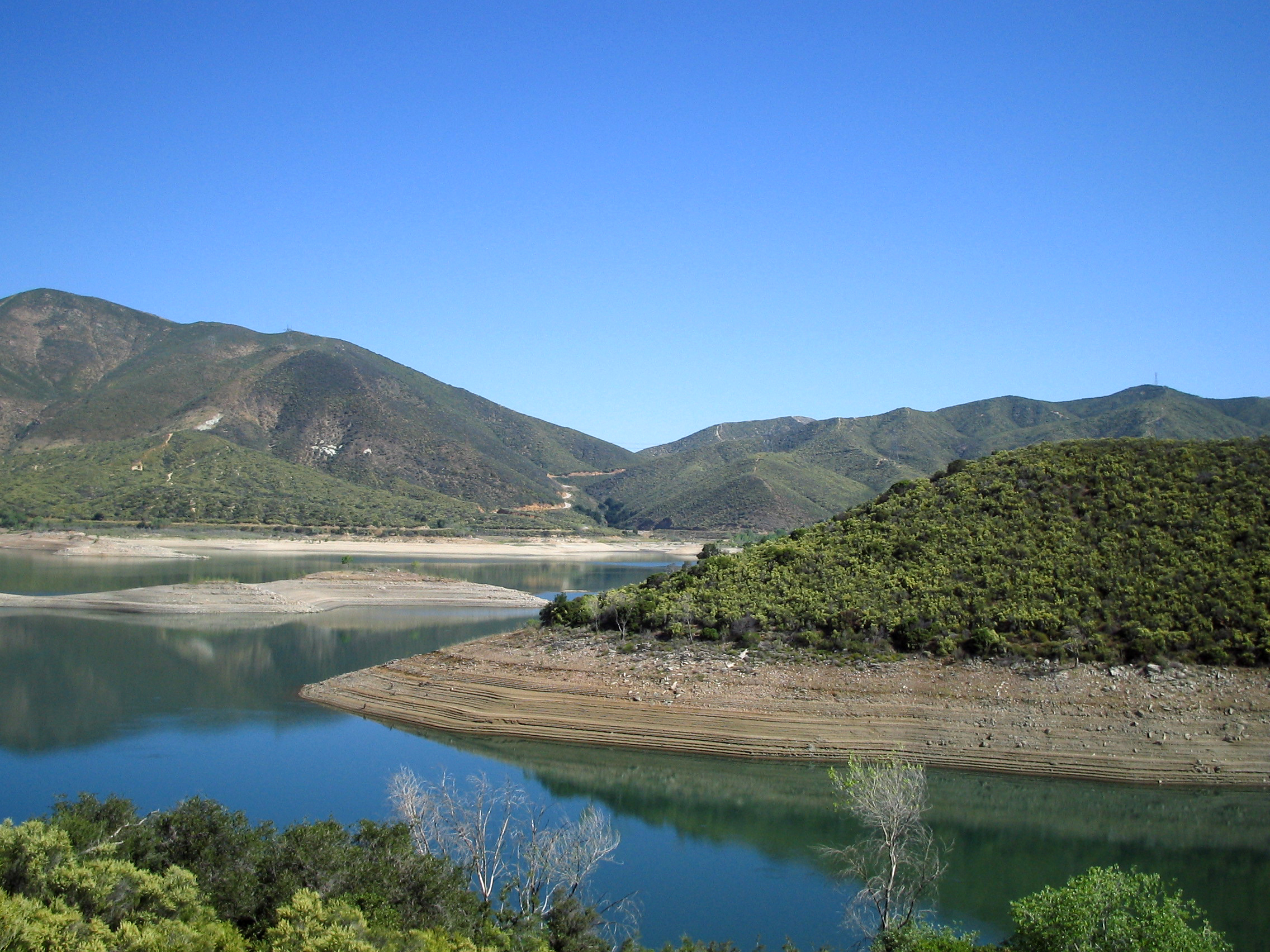

- Location within the Los Angeles metropolitan area Location within California
- Location: Angeles National Forest; Los Angeles County, California
- Coordinates: 34.5819°N 118.3799°W
- Lake type: Reservoir
- Primary inflows: Bouquet Creek; Los Angeles Aqueduct
- Primary outflows: Bouquet Creek
- Catchment area: 13.6 sq mi (35 km^{2})
- Basin countries: United States
- Max. length: 1.5 km (0.93 mi)
- Max. width: 3 km (1.9 mi)
- Surface area: 628 acres (254 ha)
- Water volume: 36,500 acre⋅ft (45,000,000 m^{3})
- Surface elevation: 915 m (3,002 ft)
- References: U.S. Geological Survey Geographic Names Information System: Bouquet Reservoir

Bouquet Reservoir is an artificial lake in the Angeles National Forest of Los Angeles County, California about 15 miles (24 km) west from Palmdale.

At elevation of 2,993 feet (912 m) in the Sierra Pelona Mountains, the reservoir capacity is 36,500 acre⋅ft (45,000,000 m^{3}) and is formed by Bouquet Canyon Dam on Bouquet Creek, which is a tributary of the Santa Clara River. The dam is constructed of earthfill and is 190 feet (58 m) tall, measured from the elevation of the original streambed.

The dam was built by the city of Los Angeles and was completed in 1934 (92 years ago) Official opening ceremonies were held at noon on March 28, 1934. The reservoir is part of the Los Angeles Aqueduct system, which is where it gets much of its water. Both are owned by the Los Angeles Department of Water and Power. The reservoir's drainage basin is only 13.6 square miles (35 km^{2}) where the average annual rainfall is 14–20 inches (360–510 mm). Its purpose is to provide regulation of releases and to store water in case there is an interruption upstream.

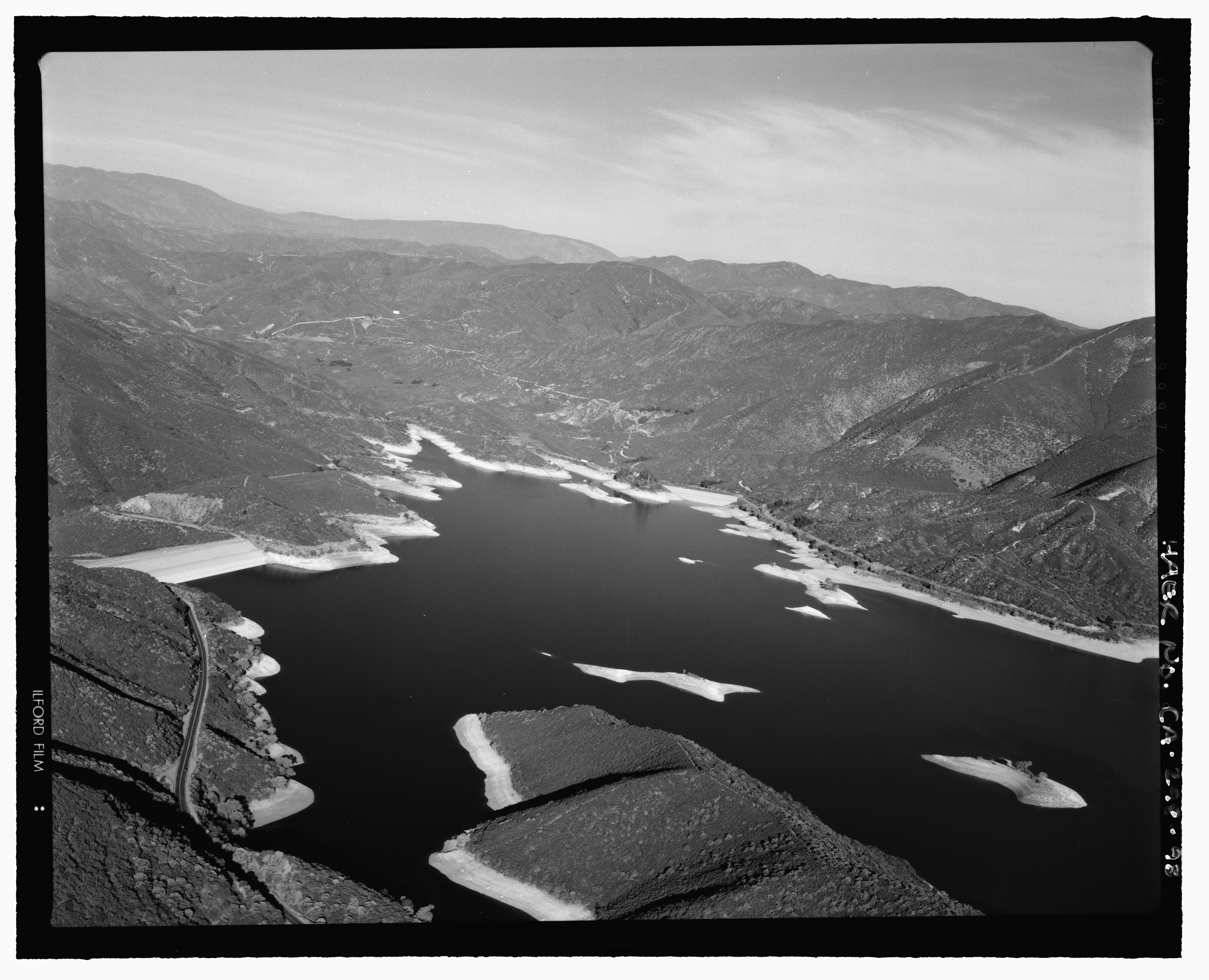
Looking west over reservoir

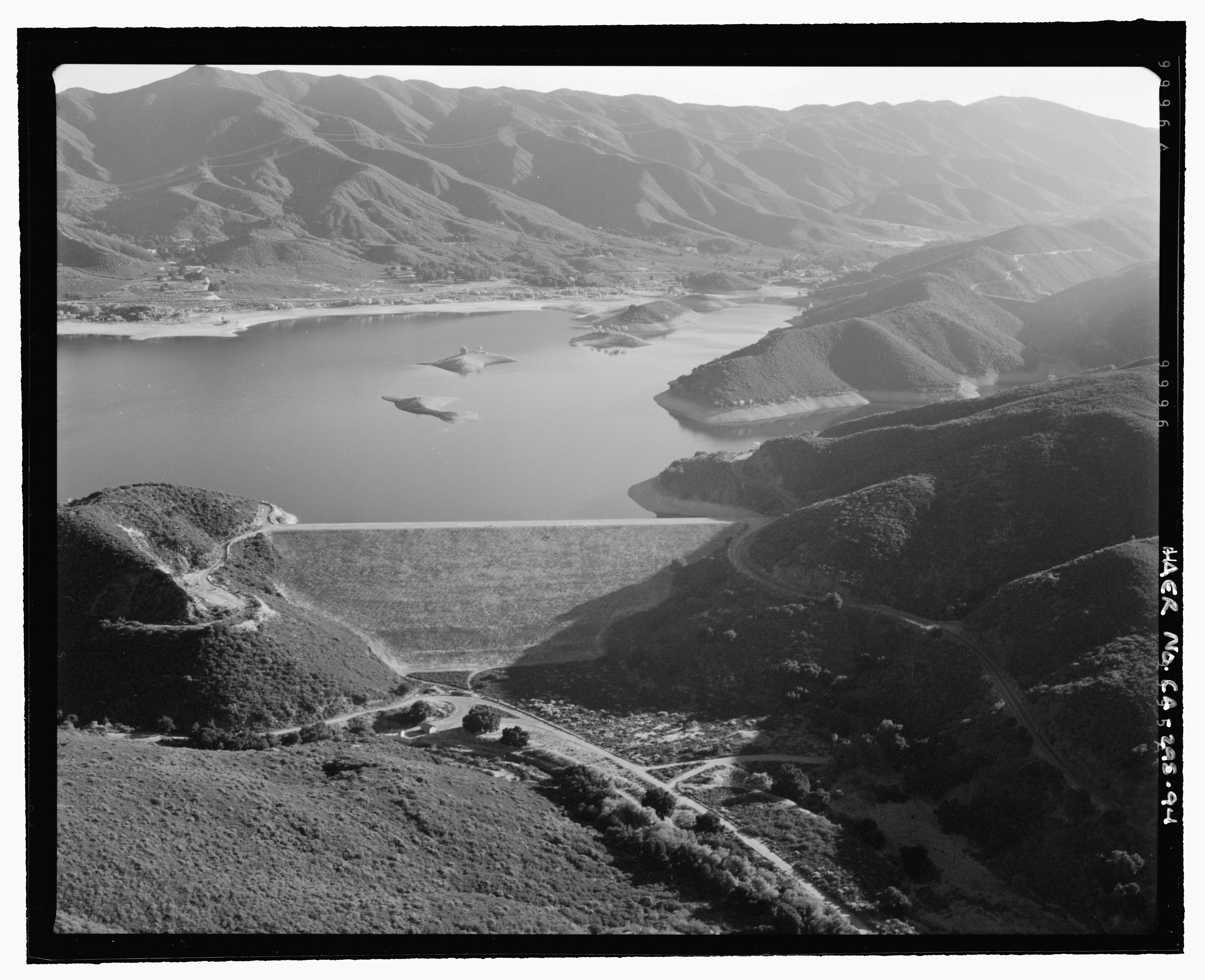
Looking east over reservoir

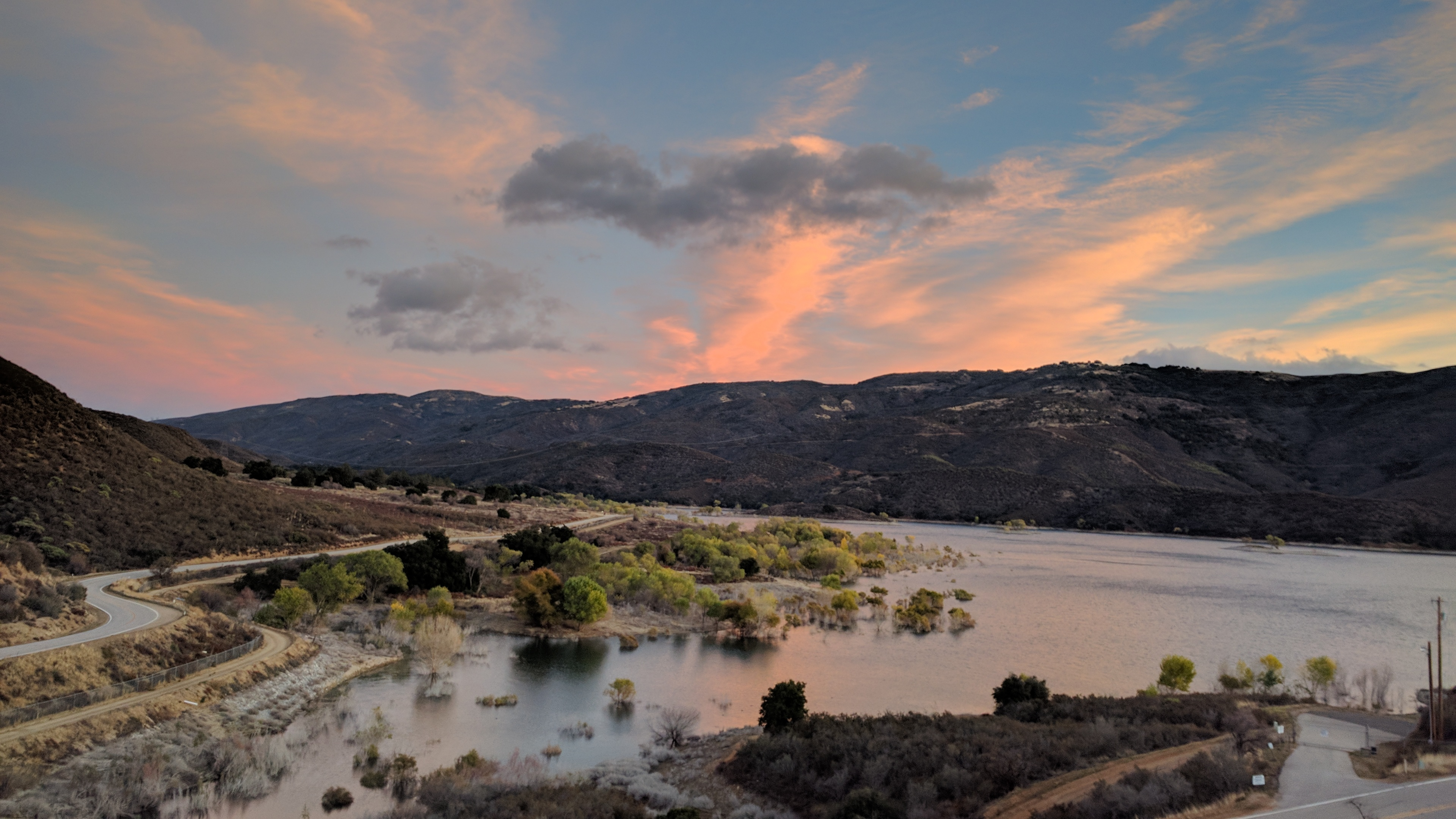

== See also ==
- List of lakes in California
- List of dams and reservoirs in California
- Castaic Lake
- Dry Canyon Reservoir
