= Santa Clara River (California) =

River in Ventura and Los Angeles counties, California

Santa Clara River Rio de Santa Clara
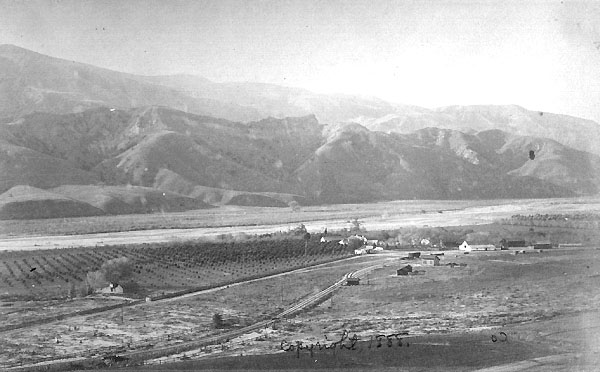
- View of Santa Clara River with Rancho Camulos in the foreground, 1888

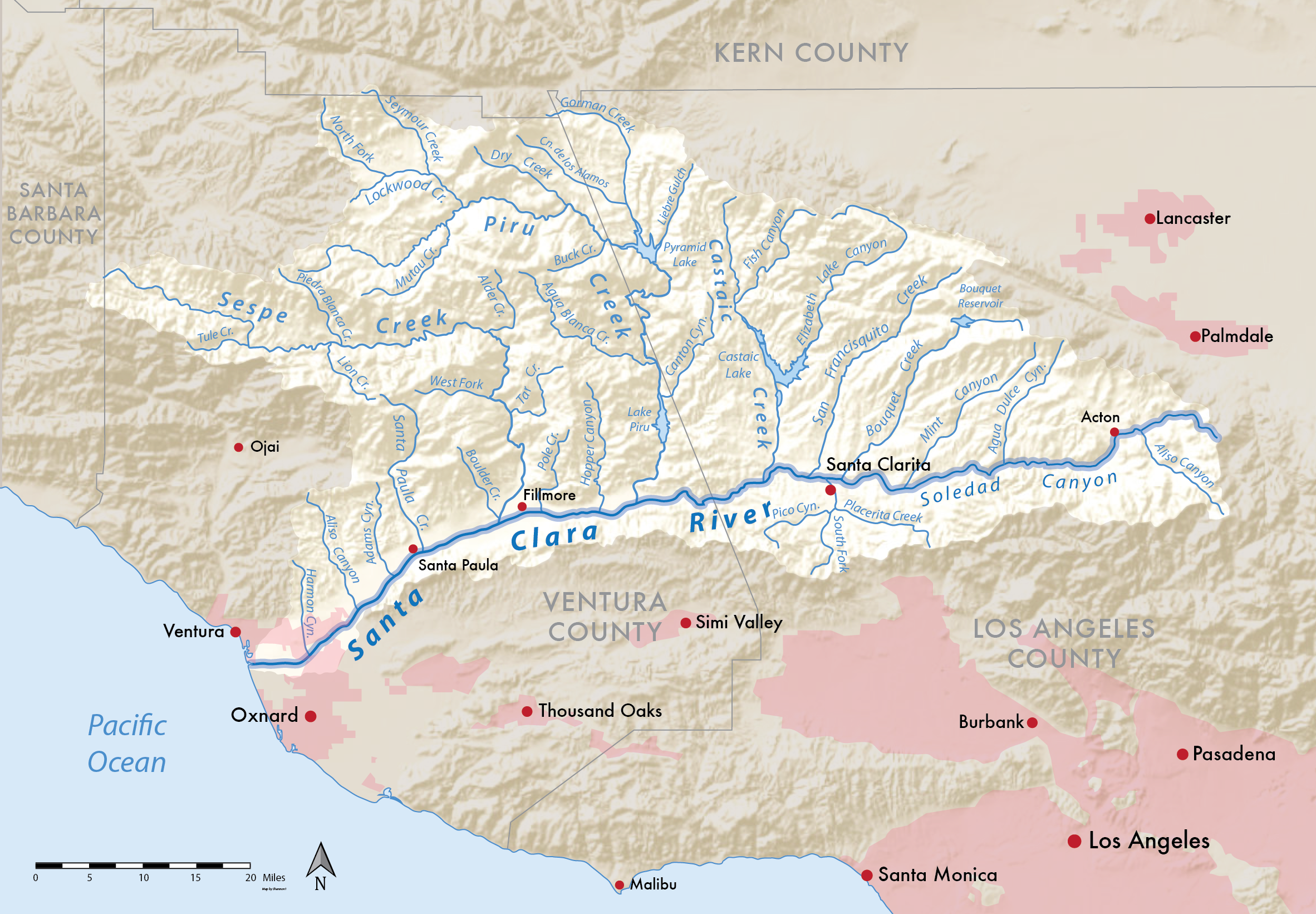
- Map of the Santa Clara River watershed

- Location of the mouth of the Santa Clara River in California
- Native name: Río Santa Clara (Spanish)

Location
- Country: United States
- State: California
- Counties: Los Angeles, Ventura
- Cities: Oxnard, Ventura, Santa Paula, Fillmore, Santa Clarita

Physical characteristics
- Source: San Gabriel Mountains
  - location: Aliso Canyon, Angeles National Forest, Los Angeles County
  - coordinates: 34°26′01″N 118°21′51″W
  - elevation: 5,800 ft (1,800 m)
- Mouth: Pacific Ocean
  - location: Between Ventura and Oxnard, Ventura County
  - coordinates: 34°14′07″N 119°15′49″W
  - elevation: 0 ft (0 m)
- Length: 83 mi (134 km)
- Basin size: 1,600 sq mi (4,100 km^{2})
- Discharge
  - location: Ventura
  - average: 176 cu ft/s (5.0 m^{3}/s)
  - minimum: 0 cu ft/s (0 m^{3}/s) (Note: The river is heavily dependent on seasonal rains, so its flow is often zero.)
  - maximum: 165,000 cu ft/s (4,700 m^{3}/s)

Basin features
- Tributaries
  - right: San Francisquito Creek, Castaic Creek, Piru Creek, Sespe Creek

The Santa Clara River (Spanish: Río Santa Clara) is an 83 mi (134 km) long river in Ventura and Los Angeles counties in Southern California. It drains parts of four ranges in the Transverse Ranges System north and northwest of Los Angeles, then flows west onto the Oxnard Plain and into the Santa Barbara Channel of the Pacific Ocean.

The watershed has provided habitat for a wide array of native plants and animals and has historically supplied humans with water, fish, and fertile farmland. The northern portion of the watershed was home to the Tataviam people while the southern portion was occupied by the Chumash people. Much of the Santa Clara River Valley is used for agriculture which has limited the use of structural levees to separate the natural floodplain from the river. Although it is one of the least altered rivers in Southern California, some levees exist where the river flows through areas of significant urban development.

== History ==
The Santa Clara River was originally named the Río de Santa Clara on August 9, 1769, by the Portolá expedition on the march north from San Diego to found a mission at Monterey, to honor Saint Clare of Assisi who died on August 11, 1253. The Santa Clara River Valley was then known as the Cañada de Santa Clara.

The Santa Clara-Mojave River Ranger District of the Angeles National Forest is named after the Santa Clara River.

=== Floods ===
The failure and near complete collapse of the St. Francis Dam took place in the middle of the night on March 12, 1928. The dam was holding a full reservoir of 12.4×10^{9} US gal (4.7×10^{10} L) of water that surged down San Francisquito Canyon and emptied into the river.

== Course ==
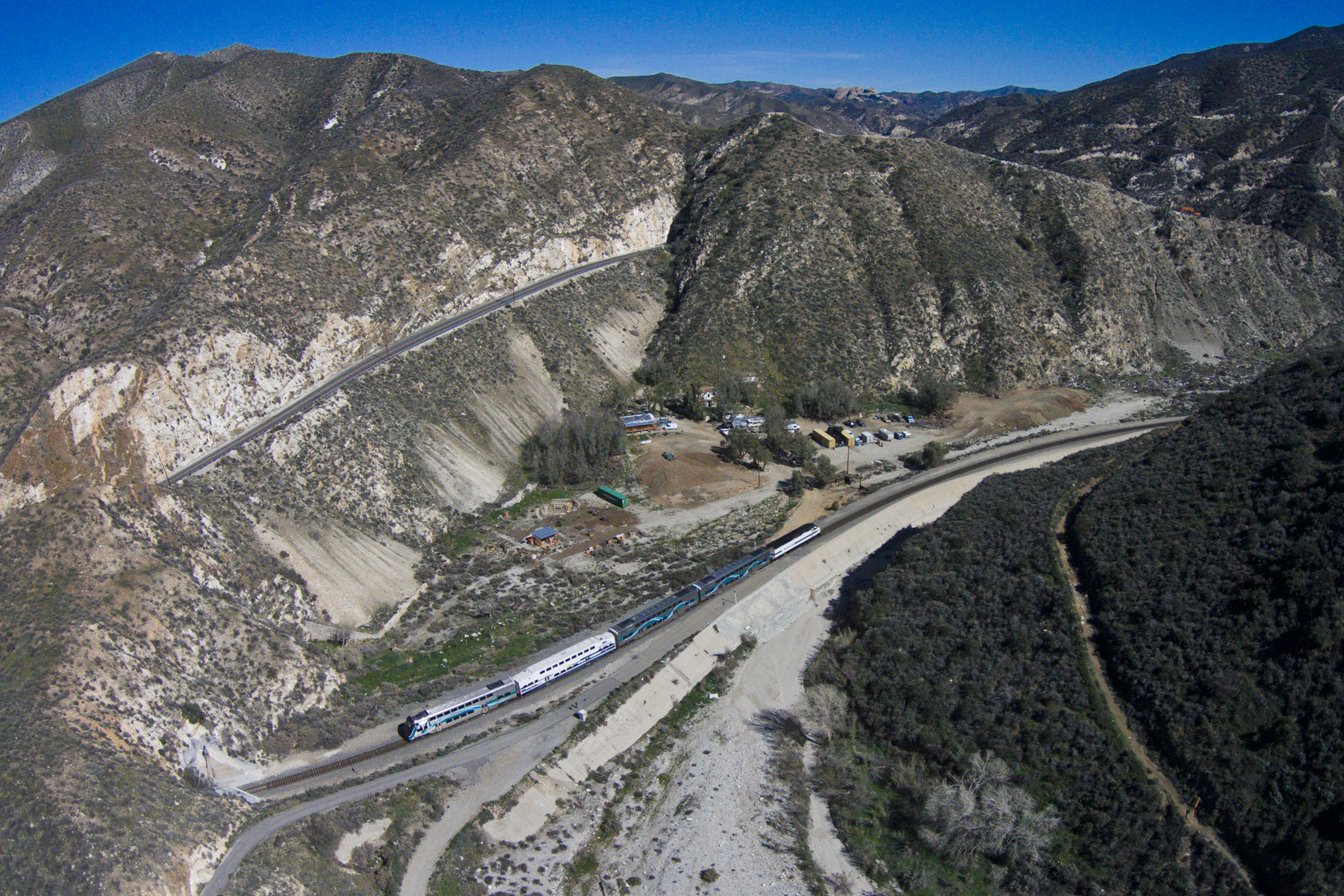
Aerial view of the Santa Clara River as it winds through Soledad Canyon just east of Santa Clarita

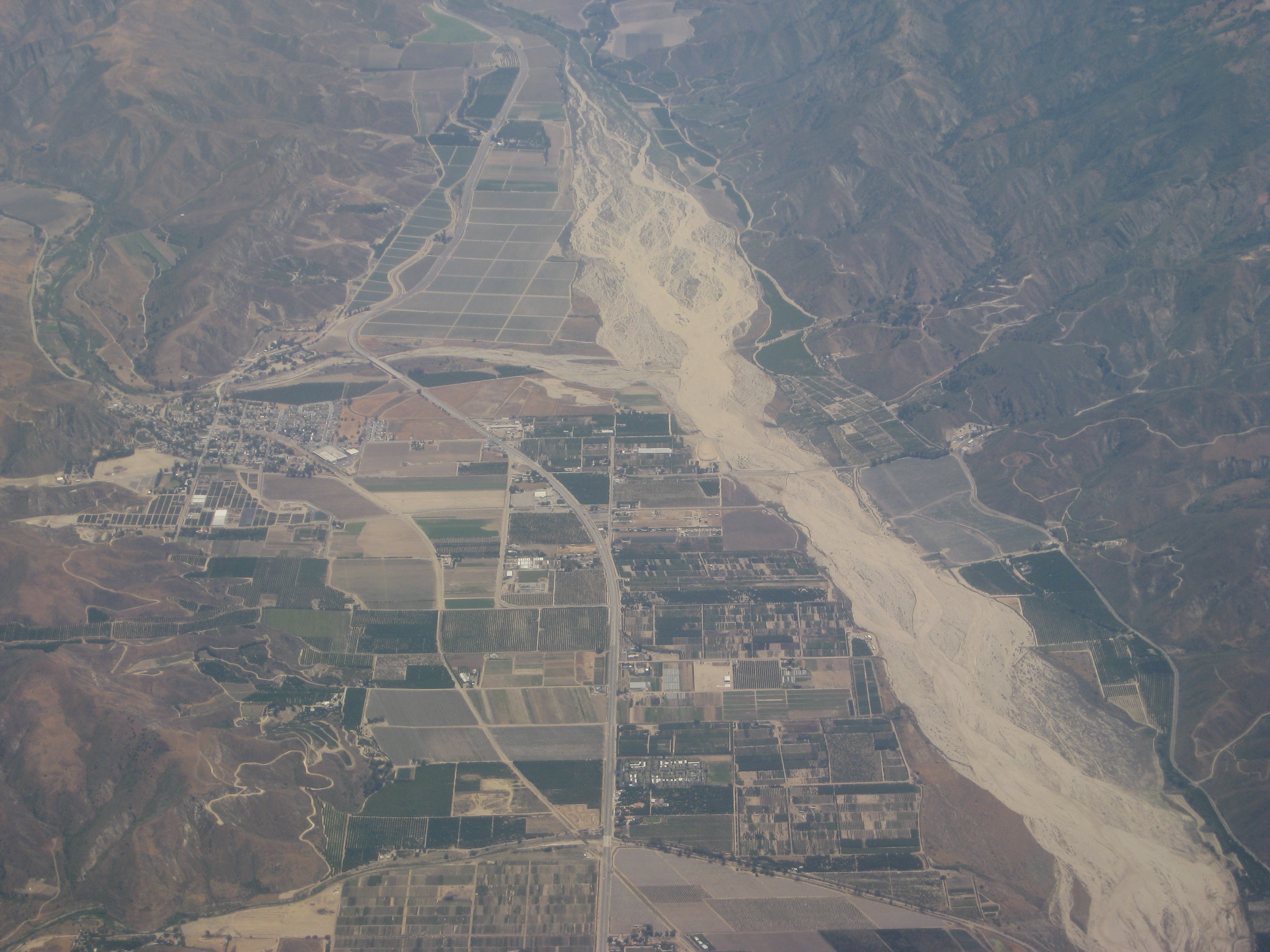
Aerial view of the Santa Clara River at Piru

The Santa Clara River's headwaters take drainage from the northern slopes of the San Gabriel Mountains near the Angeles Forest Highway, inside the western part of the Angeles National Forest. Its largest fork, Aliso Canyon, is about 7 mi (11 km) long and forms the primary headstream. These branches combine into the broad wash of the main stem near the town of Acton which flows west through Soledad Canyon, crossing under California State Route 14 near the town of Canyon Country. The Sierra Pelona Mountains on the north provide additional watershed and seasonal tributaries. The river receives Bouquet Creek, Placerita Creek, and San Francisquito Creek within the City of Santa Clarita. The riverbed surface remains dry most of the year here, except on extreme occasions of heavier than average rainfall. The river then crosses west under Interstate 5 and receives Castaic Creek from the right.

After the Castaic Creek confluence, the river starts to flow primarily southwest through the Santa Clarita Valley. Near the county line between Los Angeles County and Ventura County, the river enters the Santa Clara River Valley flowing past Buckhorn and Fillmore, incorporating additional flow from Piru Creek and Sespe Creek, both from the right, and Santa Paula Creek at the town of Santa Paula, where it passes the large South Mountain Oil Field on the south bank. The Santa Clara River then bends southwest, passing the Saticoy Oil Field on the north bank where South Mountain marks its entrance onto the broad Oxnard Plain. The river ends at the Pacific Ocean after flowing across the north side of this plain made fertile with the silt deposited by the river. A sand bar usually stands across the mouth at the Santa Clara Estuary Natural Preserve that lies within McGrath State Beach in Oxnard and bounded on the north by the city of Ventura wastewater treatment plant.

== Watershed ==
Although located just north of the heavily populated Los Angeles Basin, the 1,600 mi^{2} (4,100 km^{2}) Santa Clara River watershed remains one of the most natural on the South Coast. It is separated from the Los Angeles Basin by the low Santa Susana Mountains, along the north side of which the Santa Clara River runs. On the east are the San Gabriel Mountains, and on the north are the Santa Ynez Mountains, Sespe Mountains, San Cayetano Mountains, and Tehachapi Mountains. Piru, Castaic and Sespe Creeks, each over 50 mi (80 km) long, are the primary tributaries of the Santa Clara River. While Piru and Castaic Creeks form reservoirs for the California State Water Project (Pyramid Lake and Lake Piru on Piru Creek, and Elderberry Forebay and Castaic Lake on Castaic Creek), Sespe Creek is designated a National Wild and Scenic River, unique among Southern California streams. There are 57 archaeological sites and 12 historical landmarks in the watershed.

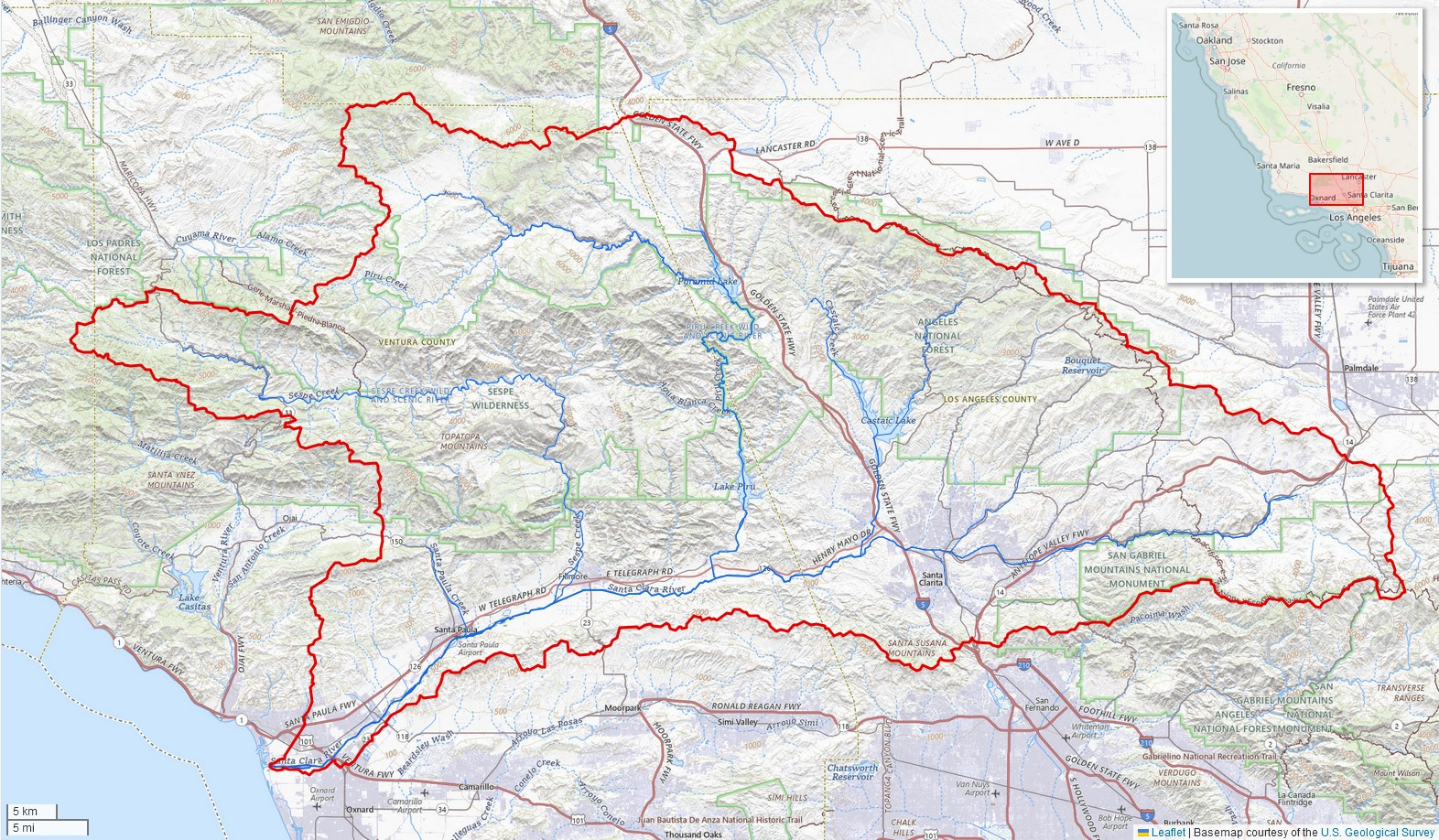
Santa Clara River watershed (Interactive map)

The Santa Clara River watershed borders on the Ventura River/Matilija Creek watershed on the west. On the northwest lies the Santa Ynez River watershed. On the north is the interior drainage basin of Tulare Lake in the Central Valley. To the east is the Mojave River and to the south is the Los Angeles River. The Santa Clara River is the second largest river in Southern California; the larger one is the Santa Ana River.

== Estuary ==
The estuary has been modified by human activities at least since 1855. By the late 1920s roads and agricultural fields had become established. In the late 1950s the former delta area was occupied by the Ventura Water Reclamation Facility and agricultural fields with levees constraining the river from these areas and directing the flow to the Harbor Boulevard bridge. McGrath State Beach was established in 1948. The estuary has been designated a Natural Preserve within McGrath State Beach on the south bank of the river mouth.

From the north bank of the river, the city of Ventura releases some 9,000,000 US gal (34,000,000 L; 7,500,000 imp gal) of treated effluent daily that flows into the Santa Clara Estuary Natural Preserve from their water reclamation facility (VWRF). A sand berm separates the river from the ocean most of the year. In years with adequate rainfall, the river breaks the berm which is then slowly rebuilt by ocean action through the rest of the year. When the river watershed has an exceptionally dry year, the berm acts as a dam, allowing the water level to rise with the discharge. In August 2014, with the frequent flooding of the access road and many of the campsites in the state park, a report found that the park had only been open five of the past eighteen months because of repeated flooding. When the berm is broken when it is not raining, fish can become stranded in the sudden draining of the estuary waters.

The estuary was identified on the 1998, 2002 and 2006 Clean Water Act 303(d) lists of impaired water bodies. In 2012, the Los Angeles Regional Water Quality Control Board required the Counties of Ventura and Los Angeles together with cities along the river to limit the total maximum daily load of bacteria potentially harmful to human health that discharges from stormwater outfalls into the Santa Clara River, primarily during the dry season. Sources of bacteria of concern in urban runoff from the county, City of Fillmore, City of Oxnard, City of Santa Clarita, City of Santa Paula, and City of Ventura include pet and animal wastes, sanitary sewer overflows, and organic debris such as leaves and grass. Examples of ways they will improve water quality include increased frequencies of street sweeping and stormwater catch basin cleaning; field surveys to locate and eliminate both dry season street runoff and leaks from the sanitary sewer systems; and enhanced public education.

== Ecology ==
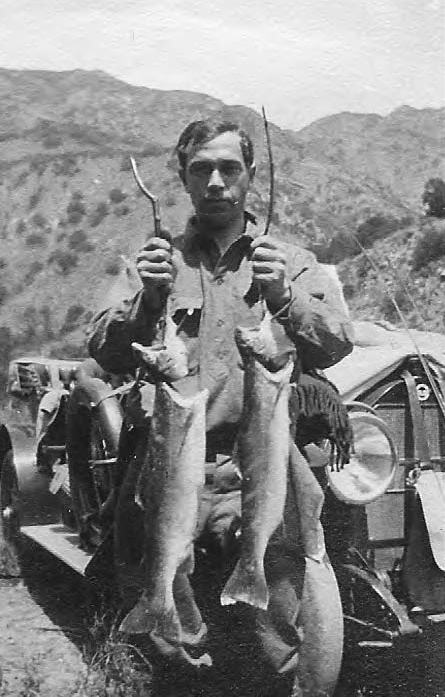
Fisherman with catch of steelhead in lower Sespe Creek, 1911

The river is habitat for threatened species such as the unarmored three-spined stickleback, steelhead, southwestern pond turtle, and least Bell's vireo. The endemic, endangered Santa Ana sucker (Catostomus santaanae) lives in parts of the Santa Clara River system.

Historic documentation of an important recreational steelhead trout (Oncorhynchus mykiss) fishery occurs for the Santa Clara River into the mid-1900s. The steelhead trout run on the Santa Clara river prior to 1940 is estimated to have had thousands of fish and to have been one of the largest steelhead runs in southern California. Construction of the Vern Freeman Diversion Dam and other migration barriers on the mainstem, Santa Paula Creek, Sespe Creek, Piru Creek, and other tributaries during the mid-1900s appear to be correlated with the demise of the steelhead run as habitat availability decreased and surface flows decreased. Adult steelhead still try to migrate up the river with an adult trapped at the Vern Freeman Dam in 2001. A wild rainbow trout population still exists in the headwaters of the Santa Paula, Sespe, Hopper, and Piru Creek tributaries and is producing out-migrating steelhead smolts bound for the Pacific. However, challenges to outgoing smolt migration include low to no stream flows downstream of the dam or predation in the coastal estuary. Lampreys, a parasite, also impact the steelhead. Invasive species such as Arundo donax also create changes that are not favorable to spawning trout. Genetic analysis of the steelhead in the Santa Clara River watershed has shown them to be of native and not hatchery stocks.

There were beaver (Castor canadensis) historically in the Santa Clara River until Europeans arrived, according to oral Ventureño history taken by ethnolinguist John Peabody Harrington in the early twentieth century. The full reference is: "The beaver comes and gnaws the tree on the side towards which it leans, and at last falls over. The tree is leaning towards our house. I am beginning to fear that it will fall on us. The beaver builds its house in the river or the cienegas in the time of our ancestors. There were beavers at Ventura and also at Saticoy." This historical observer record is consistent with a beaver skull collected in 1906 in the Sespe Creek tributary by Dr. John Hornung, a zoologist at the Los Angeles Museum of Natural History.

Pronghorn antelope (Antilocapra americana) used to roam along the Santa Clara River, as Father Pedro Font, describe in his diary on the de Anza Expedition February 1776, "We saw in the plain a very large drove of antelopes which, as soon as they saw us, fled like the wind, looking like a cloud skimming along the earth." There is a Ventureño word for antelope, q'aq, which is different from their separate words for deer and elk.

In 2002, eight Southwest willow flycatchers hatched in the Hedrick Ranch Nature Area (HRNA), a 220 acres (89 ha) preserve just east of Santa Paula managed by the Friends of Santa Clara River. The first SWFs to hatch on the river in recent times was at the Fillmore Fish Hatchery in 2000.

Quagga mussels were discovered in Lake Piru in 2013. They are an invasive species found in rivers and lakes in the U.S.

== River modifications ==
=== In Ventura County ===
The Harbor Boulevard bridge, the most westerly crossing, marks the upstream boundary of McGrath State Beach and the Ventura Water Reclamation Facility while the estuary continues a little farther upstream. In 1969 the river breached the north bank, flowed through an area that had historical been part of the estuary, flooded a new golf course and Harbor Boulevard, and deposited silt and debris into recently completed Ventura Harbor just upcoast from the reclamation facility.

Over the years, many communities have used the river banks as dumps to create levees that would keep the river from flooding adjacent lands during occasional years with heavy winter rains. Three dump sites about 2 mi (3.2 km) upstream from the mouth came under the control of the Ventura Regional Sanitation District by 1988. The district used the landfill gases to produce electricity until 2001. As the landfill aged and its contents decomposed, the release of gas became intermittent and the gases from the recovery system are burned off in a flare. The defunct power plant was built just upstream of the Victoria Avenue bridge, the second crossing upstream from the ocean.

The riverbed was mined extensively for sand and gravel throughout the post–World War II building boom for the construction of homes and highways. Mining the riverbed for sand and gravel impacts the riparian zones by destroying habitat and changes sediment flow regimes. The mining decreased significantly in the 1990s due to increased costs needed to satisfy environmental concerns and concerns that the removal of material increased scouring and undermining of bridge foundations and pipelines that crossed the river. As of 2010 there were still 3 active gravel operations in the upstream area.

There are also water diversions, most notably the Freeman Diversion Dam, located approximately 10.7 mi (17.2 km) from the ocean The United Water Conservation District, formed in 1950, battles groundwater overdraft through a combination of aquifer recharge and providing alternative surface water supplies. The District owns Lake Piru and key facilities along the Santa Clara River that are used to manage groundwater supplies. The district provides wholesale water delivery through three pipelines to various portions of the Oxnard Plain.

The Vern Freeman Diversion Dam, built by United Water in 1991 on the Santa Clara river, channels water to shallow basins designed to replenish the aquifer. For decades before the structure was built, earthen dams were constructed in the river to divert water to farmers and replenished the aquifer. The berms would have to be rebuilt whenever winter rains created a flow that breached the berms. Southern California Steelhead were declared endangered in 1997 and the fish ladder on the structure was deemed insufficient. The National Marine Fisheries Service determined in 2015 that fixing this was a high priority since it is the first structure the steelhead encounter when attempting to migrate from the ocean. A judge determined in 2018 that the federal Endangered Species Act had been violated by United Water by failing to ensure that the structure provided an adequate water supply and migratory passageway for steelhead.

==== Treated Wastewater ====
The Santa Paula Water Recycling Facility was built in 2010 for $63 million to treat the city sewage. Santa Paula Water, a partnership of two corporations, financed, built and operated the facility under the agreement with the city. The city purchased the facility for $70.8 million in 2015 to take control and end a dispute over the failure of the plant to sufficiently remove chlorides. Although the new plant used modern treatment methods, the treated wastewater contained contaminants called chlorides that must be removed under state law before being discharged into the Santa Clara River.

=== In Los Angeles County ===
The main channel of the Santa Clara River through the city of Santa Clarita remains largely natural, a variety of modifications have been made to the river and its major tributaries. The South Fork of the Santa Clara River features a system of 14 weirs that regulate the flow of the river through Newhall, Valencia, and Saugus. Bouquet Creek is channelized at the confluence of every minor creek that flows into it, most notably along a 0.4 mi (0.64 km) stretch of its riverbed near its confluence with the Santa Clara River.

The unincorporated community of Valencia is an under-construction, large scale master-planned community in Los Angeles County along the river in the easterly portion of the Santa Clarita Valley adjacent to Ventura County. The required permits for the project describe how the work will fill in and alter more than 82 acres (33 ha) of flood plain and tributaries. These include threatened and endangered fauna and flora, including the California condor, the California gnatcatcher, the southwestern willow flycatcher, the least Bell's vireo, the arroyo toad, the San Fernando Valley spineflower, and the threespine stickleback. The area is included in Los Angeles County's Strategic Ecological Areas program, which designates areas of "irreplaceable biological resources". The water reclamation plant serving the development will be near the boundary with Ventura County. The plant will treat an estimated 6,800,000 US gal (26,000,000 L; 5,700,000 imp gal) of water every day before releasing it into the river as it flows towards the ocean and into Ventura County.

During the decades the project on the Newhall Ranch has been in planning, it has faced legal actions and environmental concerns. The downstream impact and other effects also drew Ventura County officials and citizens into opposition to the project. The landmark California Environmental Quality Act (CEQA) used to challenge the development, may have led to a better-designed project while saving crucial habitat. In 2014, the California 2nd District Court of Appeal overturned a Los Angeles County Superior Court ruling and found that the environmental impact report adequately analyzed the project's potential impact on endangered fauna and flora and Native American cultural artifacts. The ruling also supported the agency's determination that storm-drain runoff from the project's 2,587 acres (1,047 ha) into the Santa Clara River would not harm juvenile steelhead trout downstream in Ventura County. Subsequently, the California Supreme Court agreed to review a petition that stated the appellate court opinion exempting developers from protections for the unarmored threespine stickleback would apply to other protected species such as the California Condor. the state Supreme Court directed lower courts to toss out the EIRs mentioned above for two phases of construction. After the EIRs had been toss out by the state Supreme Court in May 2016, changes were made to address the concerns. The California Department of Fish and Wildlife certified the environmental impact report in 2017. In July 2017, the Los Angeles County Board of Supervisors certified a revised environmental analysis and re-approved land-use permits for the Mission Village and Landmark Village communities.

== Restoration ==
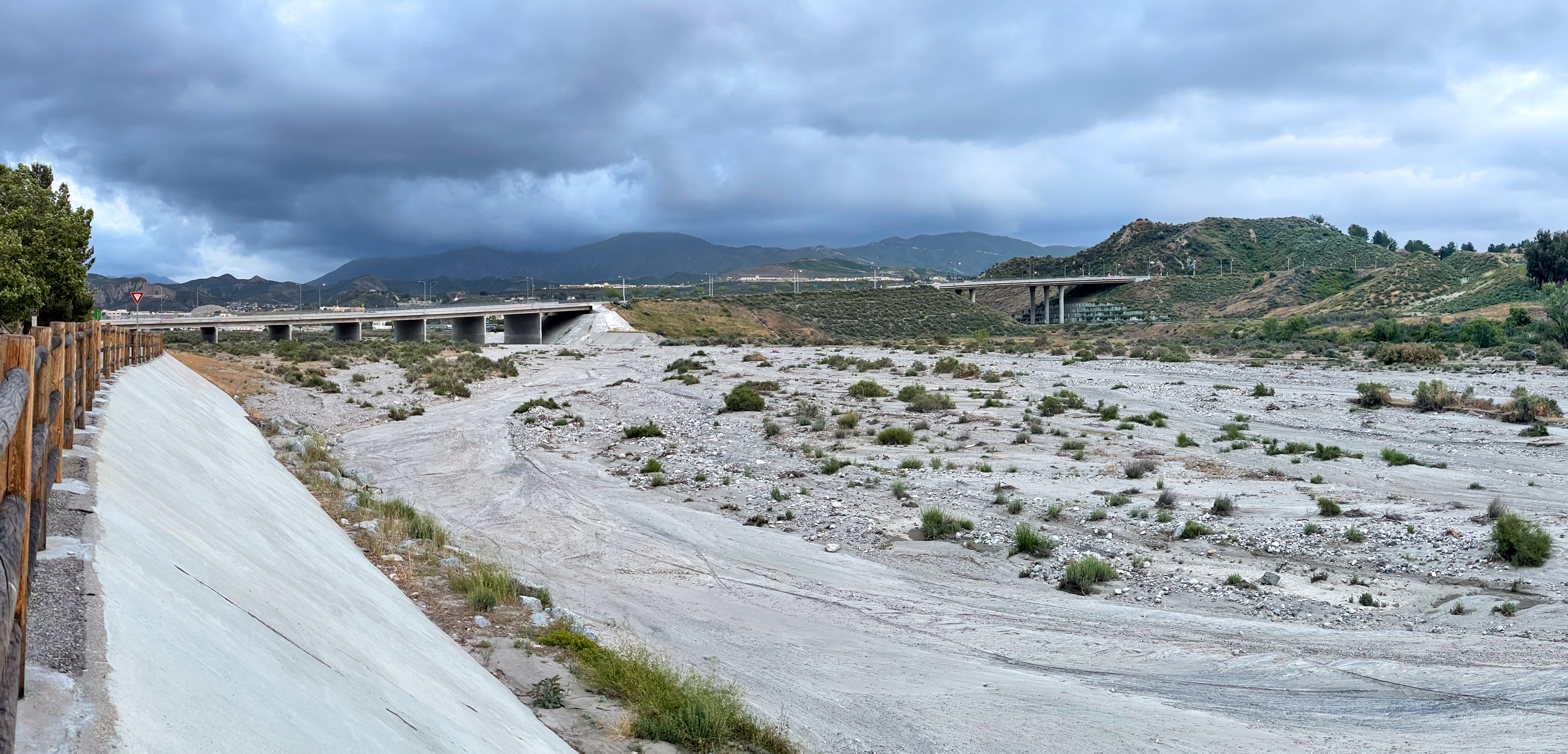
The Santa Clara River as it flows through the Canyon Country neighborhood of Santa Clarita

There has been significant interest in protecting and restoring the river habitat. The riparian natural areas that remain along the river are of interest to several conservancy organizations. Easements are obtained that allow historical farming to continue and permanently protect the land from development. The river's natural processes in the floodplain can continue with natural flooding of open space and agricultural fields. This avoids building levees that increase the risk of flooding downstream. The giant reed, or arundo, is a thirsty, invasive plant that lacks food value for native animals and impairs the growth of native plants.

The city of Santa Clarita protects significant portions of the natural ecology of the river within the Santa Clara River Open Space preserve, which includes portions of San Francisquito Creek and the South Fork of the Santa Clara River north of Lyons Avenue in Newhall.

Two wildlife corridor protection ordinances adopted by the county of Ventura restrict activities that impede the movement of mountains lions and other wildlife between the Santa Monica Mountains and the Los Padres National Forest. The river is included within the corridor especially at the junctions with major tributaries that connect to the Los Padres National Forest.

== See also ==
- Santa Clara River Trail
- List of rivers of California
