= Dry Canyon Sandstone Member =

- Stratigraphic range: Miocene
- Type: Formation
- Unit of: Calabasas Formation
- Thickness: 686 feet (209 m)

Location
- Region: Dry Canyon, Santa Monica Mountains, California
- Country: United States

The Dry Canyon Sandstone Member is a geologic formation in California. It is the oldest member of Calabasas Formation.
