= Sierra Pelona Ridge =

Mountain range of the Transverse Ranges in California, United States

Sierra Pelona
- Sierra Pelona Mountains
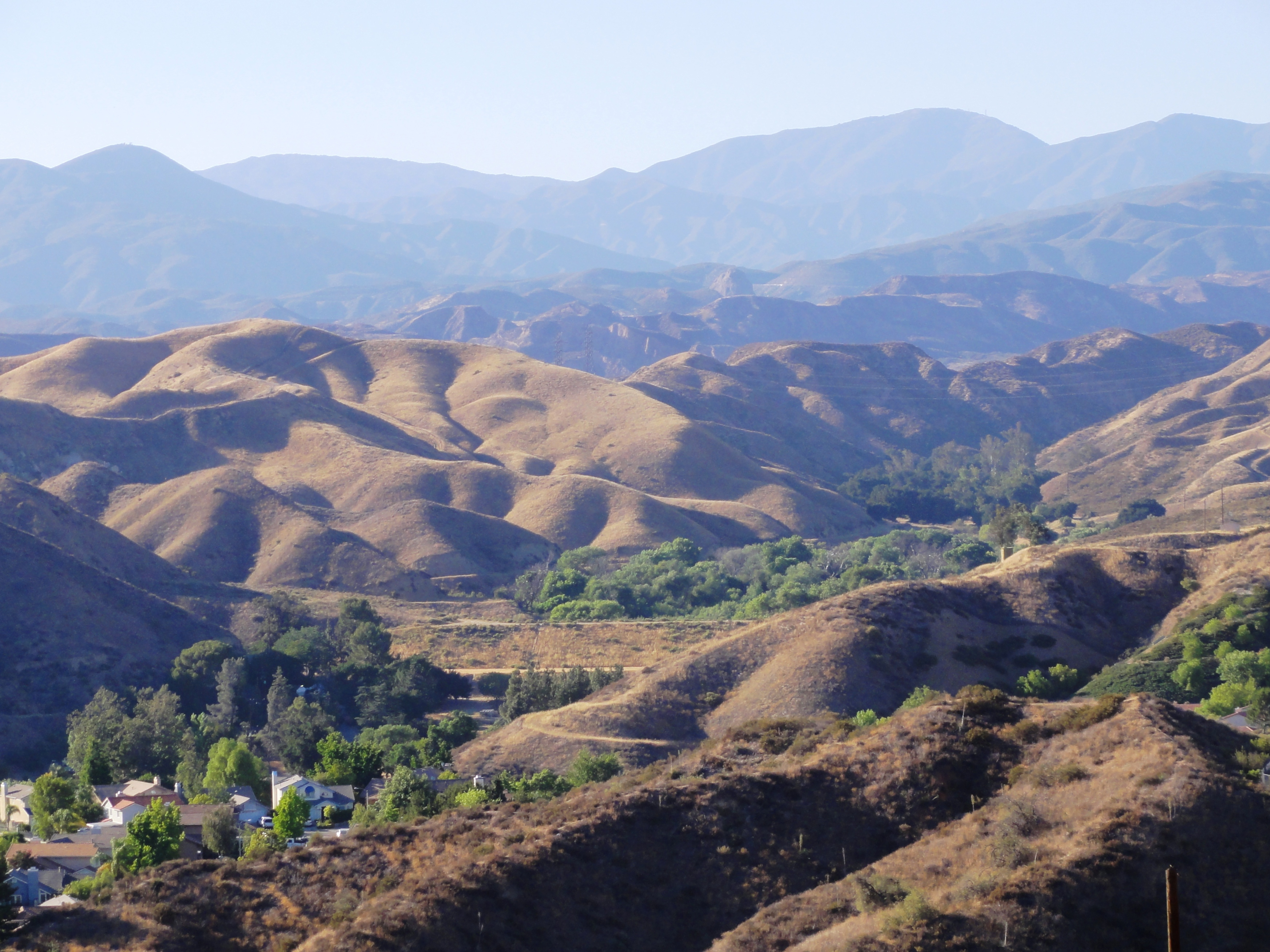
- View from Santa Clarita

Highest point
- Peak: Burnt Peak
- Elevation: 5,791 ft (1,765 m)
- Coordinates: 34.6825°N 118.5768°W

Naming
- Etymology: Spanish for "Bald Mountains"

Geography
- Location within California
- Location: Los Angeles County, California, U.S.
- Parent range: Transverse Ranges

The Sierra Pelona, also known as the Sierra Pelona Ridge or the Sierra Pelona Mountains and originally known as the Liebre Mountains, is a mountain ridge in the Transverse Ranges in Southern California. Located in northwest Los Angeles County, the ridge is bordered on the north by the San Andreas Fault and lies within and is surrounded by the Angeles National Forest and a tiny section in the Los Padres National Forest.

== Geography ==
The Sierra Pelona Mountains lie northwest of the San Gabriel Mountains, which are divided by the wide Soledad Canyon formation. The mountains are flanked to the south by the Santa Clarita Valley and separated from the Antelope Valley and the Mojave Desert to the north by the San Andreas Fault. Toward the southeast lie Vasquez Rocks, thrust up by the fault. Toward the west lies Interstate 5, Pyramid Lake, and the Los Padres National Forest. The range has a small extension west of I-5. The Tejon Pass separates the Sierra Pelonas, the San Emigdios, the Tehachapis, and the Topatopa Mountains near Gorman and Lebec.

Within the Sierra Pelonas lie the rural areas of Neenach, Three Points, Lake Hughes, Elizabeth Lake, Acton, Agua Dulce and Green Valley. The cities of Santa Clarita, Palmdale, and Lancaster are located at the base of the mountains.

== Climate ==
The climate of the mountains is a Mediterranean climate. Summers are mostly dry except for occasional thunderstorms, and winters comparatively cold and wet. Snowfall is infrequent due to the relatively low elevations of mountains within this ridge, with only the few tallest peaks regularly receiving snowfall during the winter.

== Ecology ==
Mainly the ridge falls under the California montane chaparral and woodlands ecoregion, excepting the northeastern flank's gradual slope into the Antelope Valley near Palmdale where the ecology transitions to that of the Mojave Desert. The mountains are primarily covered in short grasses, scrub oak trees, yucca, and other chaparral shrubs. The ridge is prone to wildfires in the summer and fall, especially when the Santa Ana winds blow in from the Antelope Valley.

== Hydrology ==
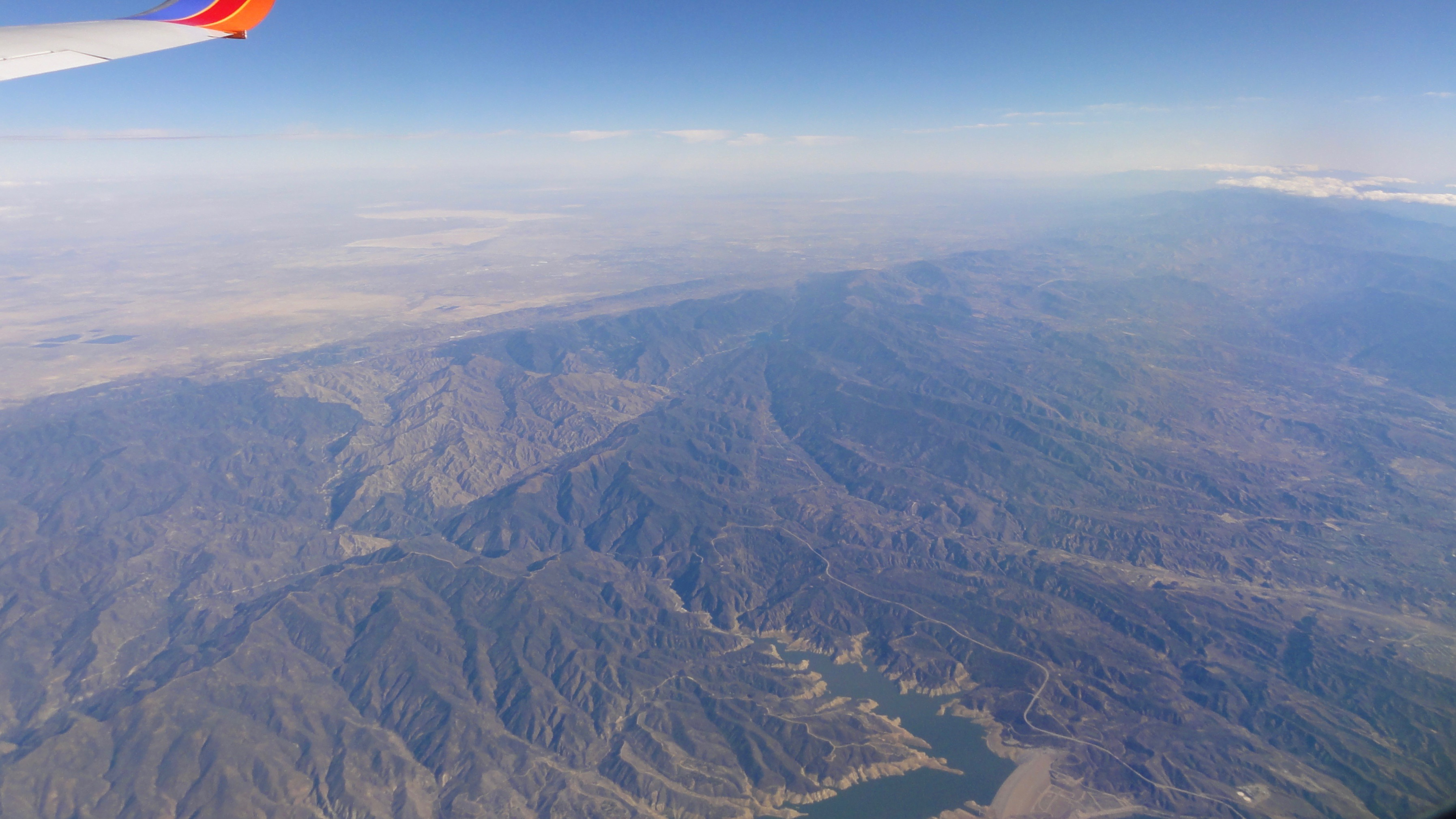
Aerial view of the Sierra Pelona Mountains and San Andreas Fault

Three major tributaries of the Santa Clara River and numerous minor watercourses and washes drain the ridge: Castaic Creek, San Francisquito Creek, and Bouquet Creek.

Three sag ponds nestle within the narrow valley that divides the mountains from the Antelope Valley: Hughes Lake, Munz Lakes, and Elizabeth Lake.

== Human history ==
=== Native American habitation ===
The Native population of California in the Sierra Pelona and Santa Susana Mountains included the Tataviam and Serrano people. They traded with the Tongva and Chumash to the south and west, until the Spanish colonization of the Americas relocated them from their homelands.

=== 18th and 19th centuries ===
The San Francisquito Canyon, which runs north-south through the mountains, served as a major wagon route between the Antelope and San Fernando Valleys. This corridor summited at San Francisquito Pass and was part of the El Camino Viejo - an alternate land route to the El Camino Real for reaching northern Spanish and Mexican colonial Alta California - as well as the Butterfield Overland Mail route.

=== 20th century ===
The Ridge Route, a landmark two-lane highway that connected Los Angeles to the rest of California, was built along the western flank of the ridge and was completed in 1915. It was later bypassed by the Ridge Route Alternate (US 99) in 1930, itself superseded by Interstate 5 completed in 1971.

The rapid development of Southern California throughout the 20th century saw construction of the Los Angeles Aqueduct and five separate reservoirs to supply water to the region: Castaic Lake, Bouquet Reservoir, Drinkwater Reservoir, Pyramid Lake and Dry Canyon Reservoir and the St. Francis Reservoir, both now drained and destroyed.

== Highest peaks ==
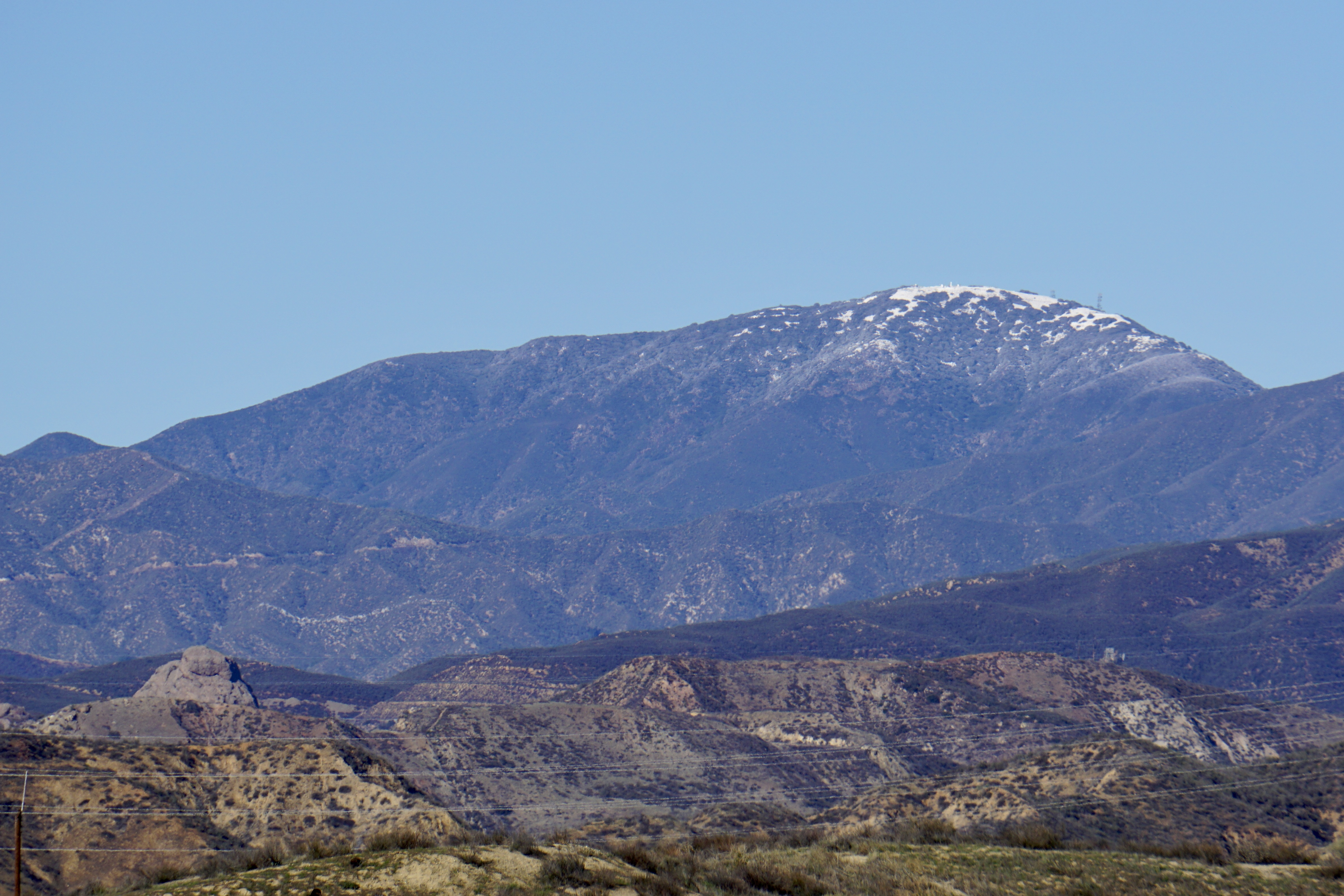
Burnt Peak is the tallest mountain in the Sierra Pelona Mountains.

- Burnt Peak: 5,788 ft (1,764 m)
- Liebre Mountain: 5,760+ ft (1,756+ m)
- Sawmill Mountain: 5,514 ft (1,681 m)
- Little Burnt Peak: 5,499 ft (1,676 m)
- Sierra Pelona: 5,220 ft (1,591 m)
- Sawtooth Mountain: 5,200 ft (1,585 m)
- Mount McDill: 5,177 ft(1,578 m)
- Grass Mountain: 4,606 ft (1,404 m)
- Redrock Mountain: 4,501 ft (1372 m)
- Jupiter Mountain: 4,498 ft (1,371 m)
- Whitaker Peak: 4,151 ft (1,265 m)
- Warm Springs Mountain: 4,019 ft (1,225 m)
- Redrock Mountain (benchmark): 3,991 ft (1,216 m)
- Reservoir Summit: 3,980 ft (1213 m)
- Townsend Peak: 3,184 ft (970 m)

== Adjacent landforms ==
- Tehachapi Mountains - on the north
- San Emigdio Mountains - on the northwest
- Topatopa Mountains - on the west
- Santa Susana Mountains - to the southwest
- San Gabriel Mountains - to the east
- Santa Clarita Valley - to the south
- Soledad Canyon - to the southeast
- Antelope Valley (part of the Mojave Desert) - on the east-northeast

== See also ==
- Centennial, California, a proposed master-planned community in the area
