= Green Valley, Los Angeles County, California =

Green Valley, California
- Unincorporated community Census designated place
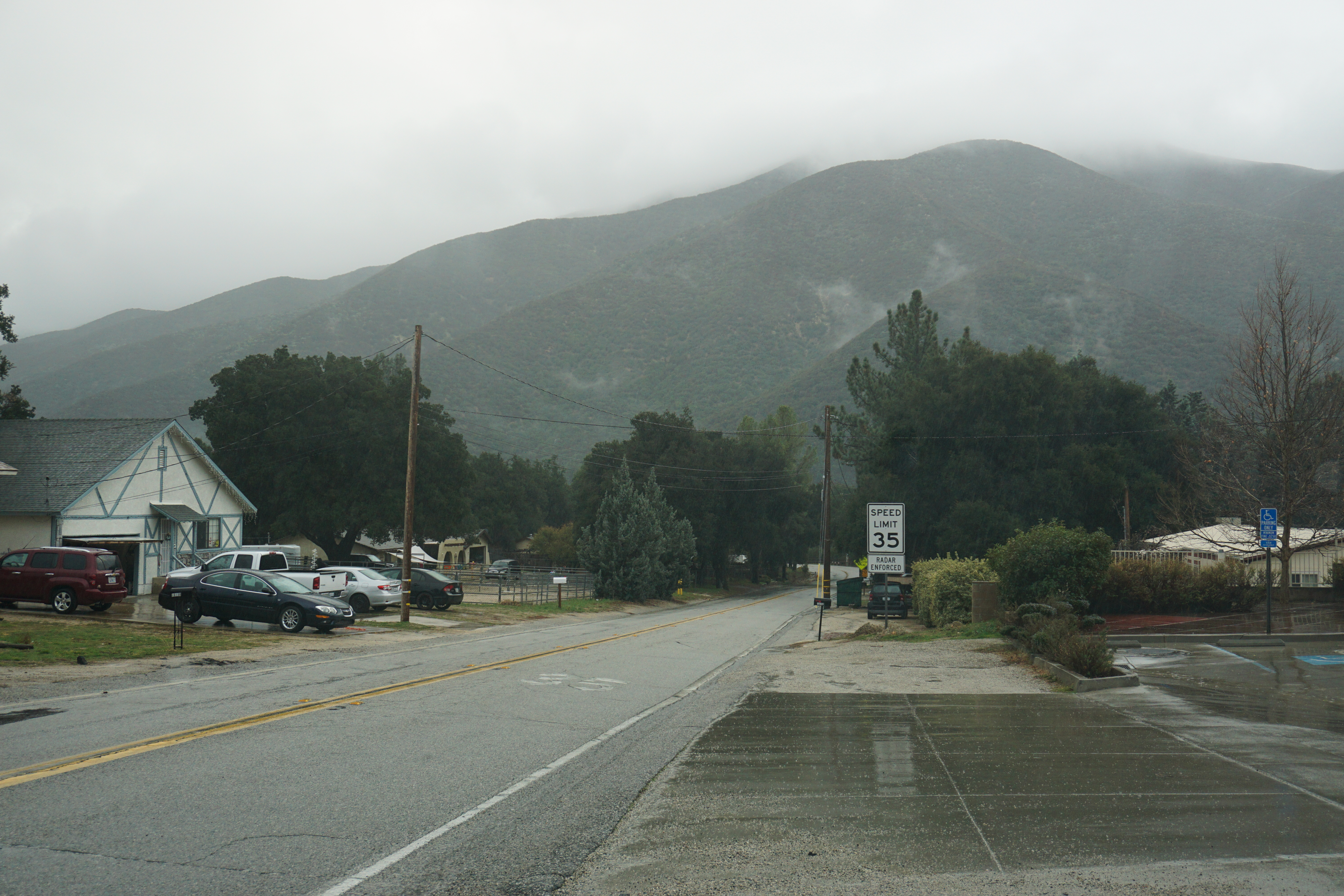

- Location in Los Angeles County, California

- Location of Green Valley in Greater Los Angeles Location of Green Valley in California
- Coordinates: 34°37′18″N 118°24′50″W
- Country: United States
- State: California
- County: Los Angeles

Area
  - Total: 12.809 sq mi (33.176 km^{2})
  - Land: 12.809 sq mi (33.175 km^{2})
  - Water: 0 sq mi (0 km^{2}) 0%
- Elevation: 2,936 ft (895 m)

Population (2020)
  - Total: 1,036
  - Density: 80.88/sq mi (31.23/km^{2})
- Time zone: UTC-8 (Pacific (PST))
  - Summer (DST): UTC-7 (PDT)
- ZIP Code: 91390
- Area code: 661
- GNIS feature IDs: 271423; 2583029

Green Valley is an unincorporated community and census-designated place (CDP) in the Sierra Pelona Mountains, in Los Angeles County, California, United States. It lies at an elevation of 2936 feet (895 m). The population was 1,036 at the 2020 census, up from 1,027 at the 2010 census.

== History ==
Widow Smith's Station of the Butterfield Overland Mail was located about a mile south of Green Valley, on the San Francisquito Canyon Road, remained into the 1960s at 38839 San Francisquito Canyon Road. The building still stands, the building is believed to have been in use at the time the Butterfield stage line used this route from 1858 to 1861. The station was in existence by 1856, when Harris Newmark says he stayed there overnight when returning to Los Angeles from a meeting at Fort Tejon. This would have been Widow Smith's Station or Gordon's Station, 24 miles southeast from French John's Station (that was located just west of Neenach) and 10 miles north of King's Station located in the lower San Francisquito Canyon.

== Geography ==
According to the United States Census Bureau, the CDP has a total area of 12.8 square miles (33.2 km^{2}), all land.

The town is located in the Sierra Pelona within San Francisquito Canyon and lies just a few miles northwest of the Bouquet Reservoir. It is 19 miles (31 km) west of Palmdale and 20 miles (33 km) north of Santa Clarita.

== Demographics ==
Historical population
Census	Pop.	Note	%±
2010	1,027		—
2020	1,036		0.9%
U.S. Decennial Census; 2000 2010; 2020

Green Valley first appeared as a census designated place in the 2010 U.S. census.

=== 2020 census ===
Green Valley CDP, Los Angeles County, California – Racial and ethnic composition Note: the US Census treats Hispanic/Latino as an ethnic category. This table excludes Latinos from the racial categories and assigns them to a separate category. Hispanics/Latinos may be of any race.
Race / Ethnicity (NH = Non-Hispanic)	Pop 2010	Pop 2020	% 2010	% 2020
White alone (NH)	833	763	81.11%	73.65%
Black or African American alone (NH)	8	8	0.78%	0.77%
Native American or Alaska Native alone (NH)	9	5	0.88%	0.48%
Asian alone (NH)	12	13	1.17%	1.25%
Native Hawaiian or Pacific Islander alone (NH)	1	2	0.10%	0.19%
Other race alone (NH)	5	1	0.49%	0.10%
Mixed race or Multiracial (NH)	36	61	3.51%	5.89%
Hispanic or Latino (any race)	123	183	11.98%	17.66%
Total	1,027	1,036	100.00%	100.00%

The 2020 United States census reported that Green Valley had a population of 1,036. The population density was 80.9 inhabitants per square mile (31.2/km^{2}). The racial makeup was 823 (79.4%) White, 8 (0.8%) African American, 18 (1.7%) Native American, 16 (1.5%) Asian, 2 (0.2%) Pacific Islander, 54 (5.2%) from other races, and 115 (11.1%) from two or more races. Hispanic or Latino of any race were 183 persons (17.7%).

The whole population lived in households. There were 442 households, out of which 110 (24.9%) had children under the age of 18 living in them, 190 (43.0%) were married-couple households, 45 (10.2%) were cohabiting couple households, 93 (21.0%) had a female householder with no partner present, and 114 (25.8%) had a male householder with no partner present. 120 households (27.1%) were one person, and 46 (10.4%) were one person aged 65 or older. The average household size was 2.34. There were 278 families (62.9% of all households).

The age distribution was 174 people (16.8%) under the age of 18, 59 people (5.7%) aged 18 to 24, 251 people (24.2%) aged 25 to 44, 375 people (36.2%) aged 45 to 64, and 177 people (17.1%) who were 65 years of age or older. The median age was 49.0 years. For every 100 females, there were 113.2 males.

There were 489 housing units at an average density of 38.2 units per square mile (14.7 units/km^{2}), of which 442 (90.4%) were occupied. Of these, 365 (82.6%) were owner-occupied, and 77 (17.4%) were occupied by renters.

=== 2010 census ===
At the 2010 census Green Valley had a population of 1,027. The population density was 80.2 inhabitants per square mile (31.0/km^{2}). The racial makeup of Green Valley was 901 (87.7%) White, 81 (7.8% Non-Hispanic White), 8 (0.8%) African American, 11 (1.1%) Native American, 12 (1.2%) Asian, 1 (0.1%) Pacific Islander, 35 (3.4%) from other races, and 59 (5.7%) from two or more races. Hispanic or Latino of any race were 123 people (12.0%).

The whole population lived in households, no one lived in non-institutionalized group quarters and no one was institutionalized.

There were 443 households, 116 (26.2%) had children under the age of 18 living in them, 214 (48.3%) were married couples living together, 31 (7.0%) had a female householder with no husband present, 39 (8.8%) had a male householder with no wife present. There were 32 (7.2%) unmarried partnerships, and 3 (0.7%) same-sex married couples or partnerships. 129 households (29.1%) were one person and 29 (6.5%) had someone living alone who was 65 or older. The average household size was 2.32. There were 284 families (64.1% of households); the average family size was 2.81.

The age distribution was 195 people (19.0%) under the age of 18, 71 people (6.9%) aged 18 to 24, 199 people (19.4%) aged 25 to 44, 429 people (41.8%) aged 45 to 64, and 133 people (13.0%) who were 65 or older. The median age was 47.0 years. For every 100 females, there were 113.5 males. For every 100 females age 18 and over, there were 111.7 males.

There were 515 housing units at an average density of 40.2 per square mile, of the occupied units 359 (81.0%) were owner-occupied and 84 (19.0%) were rented. The homeowner vacancy rate was 4.5%; the rental vacancy rate was 2.3%. 862 people (83.9% of the population) lived in owner-occupied housing units and 165 people (16.1%) lived in rental housing units.

According to the United States Census Bureau, Green Valley has a median household income of $83,359, with 7.6% of the population living below the federal poverty line.

== Education ==
Most of Green Valley is served by the Hughes-Elizabeth Lakes Union Elementary School District and by the Antelope Valley Union Joint High School District. A portion (within forest land) is served by the Saugus Union Elementary School District and the William S. Hart Union High School District. A southeastern part is in the Westside Union Elementary School District and by the Antelope Valley district.

== In popular culture ==
Much of the first three seasons of Justified, set in Harlan County, Kentucky, was filmed in Green Valley.
