= San Francisquito Canyon =

Canyon along San Francisquito Creek in the Sierra Pelona of California, United States

- Canyon
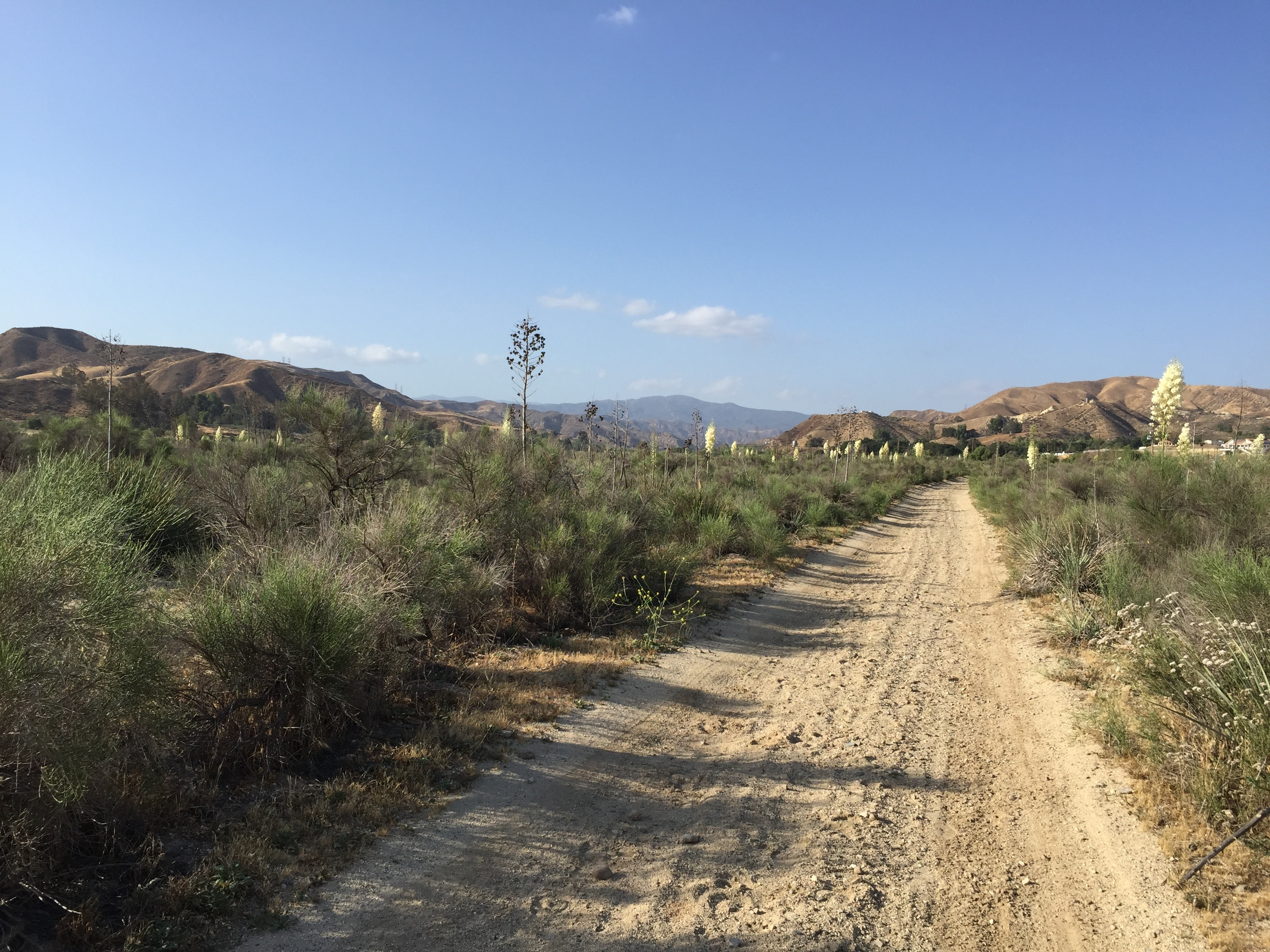
- San Francisquito Canyon is home to low-lying shrubs, dry grasses, and towering yucca that bloom during the spring.

- Location within the Los Angeles metropolitan area Location within California
- Coordinates: 34°32′18″N 118°31′30″W
- Location: Los Angeles County, California, United States
- Range: Sierra Pelona Mountains
- Formed by: San Francisquito Creek

Dimensions
  - Length: 19.5 mi (31.4 km)
- Highest elevation: 3,655 feet (1,114 m) (San Francisquito Pass)

San Francisquito Canyon is a canyon created through erosion of the Sierra Pelona Mountains by the San Francisquito Creek, in Los Angeles County, Southern California.

== Geography ==
The canyon cuts through the Sierra Pelona Mountains, which are central part of the Transverse Ranges system of California. At the San Francisquito Canyon head is the San Francisquito Pass, which the early routes between Los Angeles and the San Joaquin Valley crossed. The canyon grows wider as it approaches the Santa Clarita Valley.

The middle and upper portions of this canyon fall within the Angeles National Forest.

== History ==
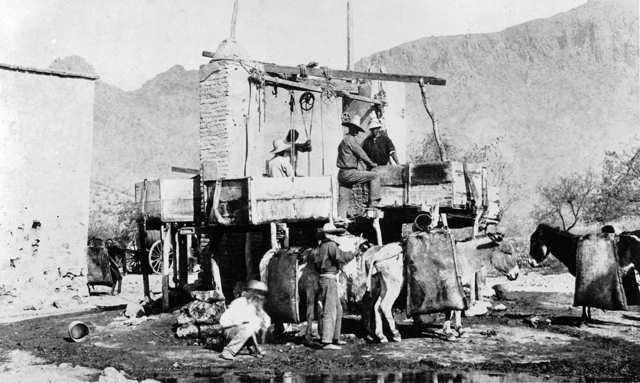
Miners operating a hydraulic sluice at San Francisquito Canyon (c. 1890–1900).

=== Mining ===
San Francisquito Canyon was the site of placer mining for gold by Spanish missionaries from the San Fernando and San Buenaventura Missions, and later by Mexican Californios. Their activity stopped in 1848, when the gold discovery at Sutter's Mill started the California Gold Rush. Placer mining later occurred in the canyon into at least the late 19th century.

=== St. Francis Dam ===
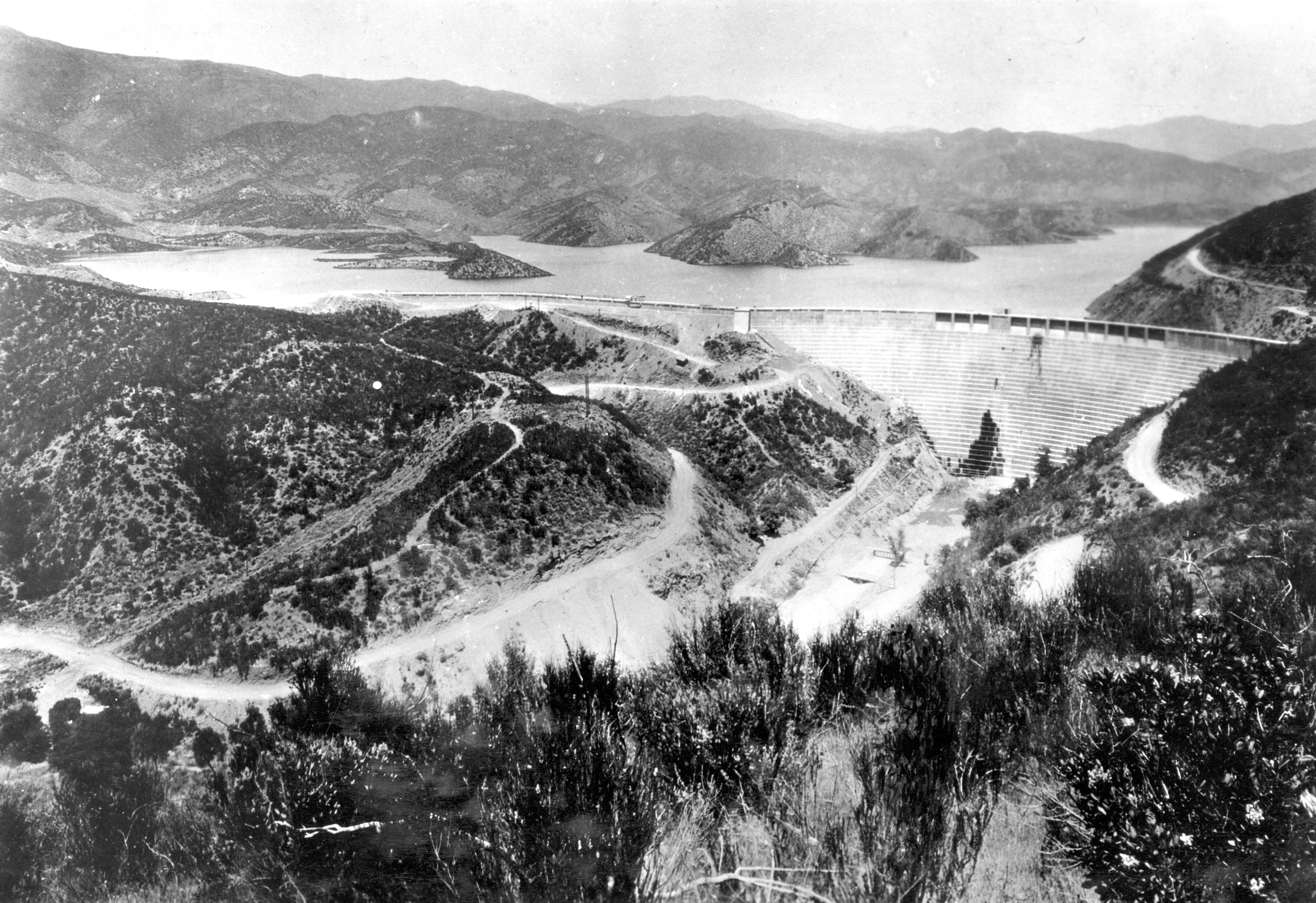
Water held in a reservoir behind the St. Francis Dam in early 1927.

Between 1924 and 1926, the canyon was the site of the construction of the St. Francis Dam. The Los Angeles Department of Water and Power began filling a reservoir in the San Francisquito Canyon in 1926. At 11:57 pm on March 12, 1928, the dam catastrophically failed, and the resulting flood took the lives of at least 431 people. The collapse of the St. Francis Dam is considered to be one of the worst American civil engineering disasters of the 20th century and remains the second-greatest loss of life in California's history, after the 1906 San Francisco earthquake and fire. The ruins of this disaster can still be seen today.

=== Roads ===
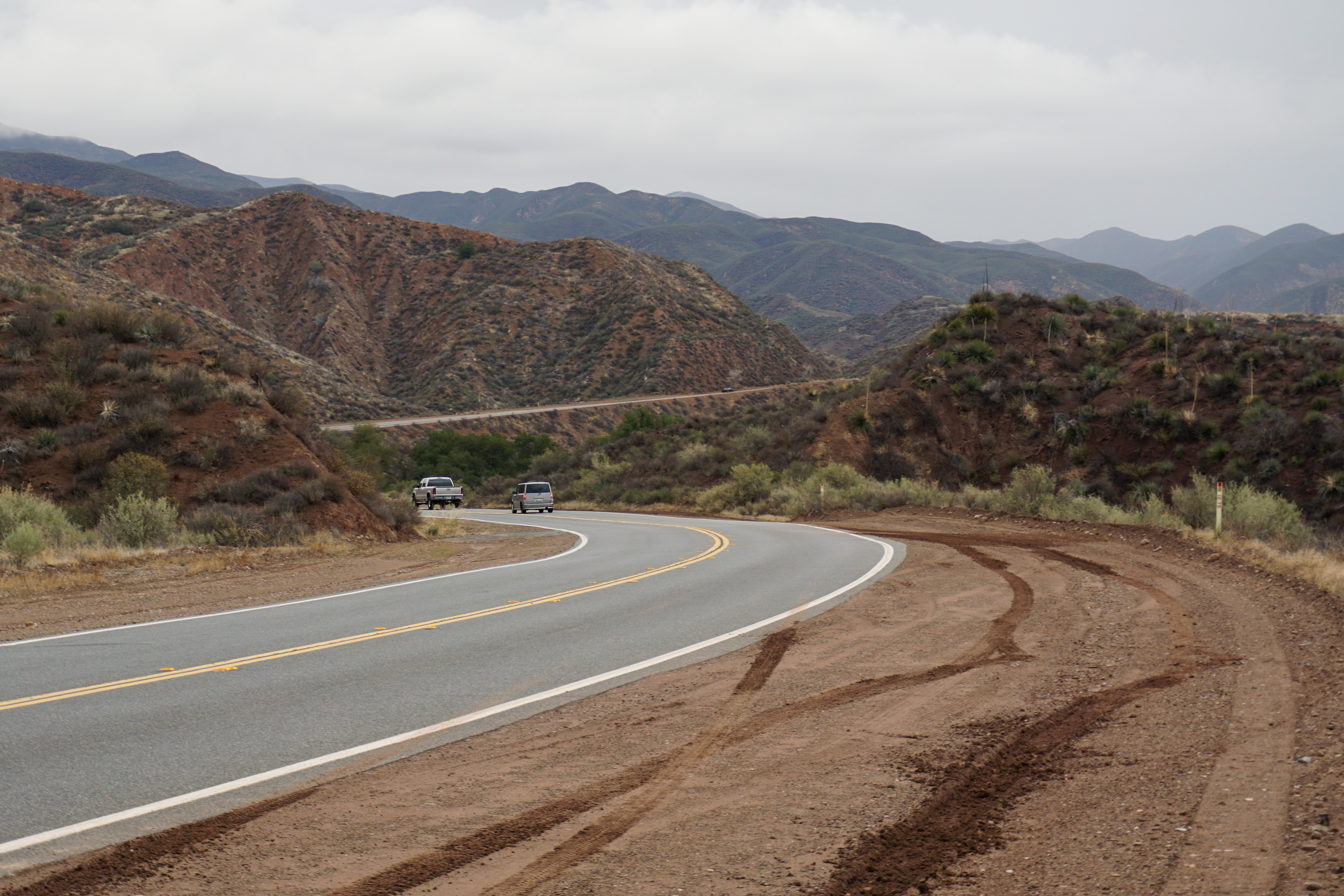
Looking upstream toward Green Valley from the St. Francis Dam ruins.

Since 1820, San Francisquito Canyon and San Francisquito Pass were part of the original route of the El Camino Viejo, an alternate land route to the El Camino Real for reaching northern Spanish and Mexican colonial Alta California. From 1854, the wagon route of the Stockton - Los Angeles Road followed its course as did the Butterfield Overland Mail in California from 1858 to 1861. This Tejon Pass Route and the Tehachapi or Midway Route (first followed by the Southern Pacific Railroad), remained the major north–south wagon and later automobile routes to the San Joaquin Valley until the construction of the more direct Ridge Route in 1915.

Today, a two-lane road named after the canyon itself connects Santa Clarita to the mountain communities of Green Valley and Elizabeth Lake. It roughly parallels the river's course between San Francisquito Pass and its southern terminus in the northern Santa Clarita Valley.

== See also ==
- San Francisquito Formation
- Castaic Creek - a neighboring stream
- Dry Canyon Reservoir - a nearby reservoir completed in 1912
