= Harvey Banks =

Harvey Banks may refer to:

- Harvey Oren Banks (1910–1996), American civil engineer
- Harvey Washington Banks (1923–1979), American professor of physics and astronomy
