= California Department of Water Resources =

California government department

- Seal of the California Department of Water Resources

Agency overview
- Formed: 1956
- Preceding agencies: Water Project Authority; Department of Public Works
- Headquarters: 715 P St, Sacramento, California
- Agency executive: Karla Nemeth, Director
- Parent agency: California Natural Resources Agency
- Website: www.water.ca.gov

The California Department of Water Resources (DWR) is part of the California Natural Resources Agency and is responsible for the management and regulation of the State of California's water usage. The department was created in 1956 by Governor Goodwin Knight following severe flooding across Northern California in 1955, where they combined the Division of Water Resources of the Department of Public Works with the State Engineer's Office, the Water Project Authority, and the State Water Resources Board. It is headquartered in Sacramento.

== History ==
=== 1850-1875 ===
California recognizes many types of water rights. Prior to the Treaty of Guadalupe Hidalgo, signed in 1848, California was part of Mexico. Riparian rights were the most prevalent type of water right. Under riparian rights, which have their origins in Roman law, a landowner can use water flowing by his property for use on his property. When California became part of the United States, the United States agreed to recognize existing law. Pueblo rights were the only vested water rights at the time. Pueblo rights provided that Spanish and Mexican pueblos were entitled to the paramount beneficial use of all needed naturally occurring water from the entire watershed of a stream flowing through the pueblo.

When gold was discovered in 1848, immigrants from all over the world came to California. During the California Gold Rush, gold miners would divert large quantities of water from rivers and streams for hydraulic mining. Local custom dictated how water was shared in mining camps, but in general, the miners followed the same practice in allocating water as they did in staking their mineral claims. In its earliest form, an appropriative water right was created simply by taking water and putting it to beneficial use. However, to "state a claim" miners would often post a notice to others that they were taking and using water. Soon after California became a U.S. state in 1850, the first session of the California State Legislature immediately adopted laws to deal with the state's water. This included the adoption of the English common law system, which also included the doctrine of riparian rights, although this system was better suited to the water-rich eastern United States. Shortly thereafter, Californian courts recognized appropriative water rights.

Because of these plural systems of water allocation, disputes soon ensued; these differences were resolved by the state courts. In 1872, the Legislature adopted a procedure in the Civil Code to provide a method for those claiming an appropriative water right to record their claims with the county recorder of each county. In 1886, the courts addressed competing claims between riparians and appropriators in the case of "Lux v. Haggin." However, within 25 years, excessive claims to water rights threatened to affect economic development in the state. In response, the governor formed a Water Commission to make recommendations regarding California's water law. In 1913, Californian voters adopted by referendum the Water Commission Act, which created the state Water Commission and set forth an administrative procedure for acquiring an appropriative right.

In 1926, the courts held that a riparian water user was entitled to the full flow of a stream, without regard to the reasonableness of the use. In response, in 1928, the California Constitution was amended to require that all water use in California be reasonable and beneficial. (Article X, Section 2).

=== 1875–1900 ===
In 1878, William Hammond Hall of the Office of State Engineer conducted a series of investigations in California's Central Valley and drafted a series of plans calling for various publicly funded and owned irrigation projects. Hall's study was accomplished on a budget of $100,000. The Central Valley continued to grow in the absence of a state-run project, yet Central Valley landowners and coastal cities (including San Francisco) managed to acquire water rights in the Sierra Nevada mountain range for use in the valley.

=== 1900–1925 ===
In response to growing political and legal contests for limited water resources, the Water Commission Act of 1913 established the Water Commission to oversee permits associated with the rights to use surface water. The Water Commission Act became effective on December 19, 1914. Landowners or water users that had established water usage prior to 1914 became senior water rights users in many of the more accessible watersheds in the state. Appropriative water rights were processed by the Division of Water Rights, originally under the State Engineer, and subsequently under the Department of Water Resources, the State Water Rights Board, and finally, the State Water Resources Control Board.

In 1919, Col. Robert B. Marshall, Chief Surveyor for the U.S. Geological Survey, proposed a plan for the federal government to build a series of diversion dams, and two grand canals along the sides of the Sacramento and San Joaquin Valleys, consequently irrigating California's Central Valley. Though national interest in Marshall's plan was limited, there was an interest in California for pursuing the proposed project.

=== 1925–1950 ===
In 1927, the California State Legislature passed a law authorizing the Department of Finance to file applications with the Division of Water Rights to reserve any unappropriated surface water for future development. A number of claims were filed on July 30, 1927. The department subsequently acquired water rights permits that resulted from some of these filings. In 1933, the California State Legislature and Governor James Rolph approved the construction of the Central Valley Project, with initial plans to build a 420-foot dam at Kennett. This would provide regular flows out to the San Francisco Estuary, reducing salinity intrusion into the Sacramento-San Joaquin Delta. Unable to finance the construction of Kennett Dam, the state applied to the federal government for aid. After the U.S. House of Representatives Committee on Rivers and Harbors reviewed the state plans, Congress enacted the Rivers and Harbors Act of 1935, giving the U.S. federal government control over the Central Valley Project (CVP).

=== 1950–1975 ===
In the mid-1950s, California was experiencing substantial growth. San Francisco's Caspar W. Weinberger, Chairman of the California Assembly Government Organization Committee, held a series of statewide hearings in 1954 and 1955 focused on creating a State Water Project that could supply the growing municipal and agricultural demands of the state. On July 5, 1956, in a special session of the California Assembly, Governor Goodwin J. Knight signed Weinberger's bill to combine the then Division of Water Resources of the Department of Public Works with the State Engineer's Office, the Water Project Authority, and the State Water Resources Board into a new department: the Department of Water Resources. Consulting engineer Harvey O. Banks was appointed by Governor Knight as the department's first director and given the task of developing a plan for the proposed State Water Project.

In 1959, the Legislature enacted the Burns-Porter Act which authorized $1.75 billion for the construction of the proposed State Water Project. The Burns-Porter Act was approved by Californian voters in 1960 and in the same year the Whale Rock Dam, DWR's first major water project located near San Luis Obispo, was completed.

In 1961, William Warne was appointed director of the department and oversaw the construction of a key facility in the operation of the State Water Project: Oroville Dam. The DWR and the United States Bureau of Reclamation also signed an agreement to design a joint reservoir in San Luis. Because water from the Oroville and Shasta dams (from the existing Central Valley Project) would be moved down the existing Sacramento River channel into the Sacramento-San Joaquin River Delta, excess flows would roll through the delta and then be stored in the Central Valley until needed. Construction of the Harvey O. Banks Pumping Plant, located near Tracy, California, also began in 1963.

=== DWR timeline ===
Year	Event(s)
1850	California becomes the 31st state in the United States of America
1878	Office of State Engineer established with appointment of civil engineer William Hammond Hall
1887	California Legislature approves the Wright Act which enables citizens to create local irrigation districts
1919	US Geological Survey Lt. Colonel Robert Marshall publishes a plan to transfer water from the Sacramento River to the San Joaquin Valley and Southern California
1929	First California Snow Survey conducted; In response to the St. Francis Dam disaster, California Legislature creates a dam safety program
1933	Bond act approved for Central Valley Project (CVP), but due to dwindling state coffers from the Great Depression, funding was not enough for the state government to build the project, thus the CVP was turned over to the U.S. federal government
1951	Bulletin 1, an inventory of Californian water resources, is published by the State Water Resources Board; State Engineer A.D. Edmonston proposed the Feather River Project (which later becomes the State Water Project)
1955	Bulletin 2, which updates the information from Bulletin 1 and forecasts future water needs, is published by the State Water Resources Board
1956	Governor Goodwin Knight calls a special session of the Legislature to create a Department of Water Resources; Harvey O. Banks is appointed as the first director
1957	Work begins in the city of Oroville for construction of a dam on the Feather River; Bulletin 3, now named the California Water Plan Update, is published by the DWR
1959	Burns-Porter Act passes the Legislature, authoring construction of a State Water Project
1960	Voters approve bond to finance the State Water Project; Metropolitan Water District of Southern California signs up as first contractor for SWP water; US Congress authorizes construction of the San Luis Unit of the CVP
1961	Frenchman Dam is completed; Davis-Dolwig Act passes the Legislature, allowing for recreation, fish, and wildlife enhancement; William Warne appointed as second DWR director
1962	Work begins on Oroville Dam; Patterson Dam completed; State and federal governments agree to construct San Luis Joint-Use Complex
1963	California Supreme Court rules that the DWR can sell additional revenue bonds to finance SWP construction
1964	Antelope Dam is completed; Oroville Fish Barrier Dam is completed
1965	Santa Clara Terminal Reservoir is completed
1966	Dos Amigos Pumping Plant is completed
1967	Grizzly Dam (Lake Davis) is completed; Oroville Dam is completed; Hyatt Pumping/Generating Plant is completed; Feather River Fish Hatchery is completed and begins operation; O'Neill Dam, San Luis Dam, and Gianelli Pumping/Generating Plant are completed; William Gianelli is appointed as third Director
1968	Oroville Diversion Dam is completed; Thermalito Afterbay Dam is completed; North Bay Aqueduct & Napa Turnout Reservoir are completed; Del Valle Dam is completed; California Aqueduct from Banks Pumping Plant to San Luis Reservoir is completed; California Aqueduct - San Luis Canal completed; Los Perillas and Badger Hill Pumping Plants are completed; Governor Ronald Reagan dedicates Lake Oroville and Oroville Dam, initiating beginning of operations of the SWP; State Water Resources Control Board Decision 1379 is adopted, setting water quality standards for the SWP and CVP
1969	Thermalito Pumping / Generating Plant is completed; South Bay Pumping Plant is completed; Del Valle Pumping Plant is completed; Banks Pumping Plant is completed (4 additional pumps are added in 1986); Clifton Court Forebay is completed
1970	John E. Skinner Delta Fish Protection Facility is completed
1971	California Aqueduct constructed to Tehachapi Crossing; Cedar Springs Dam (Silverwood Lake) is completed
1972	Buena Vista and Terrink Pumping Plants are completed; Oso Pumping Plant is completed; Clean Water Act is enacted by both houses of the U.S. Congress
1973	Chrisman Pumping Plant is completed; Pyramid Dam and Castaic Power Plant are completed; Pearblossom Pumping Plant is completed; Santa Anna Pipeline is completed; John R. Teerink is appointed fourth director
1974	Castaic Dam is completed; Devil Canyon Power Plant completed; Perris Dam is completed
1975	Ronald Robie appointed fifth director
1982	California Aqueduct West Branch completed; Warne Power Plant completed; Irrigation management weather stations provided to farmers
1983	DWR is classified as a "bulk entity" and begins entering its own electricity contracts; David N. Kennedy is appointed sixth director
2007	Judge orders DWR to cease its export operations through the delta, citing that it does not have a valid permit to operate the California State Water Project pumps per the California Environmental Quality Act.

== Legal and political authorization ==
Though the DWR was formed in 1956 with the purpose to build and operate the State Water Project, as a state organization responsible for the development and protection of water resources, the department has since been subject to numerous legislative, judicial, and administrative orders that dictate how the department should protect the public trust. Like any other water user, the DWR must apply for water rights permits from the State Water Resources Control Board. The water rights decisions of the Control Board limit the amount of water that the department can provide to communities and also are responsible for many of the legal, administrative, and environmental projects that the department has adopted.

Unlike most other users, the department also must answer to the Governor's Office and State Legislature. Flood control and local assistance programs often have a basis in the DWR's role as a resource trustee, while water supply, environmental mitigation, and electricity generation are often related to the DWR's role as a water permittee.

== State Water Project ==
=== Scope ===
The project makes deliveries to two-thirds of California's population. It includes 34 storage facilities, reservoirs and lakes; 20 pumping plants; four pumping-generating plants; five hydroelectric power plants; and about 701 miles of open canals and pipelines.

=== State Water Project facts and figures ===
Number of storage Facilities	33
Lakes/Reservoirs (primary)	21
Total Reservoir Storage	5.8 million acre-feet = 7.2 cubic kilometers
Highest Dam Structure	770 feet (230 meters)
Largest Annual Energy Output	8.57 Billion kWh (2002)
Average Net Energy Use	5.1 Billion kWh

== List of DWR projects ==
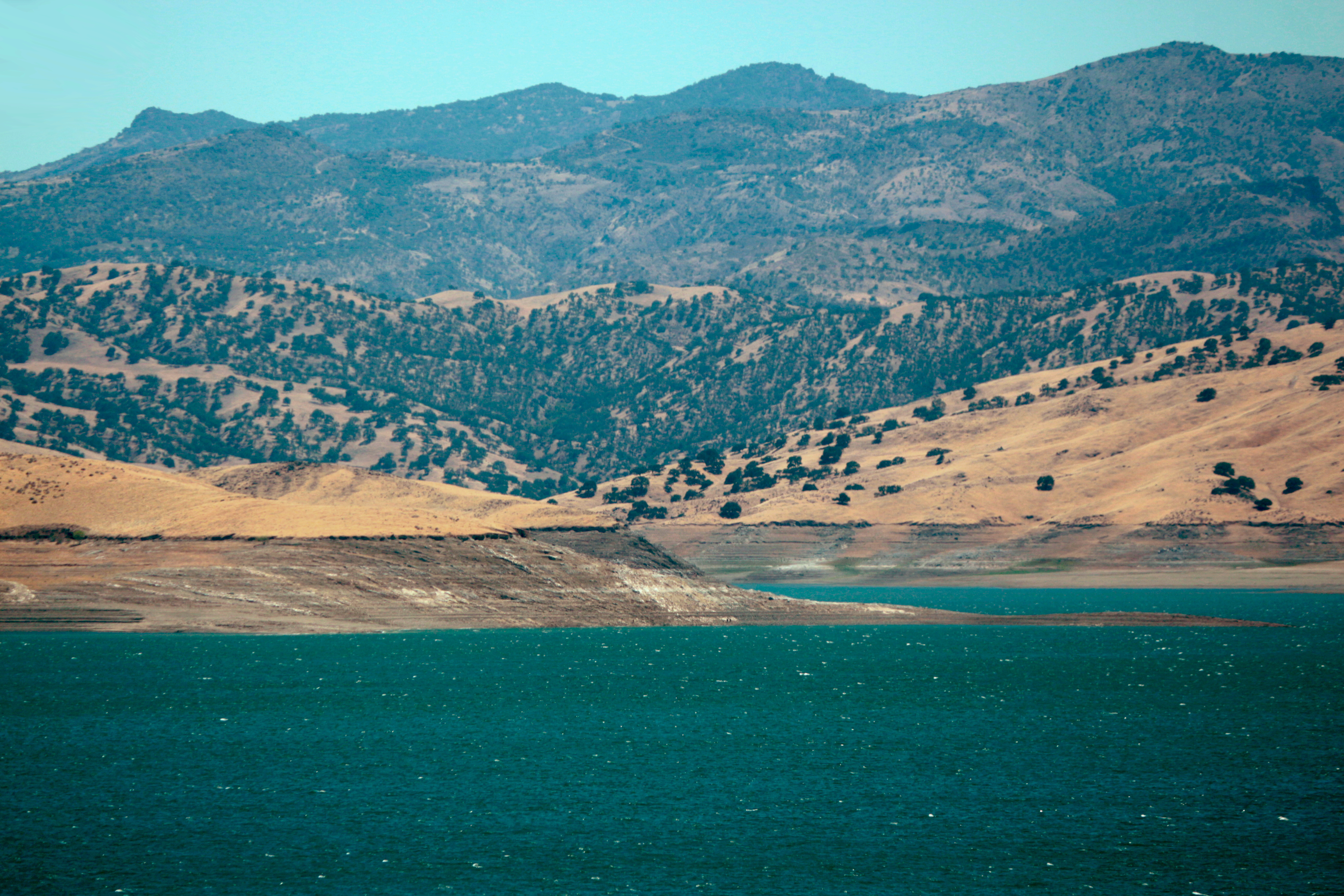
San Luis Reservoir in July 2021

=== Conveyance and storage facilities ===
- Oroville Dam (1967)
- North Bay Aqueduct
- Clifton Court Forebay
- Harvey O. Banks Pumping Plant (1968)
- South Bay Aqueduct
- California Aqueduct
  - West Branch
  - East Branch
  - Coastal Branch
- O'Neill Forebay
- San Luis Reservoir (1967)
- Whale Rock Dam (1960)
- Edmonston Pumping Plant (1971)
- Silverwood Lake
- Lake Perris

=== Flood control projects ===
- Sutter Bypass
- Tisdale Weir
- Tisdale Bypass
- Sacramento Weir
- Yolo Bypass

=== Recreation projects ===
- Antelope Dam (1964)

=== Mitigation/restoration projects ===
The following is a list of projects that the DWR oversees or contributes to that are designed to mitigate the impacts of the operation of the State Water Project.

- Feather River Salmon and Steelhead Hatchery (1967)
- Thermalito Afterbay (1968)
- Yolo Bypass Wildlife Recreation Area
- Suisun Marsh
- Skinner Fish Facility
- South Delta Improvements Program
- South Delta Temporary Barriers Program

== List of directors ==
This is a list of DWR directors.

Director	Term	Notes
Harvey Oren Banks	July 5, 1956–December 12, 1960	DWR's first director.
William E. Warne	January 1, 1961–December 30, 1966	
William R. Gianelli	January 1, 1967–April 31, 1973	
John R. Teerink	September 1, 1973–March 3, 1975	
Ronald B. Robie	March 6, 1975–December 31, 1982	
Howard Eastin	January 3, 1983–June 21, 1983	Interim Director
David N. Kennedy	June 22, 1983–December 31, 1998	
Thomas M. Hannigan	March 1, 1999–June 1, 2003	
Michael J. Spear	June 9, 2003–November 16, 2003	Interim Director
Linda S. Adams	November 17, 2003–February 23, 2004	DWR's first female director.
Lester A. Snow	February 24, 2004–January 31, 2010	
Mark W. Cowin	February 1, 2010–Dec 31, 2016	
Bill Croyle	January 1, 2017 - July 1, 2017	Interim Director
Grant Davis	July 19, 2017 - January 10, 2018	
Karla Nemeth	January 10, 2018 – Present	

== See also ==
- California Department of Water Resources dams
- California Environmental Protection Agency (CAL EPA)
- California State Water Resources Control Board (SWRCB)
- Southern California Coastal Water Research Project
- United States Bureau of Reclamation
- Water in California topics
