= Water Resources Collections and Archives =

Archive and library for water resources and supply in the western United States

- Location: Riverside, San Bernardino, California
- Established: 1958

Access and use
- Population served: University of California, State of California, and the public

Other information
- Website: http://library.ucr.edu/wrca/

The Water Resources Collections and Archives (WRCA), formerly known as the Water Resources Center Archives, is an archive with unpublished manuscript collections and a library with published materials. It was established to collect unique, hard-to-find, technical report materials pertaining to all aspects of water resources and supply in California and the American West. Located on the campus of the University of California Riverside (UCR), it is jointly administered by the UCR College of Natural and Agricultural Sciences (CNAS) and the UCR Libraries. WRCA was part of the University of California Center for Water Resources (WRC) that was established and funded in 1957 by a special act of the California State Legislature and was designated the California Water Research Institute by a federal act in 1964.

== History ==
WRCA was formed in 1958 as the research component of WRC. At that time, the WRC was a system-wide unit administered by the University of California Office of the President, Division of Agriculture and Natural Resources (ANR).

Although WRCA staff began collecting materials in 1958, the library portion of the collection includes select materials dating from the late 19th century, with exceptional strength in its coverage of California water history from the early 1900s to the present. This extensive coverage is due to the generous donations of archival and print materials from UC professors, hydrologists, the staff of various government agencies and private donors.

On October 2, 2009, ANR announced that WRCA would have a "new academic home" by June 30, 2010, and that WRC would close on December 31, 2009. There was a public and political outcry in support of WRCA staff, services, and collections to remain funded at the UC Berkeley campus, but on July 16, 2010, ANR announced that WRCA would relocate to UC Riverside, and entering into a collaborative partnership with the Water Resources Institute at CSU San Bernardino.

== Collections ==
WRCA is the premier library of its kind in the United States, specifically collecting contemporary and historic material, technical reports, and gray literature on water resources development in California and the West. The collection includes national and international material as well. WRCA's archival materials are discoverable in the Online Archive of California. WRCA's collection is cataloged in OCLC and is searchable in UC Riverside's Scotty catalog and in the University of California's Melvyl catalog.

The collection consists of more than 200,000 cataloged reports and approximately 2,200 serial items. WRCA currently receives more than 2,600 specialized newsletters and annual reports published by water or irrigation districts, non-profit organizations, water associations and federal agencies. The collection includes more than 6,200 archival maps and more than 600 films. WRCA also actively maintains more than 200 unique manuscript collections, included in these materials are more than 25,000 unique photographs (chiefly black & white) and approximately 45,000 coastal aerial photographs.

WRCA's manuscript collections include materials from engineers and agencies influential in California's water infrastructure (engineering, groundwater, environmental, etc.). Some highlights include the papers of engineers and attorneys such as Joseph B. Lippincott, Hans Albert Einstein, Frank Adams, Charles Derleth, John S. Eastwood, John D. Galloway, Sidney T. Harding, Walter L. Huber, Edward Hyatt, Joe W. Johnson, Robert Kelley, Bernard Etcheverry, Harvey Oren Banks, Milton N. Nathanson, Luna Leopold and Murrough P. O'Brien, amongst others. WRCA also holds institutional and legal records from numerous organizations, including Mono Lake Committee, California Department of Water Resources, East Bay Municipal Utilities District, and the Berkeley Creeks Task Force.

The collection overall is particularly strong in river and creek restoration (chiefly specific to the San Francisco Bay Area), Sacramento-San Joaquin Delta, San Francisco Bay, California Aqueduct, Los Angeles Aqueduct, Owens Valley, California legislation and policy, and dam construction and removal.

== Initiatives ==
The WRCA's initiatives include:

- Clearinghouse for Dam Removal Information (CDRI): an online repository for documents about proposed and completed dam removal projects. CDRI's goal is to collect documents from government agencies, consulting firms, universities, and nonprofits to help people making a decision about whether to remove a dam. CDRI includes links to conferences and databases that are pertinent to dam removal and current videos that capture dam removals in progress.
- eScholarship: WRCA administers an open-access eScholarship repository that includes full-text PDFs of WRC's Technical Completion Reports series, UCB Hydraulic Engineering Laboratory Reports, faculty working papers, and graduate student papers from two Landscape Architecture and Environmental Planning courses.
- Online Archive of California (OAC): WRCA has 117 XML collection guides hosted at OAC. Within these collections, 1,200 images are available digitally; digitization and metadata creation funded by multiple grant projects, including the Joseph B. Lippincott Los Angeles Aqueduct images (funded by a California Library Services and Technology grant) and the Origins of Western Water, a multi-university grant funded by the National Endowment for the Humanities and hosted by the Western Waters Digital Library.
- Web Archiving Service: WRCA administers the California Water Districts Web Archive, harvesting, preserving, and making available transient content from hundreds of California water and irrigation district websites. Since 2010, WRCA has also administered the Sacramento-San Joaquin River Delta WAS Collection.
- OCLC Digital Archive (via ContentDM): WRCA catalogs and preserves born-digital items and makes them available via OCLC's Digital Archive on the ContentDM platform. These are discoverable from the OskiCat, Melvyl, and OCLC catalogs.
- California Colloquium on Water: WRCA managed and hosted this lecture series for ten years, where scholars of natural sciences, engineering, social sciences, humanities, law, and environmental design will offer monthly lectures. Streaming video and PowerPoint presentations of these lectures since 2000 are available online.
- Cache Creek Catalog: an ongoing project to provide access to all types of documents pertaining to Cache Creek and vicinity in Yolo and Lake Counties, California.
- Digitization of the California Water Atlas: In 2009, WRCA coordinated with David Rumsey and the State of California Governor's Office to digitize and make publicly available this 1979 publication.

== Publications using WRCA collections ==
WRCA's services and materials have been influential and utilized in numerous publications and films. The following is a small representation of these materials:

- Hazardous Metropolis : Flooding and Urban Ecology in Los Angeles / by Jared Orsi. Berkeley, University of California Press, 2004. ISBN 978-0-520-23850-3
- Tales of the San Joaquin: A River Journey (Film) / Written and directed by Christopher Beaver. Sausalito, CA : Christopher Beaver Films, 2003.
- Water and the California Dream: Choices for the New Millennium / David Carle. Berkeley: University of California Press & Sierra Club Books, 2003. ISBN 1-57805-095-2 (papbk.)
- William Mulholland and the Rise of Los Angeles / by Catherine Mulholland. Berkeley: University of California Press, 2000. ISBN 0-520-21724-1.
- Water & the Shaping of California : A Literary, Political and Technological Perspective on the Power of Water, and How the Effort to Control It Has Transformed the State / by Sue McClurg; foreword by Kevin Star; [editor, Rita Schmidt Sudman]. Sacramento: Water Education Foundation in conjunction with Heyday Books, 2000. ISBN 978-1-890771-37-9 (cloth); 1-890771-33-3 (pbk.)
- Imperial San Francisco: Urban Power, Earthly Ruin / by Gray Brechin. Berkeley: University of California Press, c1999. ISBN 0-520-21568-0.
- The Los Angeles River: Its Life, Death, and Possible Rebirth / by Blake Gumprecht. Baltimore and London: Johns Hopkins University Press, 1999. (Creating the North American Landscape). ISBN 0-8018-6047-4.
- Building the Ultimate Dam: John S. Eastwood and the Control of Water in the West / by Donald C. Jackson. Lawrence, Kansas: University Press of Kansas, 1995. (Development of Western Resources). ISBN 0-7006-0716-1.
- Rivers in the Desert: William Mulholland and the Inventing of Los Angeles / by Margaret Leslie Davis. New York: HarperCollins, 1993. ISBN 0-06-016698-3 (cloth); 0-06-092194-3 (pbk.).
- The Great Thirst: Californians and Water, 1770s–1990s / by Norris Hundley, Jr. Berkeley: University of California Press, c1992. ISBN 0-520-07786-5.
- The Water Encyclopedia. 2nd ed. Frits Van der Leeden, Fred L. Troise, David Keith Todd. Chelsea, Mich.: Lewis Publishers, 1990. (Geraghty and Miller Ground-Water Series). ISBN 0-87371-120-3.
- Battling the Inland Sea: Floods, Public Policy, and the Sacramento Valley / by Robert Kelley. Berkeley: University of California Press, c1989. (Reprinted: Berkeley: University of California Press, 1998. ISBN 0-520-21428-5).
- Rivers of Empire: Water, Aridity & the Growth of the American West / by Donald Worster. New York: Pantheon Books, c1985. ISBN 0-394-51680-X.
- From the Family Farm to Agribusiness: The Irrigation Crusade in California and the West, 1850–1931 / by Donald J. Pisani. Berkeley: University of California Press, c1984. ISBN 0-520-05127-0.
- Water and Power: The Conflict Over Los Angeles' Water Supply in the Owens Valley / by William L. Kahrl. Berkeley: University of California Press, 1982. ISBN 0-520-04431-2 (cloth); 0-520-05068-1 (pbk.).
- A River No More: The Colorado River and the West / by Philip L. Fradkin. New York: Alfred A. Knopf, 1981. 0-394-41579-5. (Reprinted: Tucson: The University of Arizona Press, 1984, ISBN 0-8165-0823-2; Expanded and updated: Berkeley: University of California Press, 1996, ISBN 0-520-20564-2)
- The California Water Atlas / by William L. Kahrl, project director and editor. Sacramento: The Governor's Office of Planning and Research; Los Altos, Calif.: distributed by William Kaufmann, 1979. ISBN 0-913232-68-8.
- The Sacramento-San Joaquin Delta : The Evolution and implementation of Water Policy : An Historical Perspective / by W. Turrentine Jackson and Alan M. Paterson: California Water Resources Center; Davis, California, 1977. Technical Completion Report no. 163.
- Water and the West: The Colorado River Compact and the Politics of Water in the American West / by Norris Hundley, Jr. Berkeley: University of California Press, 1975. ISBN 0-520-02700-0.
