= John E. Skinner Delta Fish Protective Facility =

Coordinates: 37.82549°N 121.59593°W

The John E. Skinner Delta Fish Protective Facility or the Skinner Fish Facility is a fish collection and diversion facility located 2 miles upstream from the Banks Pumping Plant. In operation since 1968 by the California Department of Water Resources, the facility utilizes behavioral devices (fish screens) that divert most fish away from the pumping plant. Fish that make it past the behavior devices are collected into concrete tanks where they are later released back into the Sacramento River or the San Joaquin River.

== Fish collection ==
Fish too small to swim against the current or make it past the louvers are guided and collected in four steps. In the first step, the fish follow the intake flow from Clifton Court Forebay where a floating trash boom and trash rack divert larger fish and trash away from the intake channel. The second step utilizes large metal louvers to cause rippling in the water, which creates a turbulence that the smaller fish avoid and swim away into bypass pipes. In the third step, the bypass pipe takes the fish through series of secondary louvers and screens which lead to a secondary channel which separates the fish into a manageable amount of water. By the fourth and final step, the fish are placed into seven 20-foot diameter concrete tanks that each hold 10 to 12 feet of water. Once the fish are in the tanks, they are identified, counted, and measured before being transported back upstream via trucks.

Some common fish collected at the facility include Chinook salmon, Striped bass, Sacramento blackfish, and the Delta Smelt.

An annual total of around 15 million fish are saved from the waterpumps.
