= California Water Plan =

Strategic plan for managing and developing water resources

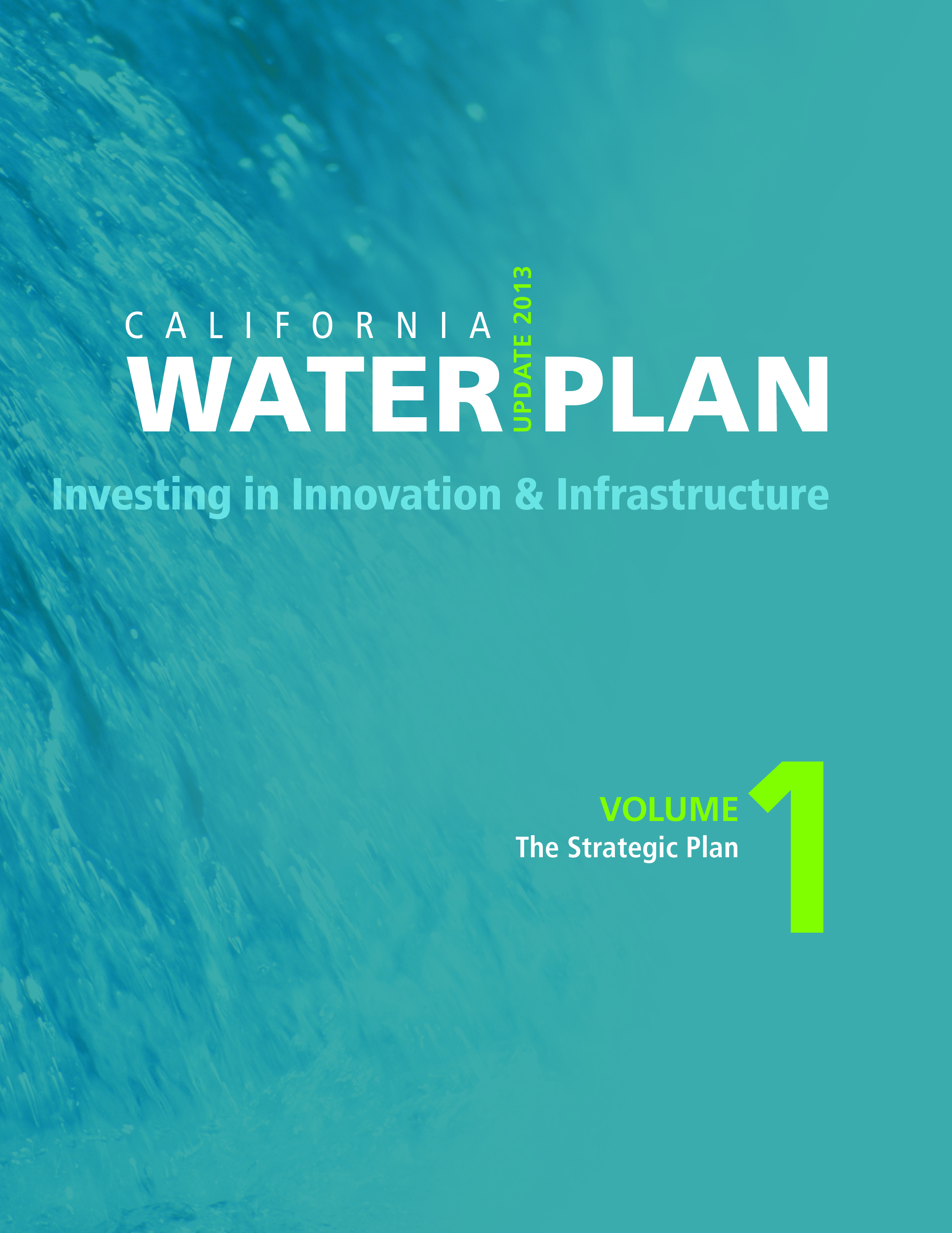
Volume 1, The Strategic Plan: Investing in Innovation and Infrastructure, of Update 2013.

The California Water Plan (Water Plan) is the State of California’s long-term strategic plan for managing and developing water resources throughout the state. The Water Plan is mandated by California Water Code Sections 10004–10013, and the California Department of Water Resources (DWR) is required to update the plan every five years. Although the Water Plan does not create mandates, propose specific projects, or authorize funding, Water Code Section 10005 defines the plan and its updates as “the master plan which guides the orderly and coordinated control, protection, conservation, development, management and efficient utilization of the water resources of the state”. Twelve updates to the plan have been prepared since 1957.

== History ==
The development of water plans in California date back to the 19th century. Since then, they have taken several different formats and titles. The first plan was put together in 1873. It covered ideas for water distribution in the state. In 1919, a report, titled “Irrigation of Twelve Million Acres in the Valley of California,” provided the first comprehensive plan for water management. It is often referred to as the “Marshall Plan,” after its author, Col. Robert Bradford Marshall. In the decades following the release of that report, many water plans were issued as DWR bulletins (formal publications that include approved, official information to the governor, legislature, other government agencies, as well as the public).

The initial Water Plan (known as Bulletin 3) was released in 1957 under the direction of DWR’s first director, Harvey Oren Banks (March 29, 1910 – September 22, 1996). A civil engineer, he was appointed State Engineer of California in 1955. A year later he was placed in charge of DWR. The Water Plan was intended for “the control, protection, conservation, distribution, and utilization of the waters of California, to meet present and future needs for all beneficial uses and purposes in all areas of the state to the maximum feasible extent.” Gov. Pat Brown would later say it was to “correct an accident of people and geography.”

That first Water Plan, in 1957, and several updates that followed were, for the most part, technical documents focused on water supply development. The plans were gradually expanded to reflect the growing conflicts over California’s limited water resources.

In March 1966, Implementation of the California Water Plan was released as Bulletin 160. All subsequent updates to the Water Plan have been issued under that bulletin number.

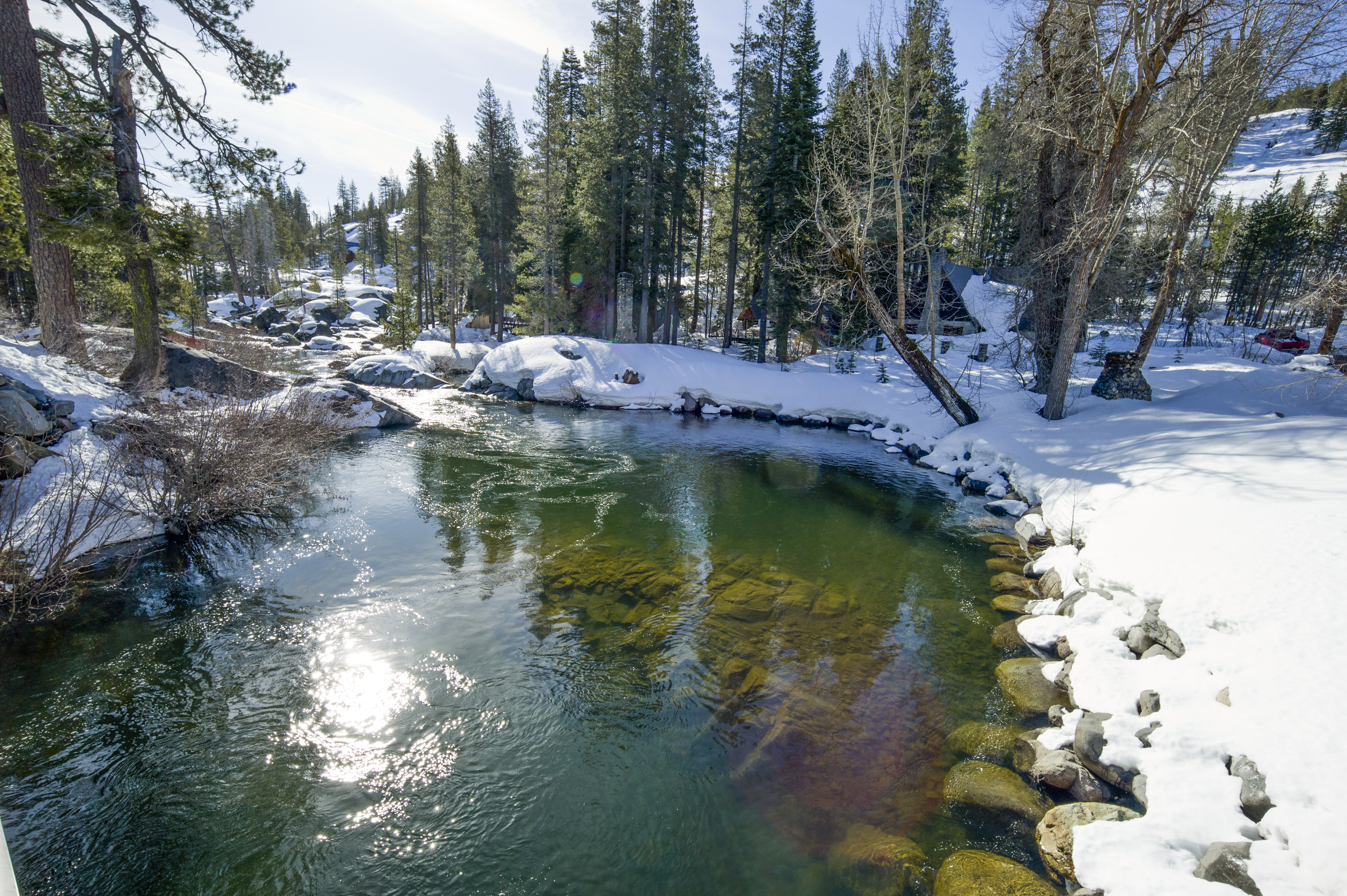
The Sierra Nevada snowpack is the state’s largest surface “reservoir,” providing an average of 15 million acre-feet of water per year, mostly between April and July.

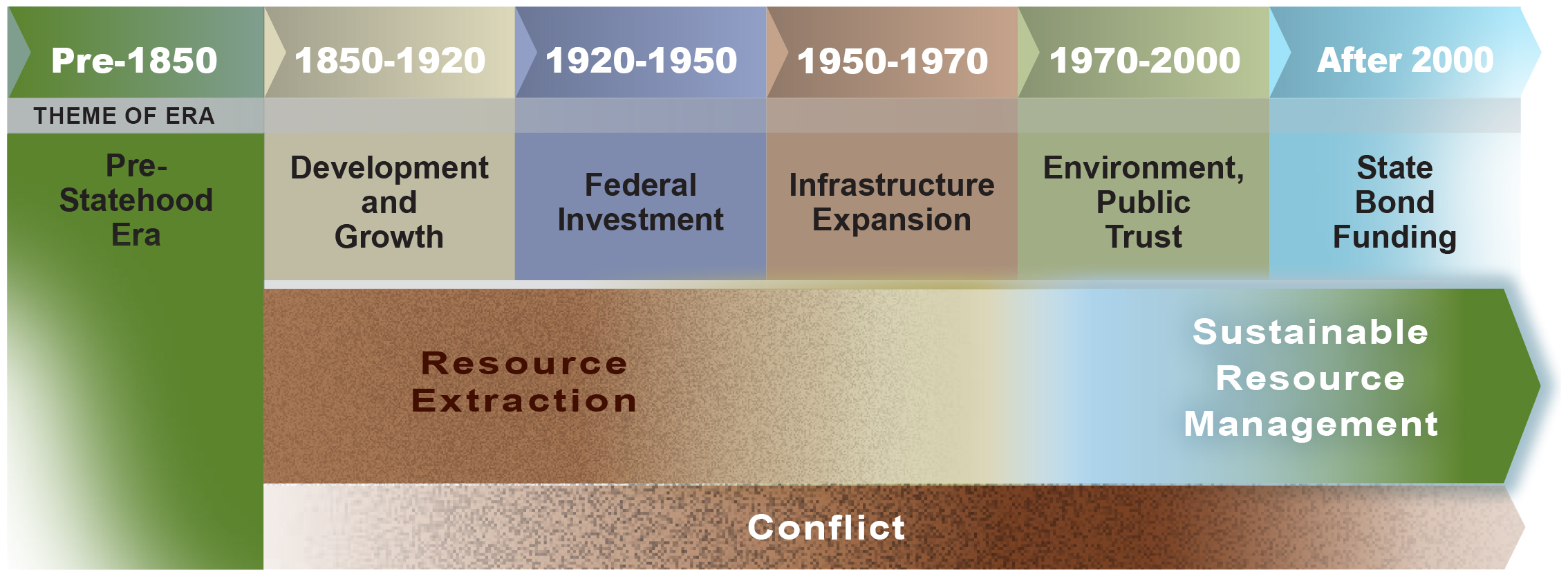
Since the earliest days of statehood, California has invested in water and flood management infrastructure to promote growth and economic development. A period of resource extraction led to a booming economy, while at the same time creating a number of unintended consequences, including environmental degradation. Environmental laws and regulations were enacted in the latter part of the 20th century to help remedy the consequences and restore the environment.

A new approach was established to produce the 1993 update. DWR worked with an advisory committee composed of a diverse group of stakeholders with the aim of making the Water Plan an all the “more technically accurate and politically balanced document.” Beginning with the 1998 update, the Water Plan has moved beyond providing pure information to evaluating options for addressing future water shortages, even as extensive and early public input has been sought for each update. The approach involves dialogue and exchanges among Water Plan teams, committees, stakeholders, and the public. The sessions provide multiple opportunities for review by different audiences and feedback from a variety of perspectives. This transparent, collaborative, consensus-seeking process has been used by other agencies and states as a model for policy-planning efforts.

California Water Plan Update 2013 (Update 2013) had the added element of meshing with Gov. Edmund G. Brown Jr.’s California Water Action Plan. The governor’s five-year plan, released in January 2014, outlines actions intended to bring reliability, restoration, and resilience to California’s water resources. It takes into account an anticipated population increase from the current 38 million, to an estimated 50 million by 2049.

== Commitment to Integrated Water Management ==
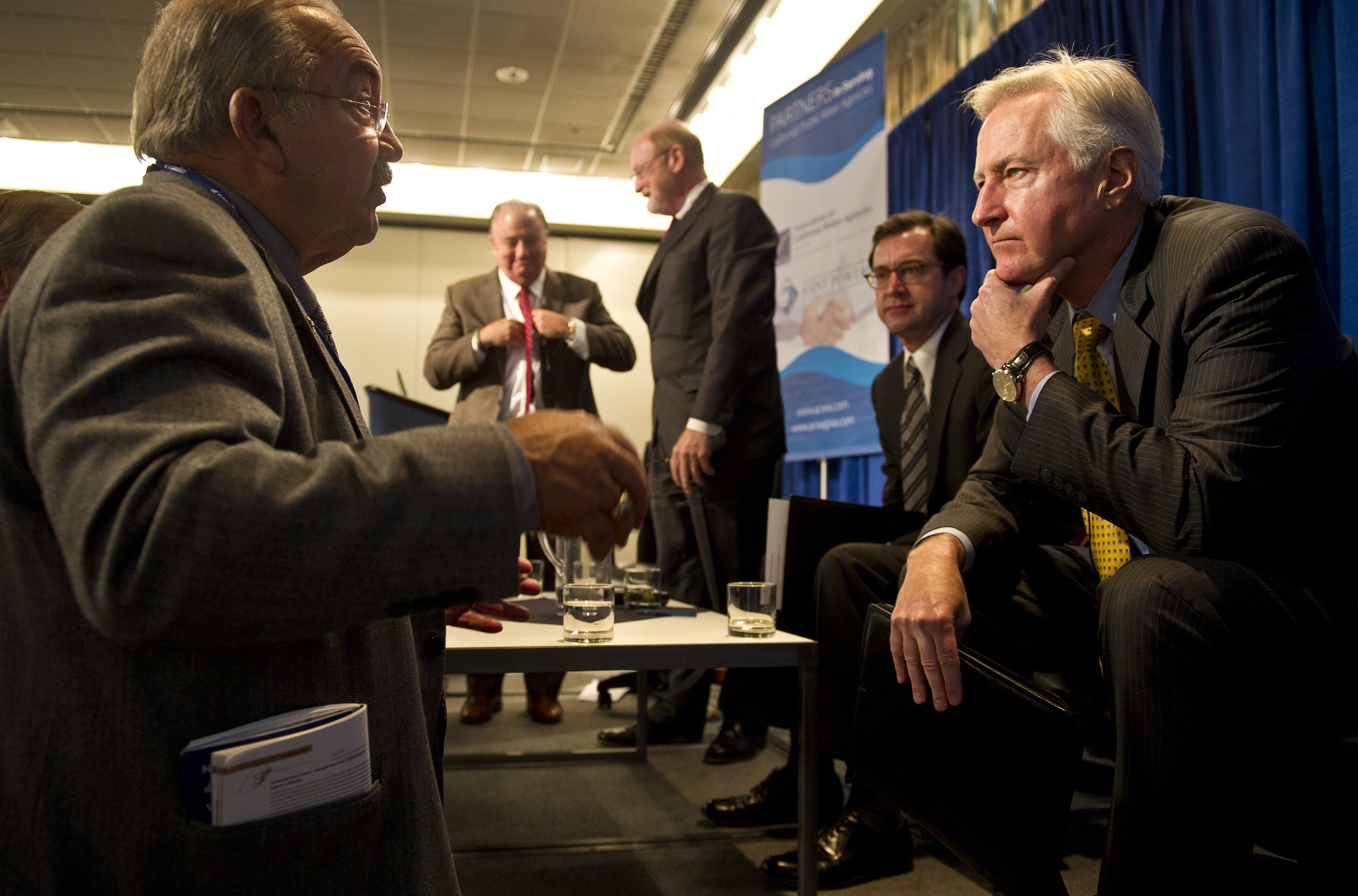
Foreground: Mark Cowin (right), Director of DWR, converses with Dick Quigley, Director of Zone 7 Water Agency, as Gordon Burns, Undersecretary for the California Environmental Protection Agency, listens in after a panel discussion at the Association of California Water Agencies’ (ACWA’s) Spring Conference and Exhibition at the Sacramento Convention Center. Background: John Laird, California Secretary for Natural Resources, talks with John Coleman, President of the ACWA. The panel focused on drought and its impact on the state’s economy and environment. May 6, 2015.

According to Chris Austin, of Maven’s Notebook, an independent and comprehensive source of California water news and information, “three related themes distinguish California Water Plan Update 2013.” DWR and other State agencies consider the three themes critical to securing California’s water future.

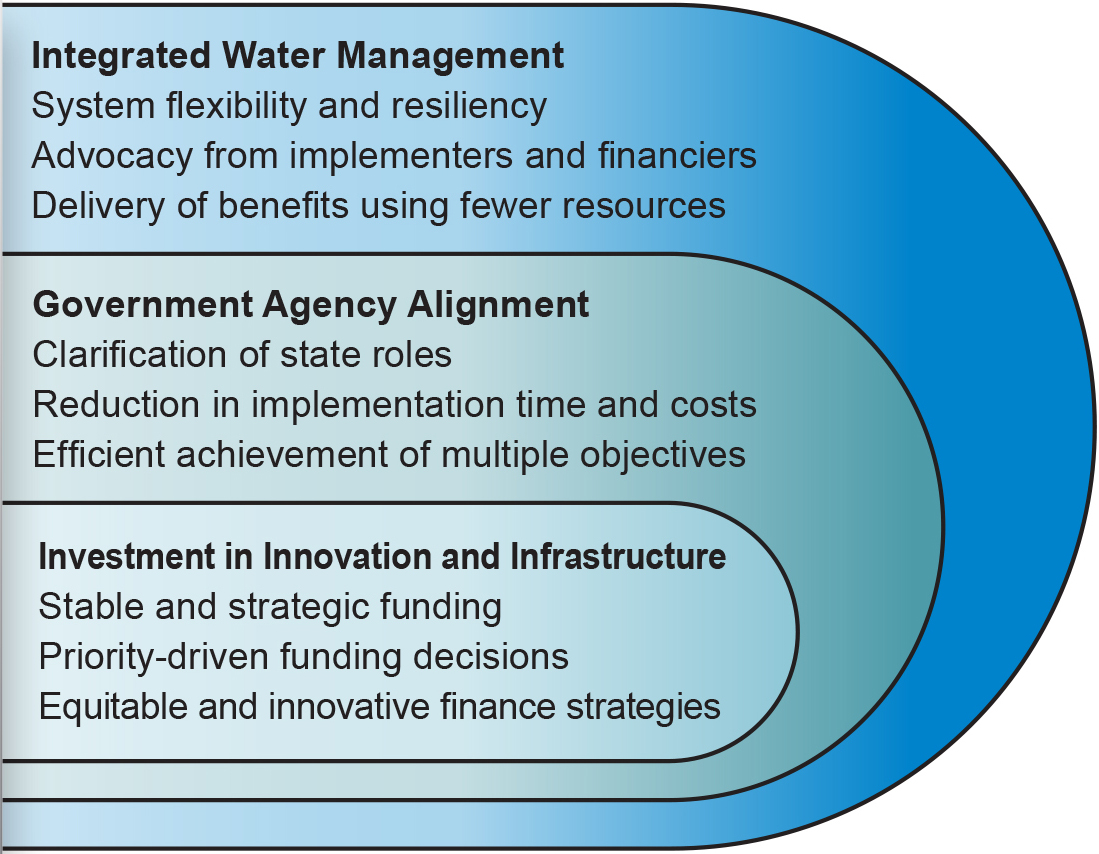
- Three Themes Graphic from Update 2013.
  Commit to Integrated Water Management: Integrated water management (IWM) promises to provide multiple benefits across the state’s diverse stakeholder communities and accelerate implementation of water projects by generating broader support.
- Strengthen Government Agency Alignment: A key principle of IWM seeks to improve the way governments interact and ultimately deliver services. Aligning agencies in a collaborative manner, across jurisdictional boundaries at the appropriate geographic scale, provides for more efficiency in addressing water problems. The alignment would include management of data, planning, policy-making, and regulation across local, State, tribal, and federal governments.
- Invest in Innovation and Infrastructure: To reduce flood risk, provide reliable water supplies, and protect ecosystems, California will need up to $200 billion over the next 10 years just to maintain current levels of service and system conditions. It is projected that California will need up to $500 billion in future investment over the next few decades to reduce flood risk, provide reliable and clean water supplies, and restore and enhance ecosystems.

The Santa Margarita Conjunctive Use Project in San Diego County is cited as an example of the three themes in action. This conjunctive use project is designed to provide for enhanced recharge of the groundwater basin beneath the Marine Corps Base Camp Pendleton in northern San Diego County. It also includes a seawater intrusion barrier that uses recycled water, a distribution system, and advanced water treatment facilities. The project will provide a new water supply of about 6,800 acre-feet (8.4×10^{6} m^{3}) per year for Camp Pendleton and Fallbrook Public Utilities District, and will resolve a long-standing water rights dispute between Fallbrook and the federal government.

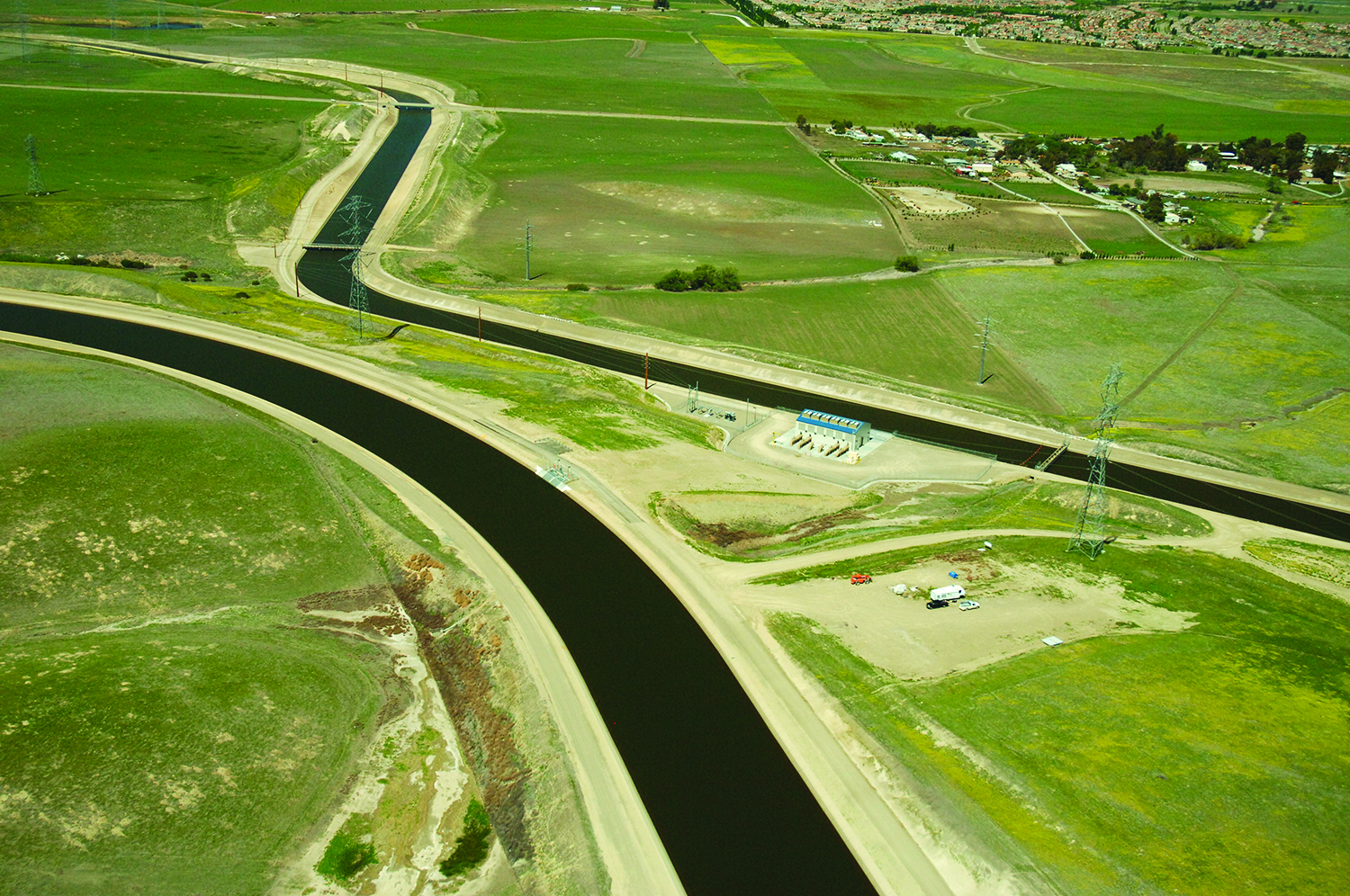
The intertie between the California Aqueduct and the Central Valley Delta-Mendota Canal allows for operational flexibility. These state and federal structures, respectively, meet at the O’Neill Forebay, part of the San Luis Joint-Use Complex.

Update 2013 includes the Highlights booklet, three primary volumes, and two reference volumes.

Highlights: This booklet provides an overview of the first three volumes.

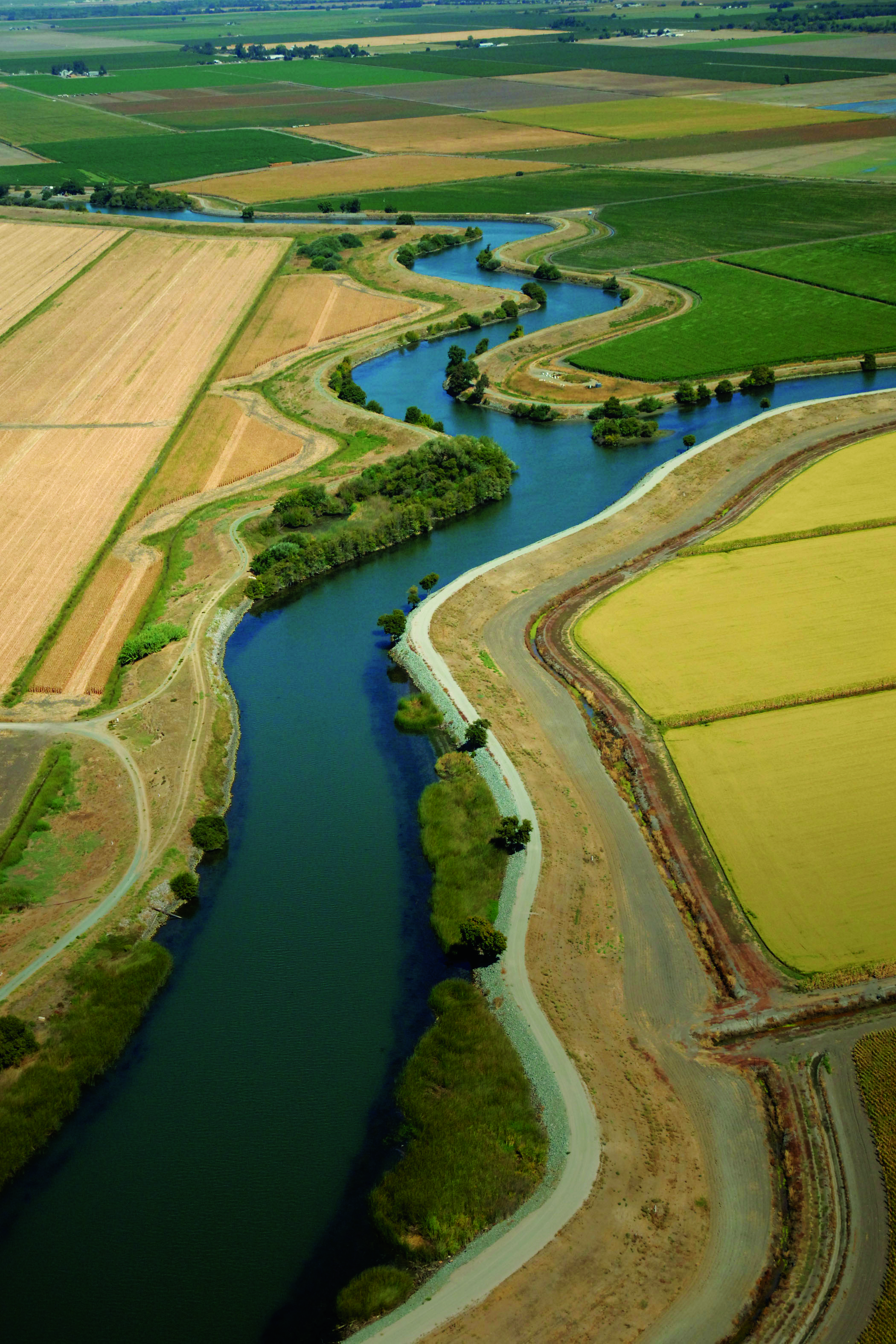
The San Francisco Bay/ Sacramento-San Joaquin Delta Estuary supplies water for much of California.

Volume 1 — The Strategic Plan: This volume looks at the current water issues in the state. It also provides a look at potential problems in the future, along with possible solutions. The Strategic Plan is presented in eight chapters, including “California Water Today” and “Roadmap for Action.”

Volume 2 — Regional Reports: California is divided into 10 hydrologic regions; this volume has a chapter on each one. There are also chapters on two overlay areas (the Sacramento-San Joaquin Delta and Mountain Counties) that don’t qualify as hydrologic regions, but deserve attention because of their contributions and importance to California’s water systems.

Volume 3 — Resource Management Strategies: A comprehensive set of 30 resource management strategies makes up this volume. Each one discusses a technique, program, or policy that helps local agencies and governments manage their water. The strategies are divided into seven categories: Reduce Water Demand, Improve Flood Management, Improve Operational efficiency and Transfers, Increase Water Supply, Improve Water Quality, Practice Resource Stewardship, and People and Water.

Volume 4 — Reference Guide: This guide provides detailed reference material related to information presented in the first three volumes.

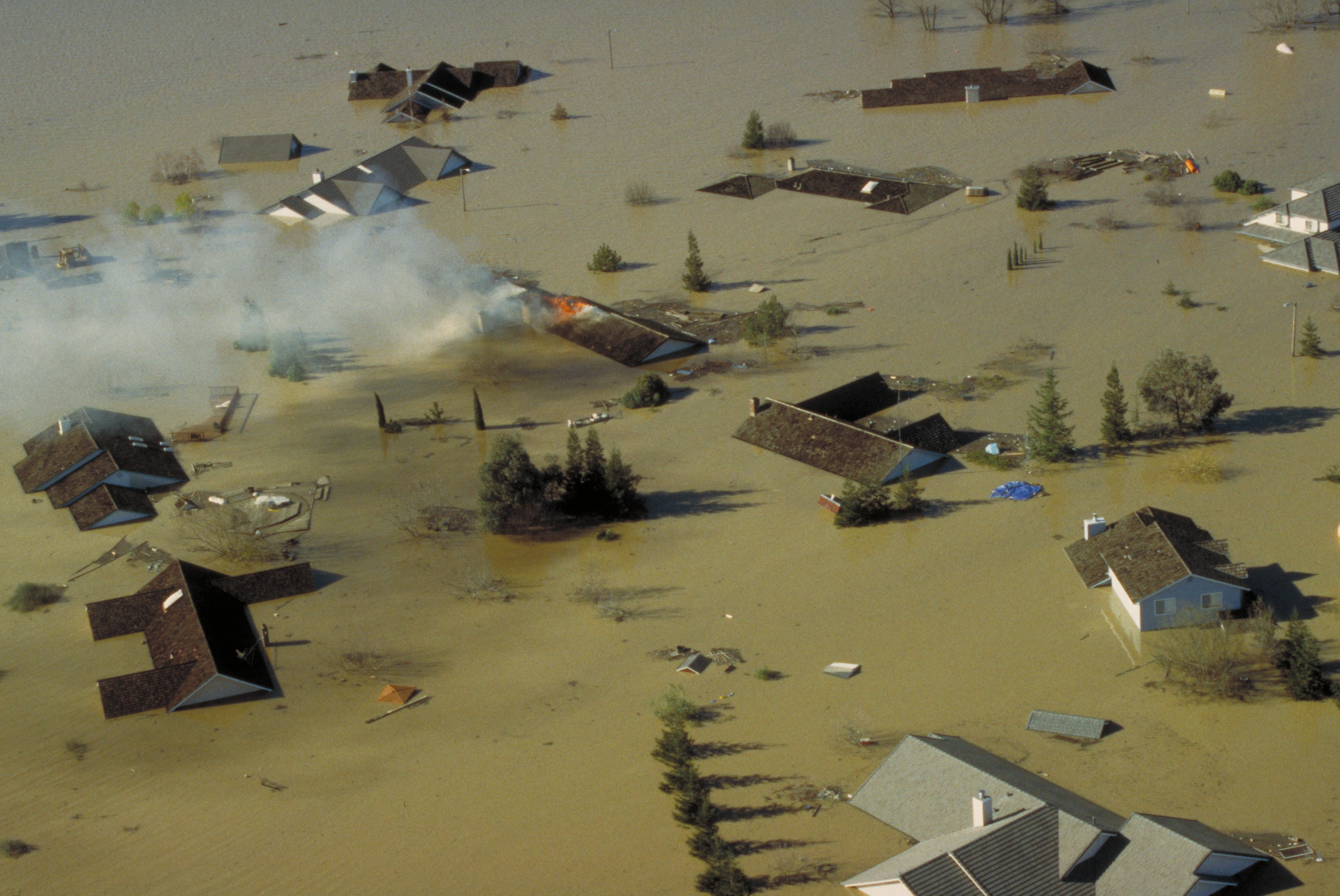
1997 Yuba City Flood.

Volume 5 — Technical Guide: Organized and formatted as a Web portal, the Technical Guide documents the assumptions, data, analytical tools, and methods used to prepare Update 2013.

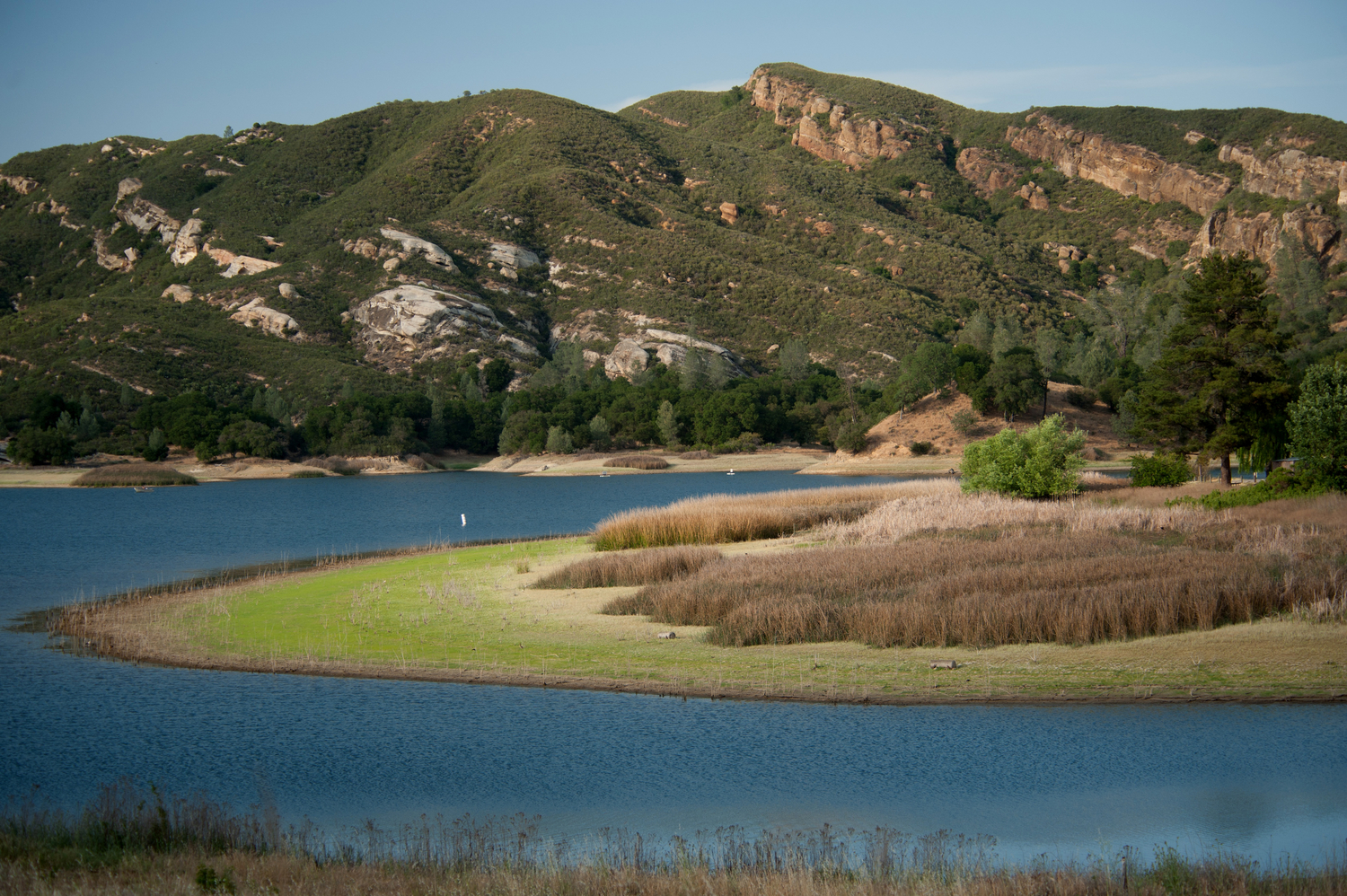
Santa Margarita River: With the Santa Margarita Conjunctive Use Project (San Diego County), surface water from the river would be diverted to groundwater percolation ponds.

The main purpose of the 2018 California Water Plan was to emphasize sustainability of water supplies, especially through the use of integrated water management and integrated regional water management. Some other key themes include promoting strengthening flood and river management. Update 2018 also included, for the first time, a five-year State investment strategy and companion finance plan. It was the first Water Plan update to “identify specific outcomes and metrics to track performance, prioritize near-term State actions and investments, recommend financing methods having more stable revenues, and inform water deliberations and decisions as they unfold”.

The California Department of water Resources has released the newest version of California’s Water Plan Update for the year 2023. The plan can be utilized by water districts, cities, counties and tribal communities to advise and direct the states use and development of its water resources. It targets three intersecting concepts including stressing climate urgency, stretching watershed resilience and achieving equity in water management. The 2023 plan update encourages climate resilience in water sectors and all throughout regions with a statewide vision, defined goals and an indicator dashboard that monitor's progress. For the first time a California water plan has dedicated an entire section to highlight the challenges, strengths, and resources of California Native American tribes. Moreover, the section was cowritten by members of the California Water Plan Tribal Advisory Committee. The California Water Plan 2023 update emphasizes the significance of working with local partners to develop watershed based solutions, climate resilience and equity throughout the state. A program made to better prepare and plan for a severe climate future known as the Watershed Resilience Program approaches the importance of collaborating with local communities. For example by offering financial and technical support to enhance regional resilience, the Watershed Resilience Program will furthermore the framework and vision outlined in the California Water Plan 2023 in order to facility the imperative of these strategies. The 2023 update promotes the idea that “All Californians benefit from water resources that are sustainable, resilient to climate change, and managed to achieve shared values and connections to our communities and the environment”.
