= Byron-Bethany Irrigation District =

Coordinates: 37.80978°N 121.60446°W

The Byron-Bethany Irrigation District (BBID) is a special district serving the water needs of regions of Alameda, Contra Costa, and San Joaquin Counties in California. This area is about 36,000 acres (15,000 ha) and serves over 300 agricultural customers, as well as residents of the all-inclusive Mountain House village community are served as well as the residents of the Tracy Hill Development in the City of Tracy. Notable recipients of BBID's services in the area are The Patterson Pass Business Park, Prologis International Park of Commerce, and Cordes Ranch. The water comes from the Sacramento–San Joaquin River Delta and the Delta–Mendota Canal.

== Merge with West Side Irrigation District ==
In December of 2016, under BBID general manager, Rick Gilmore, BBID operations were consolidated with West Side Irrigation District (WSID) and the two have been working as a joint district under the name Byron-Bethany Irrigation District. Before the merger, WSID primarily dealt with agricultural irrigation services, but since has retrofitted some of their ditches for drainage in the city of Tracy. This merger added 6,000 acres (2,400 ha) to the 30,000 BBID already managed. BBID also merged with Plainview Water District in 2004, adding 6,000 acres to the original 24,000 acres served.

== Assembly Bill 747 ==
The Byron-Bethany Irrigation District played an important role in backing AB 747. BBID rose to action when, during the 2015 California drought, they were accused of an unauthorized diversion of two thousand sixty-seven (2,067) acre-feet (2,549,603 m^{3}) from the intake channel of the Banks Pumping Plant (formerly Italian Slough) in Contra Costa County. According to the State Water Resources Control Board (SWRCB), BBID was in violation of California Water Code, Section 1052, and the district received an Administrative Civil Liability Complaint (ENF01951). However, before this complaint was issued, BBID had consulted the Contra Costa Superior Court about a Curtailment Notice received from the SWRCB, with hopes of addressing the water deficit predicament it put them in. More than a year later in June 2016, after multiple hearings and extensive correspondence, SWRCB dropped the Civil Liability Complaint due to insufficient evidence.

This experience pushed BBID to spearhead a new bill. BBID and other local irrigation districts reached out to the Brown Administration after a similar proposition, AB 313, was rejected in 2017. They urged a need to implement some type of checks and balances system on the SWRCB. AB 747 was passed in late September, 2018 and established an Administrative Hearings Office within the SWRCB. Its purpose is to act as a third party to oversee water rights issues; before the Board served as both the prosecutor and judge in enforcement cases. Attorney Alan Lilly, who has a background in law and water rights, was appointed the first Presiding Hearing Officer of the Administrative Hearings Office by the SWRCB.

== ACWA Water Leadership Award ==
The BBIG received the 2017 Excellence in Water Leadership Award from the Association of California Water Agencies (ACWA). The award was granted in observation of legal action the district took against the SWRCB during the 2015 California drought to ensure water rights for local residence and agricultural businesses. This legal action came after the SWRCB imposed a fine of up to $5 million on BBID for diverting water when its priority of right could not deliver. In 2016, the SWRCB dropped their charges due to insufficient evidence.
