= South Bay Pumping Plant =

In Alameda County, California, U.S.

Coordinates: 37°46′38″N 121°37′30″W

The South Bay Pumping Plant is located 4 miles (6 km) southwest of the Clifton Court Forebay and 10.3 miles (17 km) northeast of Livermore, CA. The plant is the only main line pumping plant for the 42.9 mile (69 km) long South Bay Aqueduct. The plant pumps from the Bethany Reservoir which is part of the California Aqueduct.

== Characteristics ==
- Number of units: 9
- Normal static head: 566 ft (173 m)
- Total flow at design head: 330 ft^{3}/s (9 m^{3}/s)
- Total motor rating: 27,500 hp (21 MW)

== Notes ==
Del Valle Pumping Plant is another pumping plant on the South Bay Aqueduct which pumps water into Lake Del Valle for storage.
