= Bethany Reservoir =

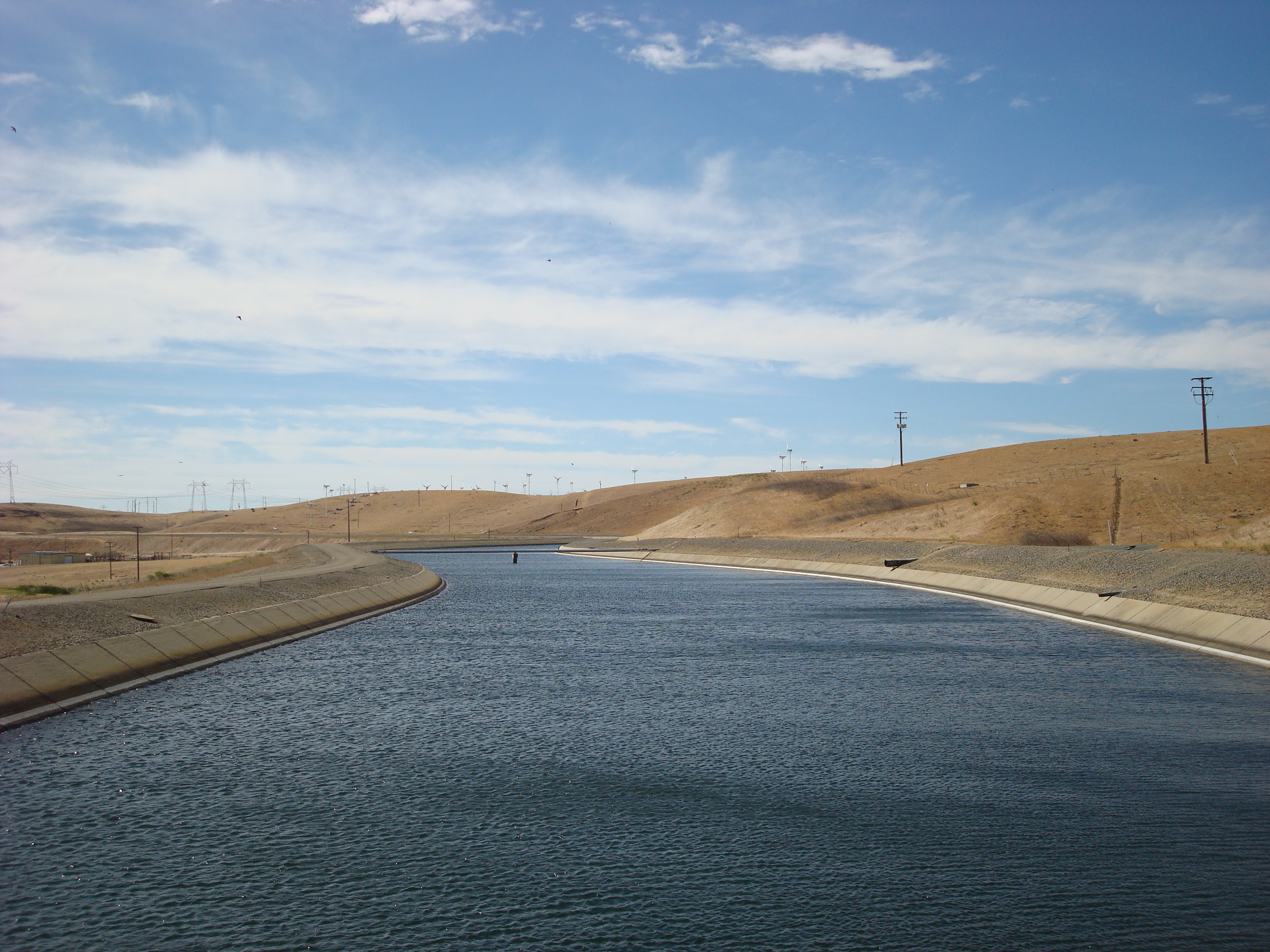
- Bethany Reservoir and aqueduct

- Location within California Location within the United States
- Location: Alameda County, California
- Coordinates: 37°46′36″N 121°36′24″W
- Type: reservoir
- Basin countries: United States
- Surface area: 180 acres (73 ha)
- Shore length^{1}: 6 miles (9.7 km)
- Surface elevation: 250 feet (76 m)
- ^{1} Shore length is not a well-defined measure.

Bethany Reservoir is located 8 miles (13 km) northeast of Livermore, in the northeastern corner of Alameda County, California, USA. It is the northern most part of the California Aqueduct, and receives water pumped by the Banks Pumping Plant from Clifton Court Forebay, which in turn receives waters pumped from the San Joaquin-Sacramento River Delta. It serves as the forebay for the South Bay Pumping Plant that feeds the South Bay Aqueduct and the main branch of the California Aqueduct which flows south along the west side of the San Joaquin Valley approximately 60 miles (97 km) to the O'Neill Forebay at the San Luis Reservoir.

== Characteristics ==
- Gross capacity: 5,250 acre-feet (6,480,000 m^{3})

== History ==
Bethany Reservoir was built between 1961 and 1967. A 110 foot tall earthen embankment was constructed. The reservoir is the starting point of the 444 mile, north-south California Aqueduct of the State Water Project. The Bethany Reservoir is the planned terminus of the Delta Conveyance Project.

The reservoir is named after Bethany, a town and ferry in San Joaquin County, which was probably named for the ancient town of Bethany in the State of Palestine. The town of Bethany was originally Mohr Station, named for John Mohr who sold the site to the Southern Pacific Railroad. Because it was confused with a Moore's Station, the name was changed.

== Ecology ==
A 1986 survey for the federally endangered San Joaquin kit fox (Vulpes macrotis mutica) in Contra Costa and Alameda Counties found the area around Bethany Reservoir to be the northernmost remaining range for the species. The smallest of the kit fox family, San Joaquin kit fox in this northern part of their range were noted to feed primarily on California ground squirrels (Otospermophilus beecheyi). Extirpation of the San Joaquin kit fox from even more northern Contra Costa County is thought due to poisoning of ground squirrels and depredation by red fox (Vulpes vulpes) and coyote (Canis latrans). Mesopredators of kit foxes, red fox and coyote populations were released by extirpation of gray wolves (Canis lupus) from most of California. However a 2003 survey using dogs and aerial surveillance found no remaining San Joaquin kit fox in Contra Costa or Alameda Counties.

== Recreation ==
Bethany Reservoir State Recreation Area surrounds Bethany Reservoir and is a popular place for water-oriented recreation, especially fishing and windsurfing. It also features a bike trail (along the California Aqueduct Bikeway).

== See also ==
- List of dams and reservoirs in California
- List of lakes in California
