= Harvey Oren Banks =

American civil engineer

- Born: March 29, 1910; Chaumont, New York, U.S.
- Died: September 22, 1996 (aged 86); Austin, Texas, U.S.
- Education: Syracuse University (BS, 1930); Stanford University (MS, 1933); UC Berkeley (PhD, 1964)
- Awards: National Academy of Engineering (1973); ASCE Julian Hinds Award (1976)
- Engineering career
- Projects: California State Water Project, California Water Plan, Harvey O. Banks Pumping Plant

Harvey Oren Banks (March 29, 1910 – September 22, 1996) was an American civil engineer who was appointed State Engineer of California in 1955 and the first Director of the California Department of Water Resources (DWR) in 1956. Under his direction, DWR completed its first California Water Plan and initiated the first stage of planning of the California State Water Project (SWP). It was under his term as Director that the California Legislature adopted the Burns-Porter Act authorizing the construction of the SWP in 1959. In 1961 voters approved massive bonds to pay for the construction of the SWP. Banks left the public sector that same year to return to the private sector, where he worked as a consulting engineer until his death in 1996. Banks' papers (1940-1995) are held at the Water Resources Collections and Archives, University of California, Riverside.

== Early career ==
Banks was a Magna Cum Laude civil engineering graduate of Syracuse University in 1930. He taught mathematics at Stanford University where he also earned a Masters of Science in hydraulic and sanitary engineering (two civil engineering specializations) in 1933. He then worked for the City of Palo Alto, California for two years before joining the U.S. Soil Conservation Service in 1935.

Banks joined the State of California's Division of Water Resources in 1938, but left the public engineering sector in 1942 to serve in the military through the duration of World War II in the US Army Corps of Engineers, with the 382 Combat Engineers. Following the war he joined a private engineering consulting firm.

== DWR years ==
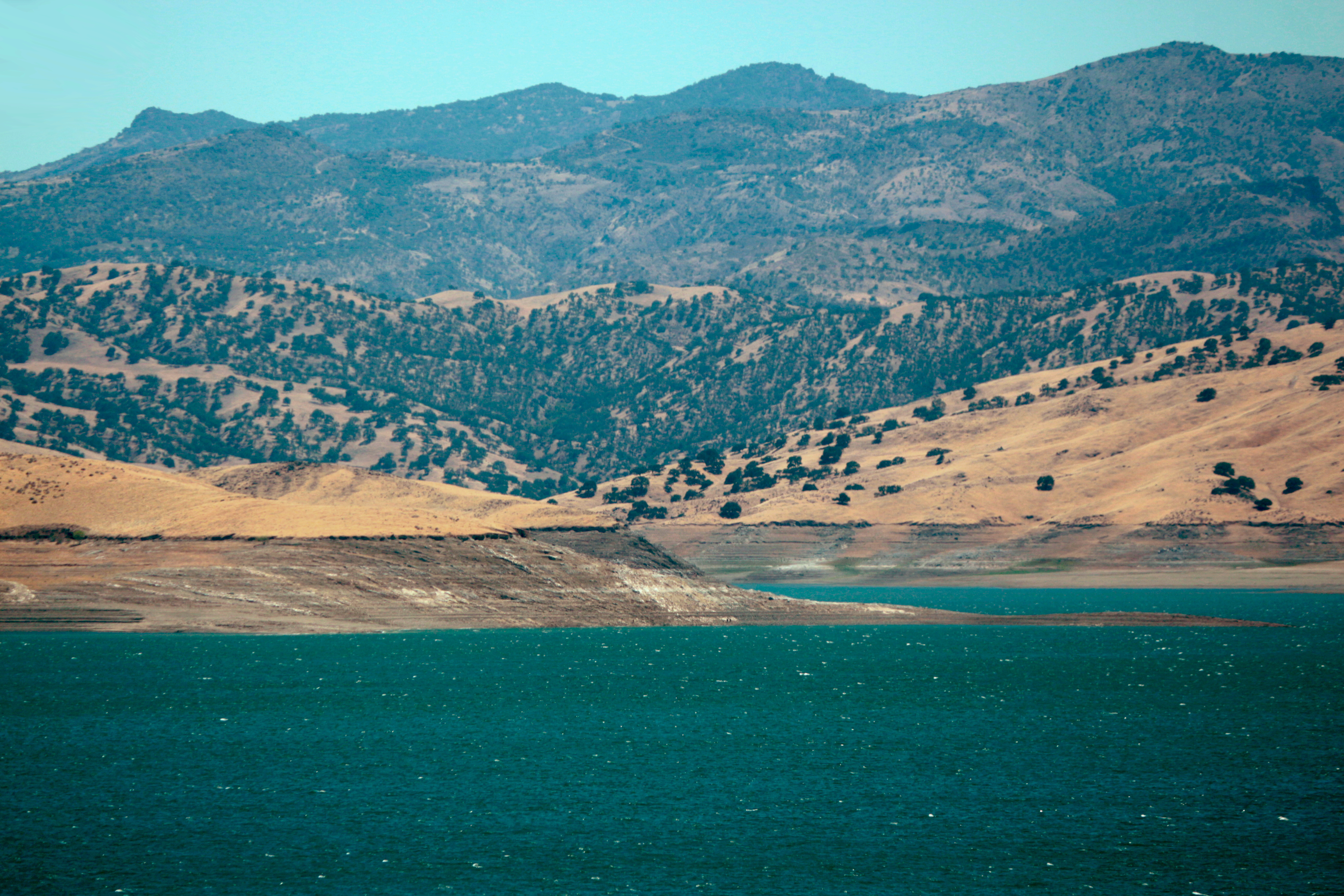
San Luis Reservoir in July 2021

In 1950 Banks returned to state service working in the Division of Water Resources newly formed Water Quality Program. In 1953 he was appointed Assistant State Engineer and was responsible for administrating water rights and water quality activities. He was promoted to the office of State Engineer in 1955 when he predecessor, Arthur D. Edmonston, retired.

Banks primary job as the State Engineer was to promote the authorization and construction of a water supply project that would transfer water from the northern part of California hundreds of miles to then quickly growing Southern California. As a strong advocate of the Burns-Porter Act of 1956, Banks was named the first Director of the newly created California Department of Water Resources. Banks and California Governor Pat Brown campaigned heavily for the next several years for the public approval of the California Water Resources Development Bond Act of 1960. The $1.75 billion bond measure provided the state the resources needed to build the reservoirs, pumping stations, and aqueducts that formed the California State Water Project.

The original SWP design plans did not call for the creation of a large off-stream storage reservoir along the California Aqueduct, however, Banks and others advocated that the original design be altered. Their design called for the creation of a large multi-use facility near Los Banos, California that could also tie into the US Federal Government's pre-existing Central Valley Project. This combined facility, later named San Luis Reservoir, would offer both projects flexibility. San Luis Reservoir was instrumental in enabling the complex water marketing that characterizes today's water management in California.

== Late career ==
In 1961, Banks left the Department of Water Resources, and returned to both the private sector as a consulting engineer and to school in order to pursue a Ph.D. He received his Ph.D. in agricultural economics from the University of California, Berkeley in 1964, and joined the University of Washington faculty in 1965. He frequently served as an expert witness in US and state courts on various water resources management and water law cases, and also was a member of many water related committees for organizations including the World Bank, United Nations, and the US Agency for International Development.

Banks continued to work as a consulting engineer until his death from leukemia in 1996.

== Honors ==
- Elected Member of the National Academy of Engineering, 1973.
- The California State Water Project pumping plant at the head of the California Aqueduct near Tracy, California was renamed in honor of Banks on June 2, 1981.
