= California Institute for Water Resources =

US research institute in California

Coordinates: 33.9645°N 117.3364°W

The California Institute for Water Resources (formerly the University of California Water Resources Center) was an interdisciplinary research institute dedicated to developing and coordinating a system-wide approach to water conservation. The center was funded by the California State Legislature in 1957, and was located on the original 1907 site of the UC Citrus Experiment Station on Mount Rubidoux in Riverside County, California. WRC was administered by the UC Division of Agriculture and Natural Resources (ANR). It collected historic and other documents related to water topics through the Water Resources Center Archives (WRCA) (located on the UC Riverside campus) and made the collection available to the public.

ANR announced the impending closure of WRC on October 2, 2009. WRC officially closed on December 31, 2009. The website, publications and data continue to be hosted by WRCA.
