= Western Waters Digital Library =

American digital library

The Western Waters Digital Library (WWDL) provides free public access to digital collections of significant primary and secondary resources on water in the western United States. These collections have been made available by research libraries other academic and institutional partners.

WWDL allows searchers to link to reports, photographs, correspondence, and legal documents. Some of the most significant people and events in water law and water history are featured on the site. For example, WWDL links to digitized items from the Papers of Delph E. Carpenter, known as the "Father of Interstate Water Compacts." Papers from other important individuals which have been linked to the site include Joseph B. Lippincott, Frank A. Banks, Wallace A. Bennett, and John S. Boyden.

WWDL is a valuable resource for researchers, policy makers, scholars, Native American tribes, professionals working in various fields, and others interested in contemporary and historic water issues.

== History ==
WWDL began as a collaborative regional project created by twelve research libraries from eight western states under the auspices of the Greater Western Library Alliance (GWLA). Funding for WWDL has been provided by the National Endowment for the Humanities (NEH) and the Institute of Museum and Library Services (IMLS).

Since its inception in 2004, WWDL has expanded to include water-related materials for twenty-five archival holding institutions including: Arizona State University; Brigham Young University; California Institute of Technology; Claremont Colleges; Colorado State University; Humboldt State University; Iowa State University; Northern State University; Oregon Institute of Technology; Oregon State University; Texas A&M University; University of Arizona; University of Idaho; University of Hawaiʻi at Mānoa; University of Nebraska–Lincoln; University of Nevada, Las Vegas; University of New Mexico; University of Oregon; University of the Pacific; University of Texas at Austin; University of Utah; Utah State University; University of Washington; Washington State University; and the Water Resources Collections and Archives at University of California, Riverside.

== See also ==
- John Wesley Powell
- Powell Geographic Expedition of 1869
- William Mulholland
- Owens Valley
- California Water Wars
- Hoover Dam
- Grand Coulee Dam
- Los Angeles Department of Water and Power
- Central Arizona Project
- Teton Dam
- St. Francis Dam
- Beyond the Hundredth Meridian: John Wesley Powell and the Second Opening of the West by Wallace Stegner
- Cadillac Desert by Mark Reisner
- Irrigated Eden by Mark Fiege
- Rivers of Empire: Water, Aridity, and the Growth of the American West by Donald Worster
