= Edmonston Pumping Plant =

California Aqueduct pumping station

- California Aqueduct infrastructure
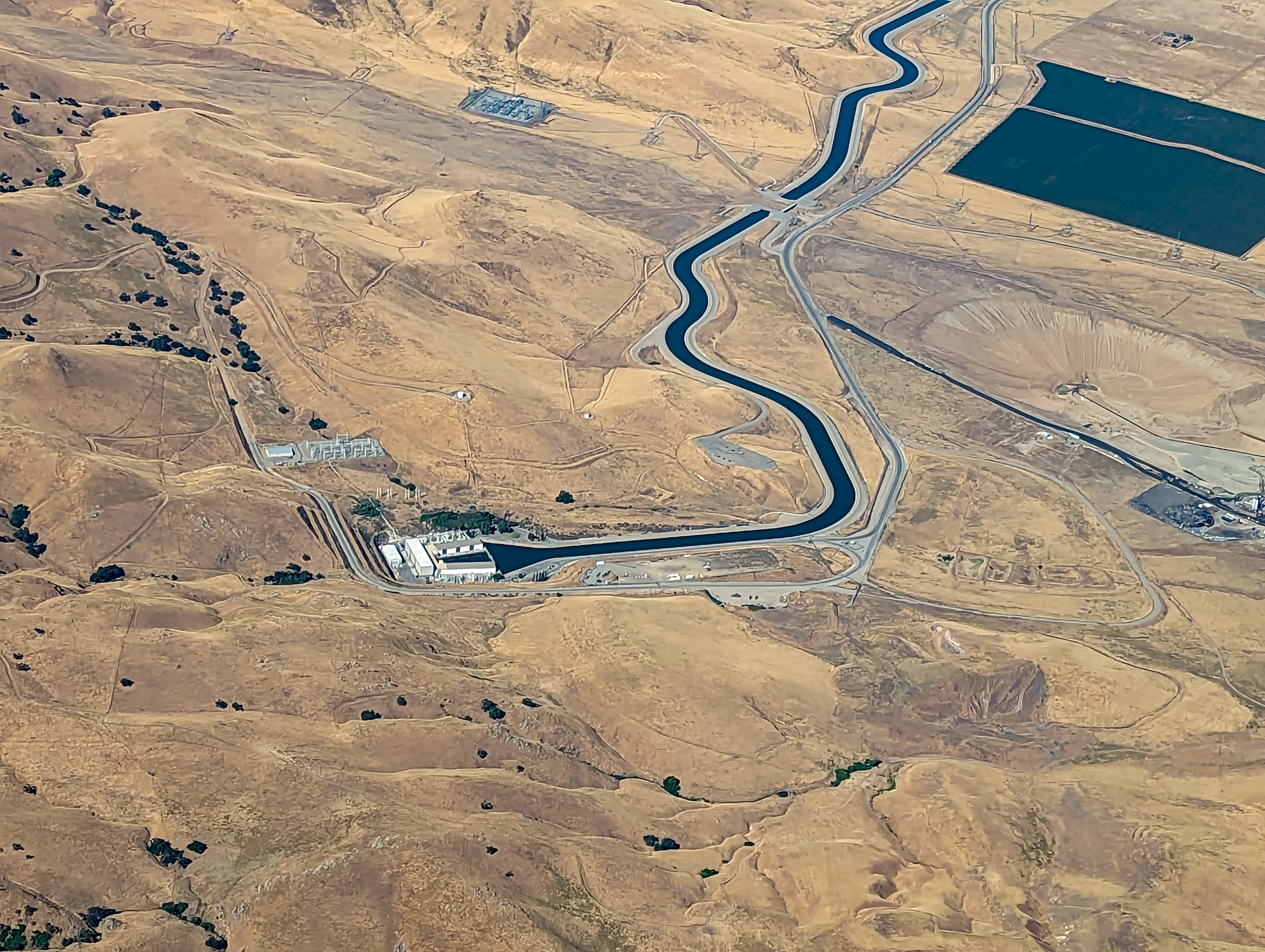
- Edmonston Pumping Plant, aerial view
- Manager: California Department of Water Resources
- Location: Tehachapi Mountains, California
- Interactive map of Edmonston Pumping Plant
- Coordinates: 34°56′32.5″N 118°49′28.79″W

A. D. Edmonston Pumping Plant is a pumping station near the south end of the California Aqueduct, which is the principal feature of the California State Water Project. It lifts water 1,926 feet (587 m) to cross the Tehachapi Mountains, after which it splits into the west and east branches of the California Aqueduct to serve Southern California. It is the most powerful water-lifting system in the world, other than pumped-storage hydroelectricity stations.

== Description ==
There are 14 4-stage 80,000 horsepower (60 MW) centrifugal pumps that push the water up to the top of the mountain. Each motor-pump unit stands 65 feet (20 m) high and weighs 420 tons. The pumps themselves extend downward six floors. Each unit discharges water into a manifold that connects to the main discharge lines. The two main discharge lines stairstep up the mountain in an 8,400-foot-long (2,600 m) tunnel. They are 12.5 feet (3.8 m) in diameter for the first half and 14 feet (4.3 m) in diameter for the last half. They each contain 8.5×10^{6} US gallons (3.2×10^{4} m^{3}) of water at all times. At full capacity, the pumps can fling nearly 2×10^{6} US gallons (7.6×10^{3} m^{3}) per minute up over the Tehachapis. A 68-foot-high (21 m), 50-foot-diameter (15 m) surge tank is located at the top of mountain. This prevents tunnel damage when the valves to the pumps are suddenly open or closed. Near the top of the lift, there are valves which can close the discharge lines to prevent backflow into the pumping plant below in event of a rupture.

== Electric power ==
The station needs up to 787 MW of electricity, delivered through a dedicated 230kV transmission line from the nearby Southern California Edison Pastoria substation.

== Characteristics ==
- Number of units: 14 (two galleries of 7)
- Normal static head: 1,970 ft (600 m)
- Motor rating: 80,000 hp (60 MW) each
- Total motor rating: 1,120,000 hp (840 MW))
- Flow per motor at design head: 315 cu ft/s (8.9 m^{3}/s)
- Total flow at design head: 4,410 cu ft/s (125 m^{3}/s)
