= Banks Pumping Plant =

California Aqueduct pumping station

Coordinates: 37°48′03″N 121°37′15″W

The Harvey O. Banks Pumping Plant is located 2.5 miles (4.0 km) southwest of the Clifton Court Forebay and 12 miles (19 km) northwest of Tracy, CA. The plant is the first pumping plant for the California Aqueduct and the South Bay Aqueduct. It provides the necessary fluid head (potential energy) for the California Aqueduct to flow for approximately 80 miles (130 km) south past the O'Neill Forebay and the San Luis Reservoir to the Dos Amigos Pumping Plant. The Banks Pumping Plant initially flows into the Bethany Reservoir. It is from the Bethany Reservoir that the South Bay Aqueduct begins.

The John E. Skinner Delta Fish Protective Facility is located 2 miles upstream from the facility and prevents fishes from reaching the pumping plant.

Limits on water pumping from the Sacramento Delta is a politically contentious issue. In dry years, water pumped from the Delta creates a hazard to spring-run salmon. As the Banks Pumping Plant pulls water from the Sacramento River southward across the Delta, it disrupts the normal flow direction of east to west that salmon smolt follow to the Pacific Ocean. Populations of salmon and steelhead trout have reached critically low levels in the decades after SWP water withdrawals began. The fish migration issue has become hotly contested in recent years, with rising support for the construction of the Peripheral Canal, which would divert water around the Delta, restoring the natural flow direction.

== Characteristics ==
- Number of units: 11
- Normal static head: 236 to 252 ft (72 to 77 m)
- Total flow at design head: 10,920 ft³/s (302 m³/s) (21,659 acre-feet/day)
- Total motor rating: 333,000 hp (248 MW)
