= Bethany Reservoir State Recreation Area =

California state park

- Location within California Location within the United States
- Location: Alameda County, California, United States
- Nearest city: Livermore, California
- Coordinates: 37°46′45″N 121°36′36″W
- Area: 609 acres (246 ha)
- Established: 1974
- Governing body: California Department of Parks and Recreation

Bethany Reservoir State Recreation Area is a state park unit of California, United States, adjoining the Bethany Reservoir. It is located in Alameda County, near Livermore.

Situated in the northernmost part of the San Joaquin Valley, Bethany Reservoir State Recreation Area is a popular place for water-oriented recreation, especially fishing and windsurfing. The reservoir stores water for a pumping plant on the California Aqueduct.

== See also ==
- List of California state parks
