= Dos Amigos Pumping Plant =

Water pumping plant in Merced County, California

Coordinates: 36.923889°N 120.827778°W

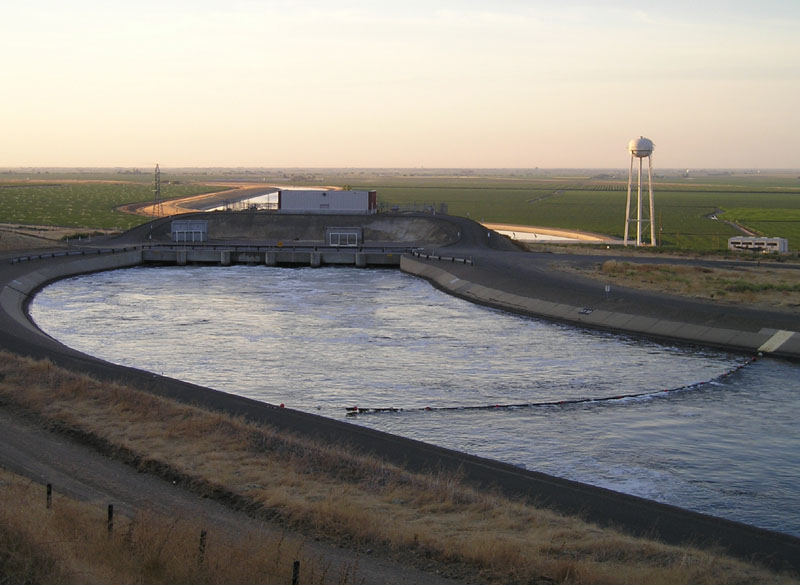
Dos Amigos Pumping Plant (view to north).

The Dos Amigos Pumping Plant is a water pumping plant, constructed between 1963 and 1966 as part of the California State Water Project. It is able to withhold and transport water between Northern and Southern California through an approximately 444 mile aqueduct. It is located in Central California's San Joaquin Valley along Interstate 5, about 10 miles (16 kilometers) south of Los Banos in Merced County.

The plant is the second pumping plant for the California Aqueduct and the South Bay Aqueduct. It provides the necessary fluid head (potential energy) for the California Aqueduct to flow for approximately 95 miles (153 km) to where the Coastal Branch splits from the "main line" approximately 10 miles (16 km) south-southeast of Kettleman City.

After the Coastal Branch junction, the line continues south by gravity another 66 miles (106 km) to the Buena Vista Pumping Plant.

The California Aqueduct is made up of small bodies of water such as canals and tunnels that are able to transport water. The aqueduct starts at the Clifton Court Forebay in Sacramento and makes its way down South where it splits into three different branches that is broken up into different areas of the counties down South. These categories include West Branch, East Branch, and Coastal Branch.

As the aqueduct flows through California it goes through many reservoirs such as San Luis Reservoir. From the San Luis Reservoir to the O'Neill Forebay, the water flows down into the Dos Amigos Pumping Plant which is approximately 16 miles. After going through Dos Amigos Pumping Plant It reaches the Coastal Branch that is split for across a line that goes for about 16 miles towards Kettleman City.

== Specifications ==
- Units: 6
- Normal static head: 118 ft (36 m)
- Total flow at design head: 15,450 ft^{3} (437 m^{3}) per second
- Lift: 118ft and 74m
- Longitude: -120.8288º
- Latitude: 36.92384º
- Elevation: 282 ft

== See also ==
- Clifton Court Forebay
- O'Neill Forebay
- Central Valley Project
- Water in California
