= Harvey Washington Banks =

- Born: February 7, 1923
- Died: 1979 (aged 55–56)
- Education: Howard University, Georgetown University
- Scientific career
- Fields: Astronomy
- Institutions: Howard University, Georgetown University, Delaware State University
- Doctoral advisor: Francis Joseph Heyden, Matthew Pothen Thekaekara

Harvey Washington Banks (February 7, 1923 – 1979) was a professor of physics and astronomy at Howard University and was the first African American to earn a doctorate specifically in the field of astronomy.

== Early life and education ==
Banks was born in Atlantic City, New Jersey. At an early age, his family moved to Washington, D.C. where he would later attend Dunbar High School (Washington, D.C.). Banks then attended Howard University where he earned his bachelor's degree in physics in 1946 and a master's degree in physics in 1948. Banks would later attend Georgetown University, completing his Ph.D. in Astronomy in 1961.

== Teaching and Research ==
Shortly after receiving his doctorate, Banks would become an assistant professor of astronomy at Georgetown University from 1962 to 1966. Later becoming a professor of physics and astronomy at Delaware State University, in addition to being appointed director of the school's observatory. He would return to Howard University in 1969 being appointed associate professor of astronomy. At Howard University he would expand his research, also working in the field of Geodesy using measurements taken from solar eclipses and satellites.

Prof. Banks died in 1979.
