= California Aqueduct =

Water supply project in California, US

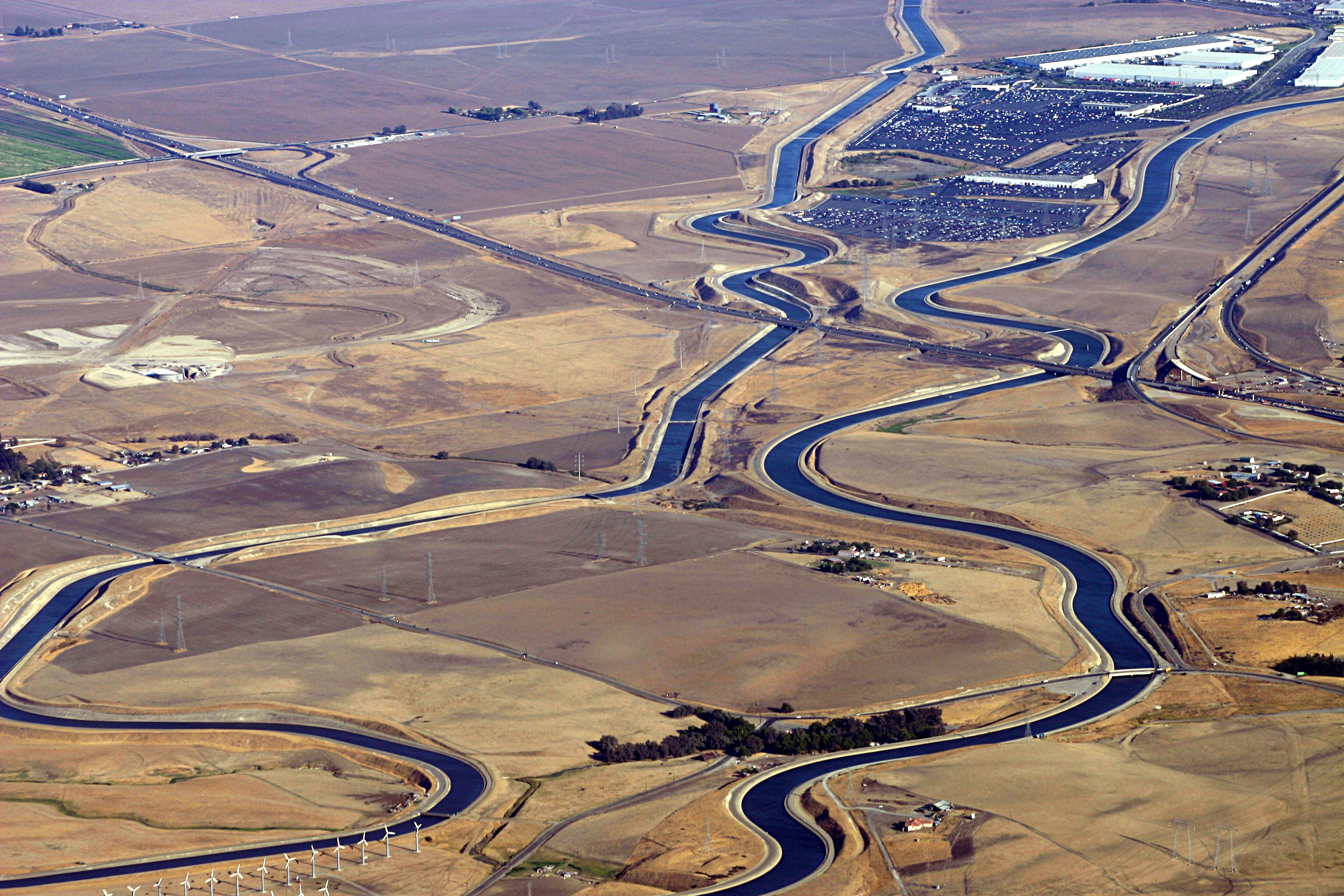
- The Delta–Mendota Canal (left) and the California Aqueduct (right) near Tracy, California
- Coordinates: 37°49′47″N 121°33′25″W
- Begins: Clifton Court Forebay, Contra Costa County; 37°49′47″N 121°33′25″W
- Ends: West Branch; Castaic Lake, Los Angeles County; 34°35′15″N 118°39′25″W; East Branch; Silverwood Lake, San Bernardino County; 34°18′12″N 117°19′12″W; Coastal Branch; Lake Cachuma, Santa Barbara County; 34°35′12″N 119°58′52″W
- Official name: Governor Edmund G. Brown California Aqueduct
- Maintained by: California Department of Water Resources

Characteristics
- Total length: Total: 444 mi (715 km); Main: 304 mi (489 km); East Branch: 140 mi (230 km)
- Width: 110 ft (34 m) max.
- Height: 40 ft (12 m) max.
- Capacity: 13,100 cu ft/s (370 m^{3}/s) max

History
- Construction start: 1963; 63 years ago
- Opened: Coastal Branch Phase 1 - 1968; Coastal Branch Phase 2 - 1997; East Branch - ?; East Branch San Gorgonio Pass extension - 2002; West Branch - ?; Delta–Mendota Canal Intertie - 2012

Location
- Interactive map of California Aqueduct

The Governor Edmund G. Brown California Aqueduct is a system of canals, tunnels, and pipelines that conveys water collected from the Sierra Nevada and valleys of Northern and Central California to Southern California. Named after California Governor Edmund Gerald "Pat" Brown Sr., the over 400-mile (640 km) aqueduct is the principal feature of the California State Water Project.

The aqueduct begins at the Clifton Court Forebay at the southwestern corner of the Sacramento–San Joaquin River Delta. The aqueduct then heads south, eventually splitting into three branches: the Coastal Branch, ending at Lake Cachuma in Santa Barbara County; the West Branch, conveying water to Castaic Lake in Los Angeles County; and the East Branch, connecting Silverwood Lake in San Bernardino County.

The Department of Water Resources (DWR) operates and maintains the California Aqueduct, including one pumped-storage hydroelectric plant, Gianelli Power Plant. Gianelli is located at the base of San Luis Dam, which forms San Luis Reservoir, the largest offstream reservoir in the United States.

The Castaic Power Plant, while similar and which is owned and operated by the Los Angeles Department of Water and Power, is located on the northern end of Castaic Lake, while Castaic Dam is located at the southern end.

Land subsidence has occurred along the aqueduct and has had a steady increase since its relatively stable state post construction of the aqueduct.

== The aqueduct system ==
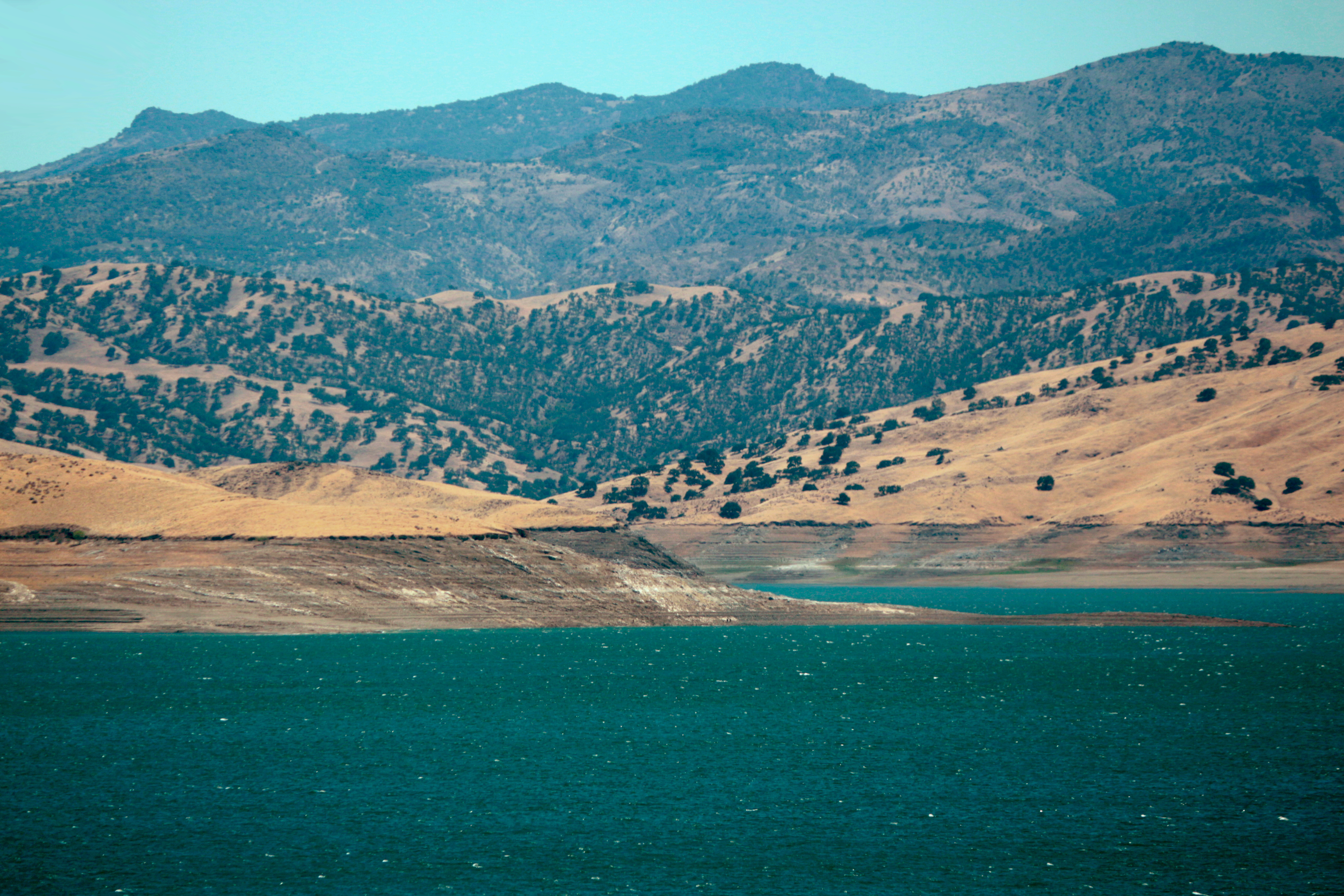
San Luis Reservoir in July 2021

The aqueduct serves 35 million people and 5.7 million acres of farmland, and begins at the San Joaquin-Sacramento River Delta at the Banks Pumping Plant, which pumps from the Clifton Court Forebay. Water is pumped by the Banks Pumping Plant to the Bethany Reservoir. The reservoir serves as a forebay for the South Bay Aqueduct via the South Bay Pumping Plant. From the Bethany Reservoir, the aqueduct flows by gravity approximately 60 mi (97 km) to the O'Neill Forebay at the San Luis Reservoir. From the O'Neill Forebay, it flows approximately 16 mi (26 km) to the Dos Amigos Pumping Plant. After Dos Amigos, the aqueduct flows about 95 mi (153 km) to where the Coastal Branch splits from the "main line". The split is approximately 16 mi (26 km) south-southeast of Kettleman City. After the coastal branch, the line continues by gravity another 66 mi (106 km) to the Buena Vista Pumping Plant. From the Buena Vista, it flows approximately 27 mi (43 km) to the Teerink Pumping Plant. After Teerink it flows about 2.5 mi (4.0 km) to the Chrisman Pumping Plant. Chrisman is the last pumping plant before Edmonston Pumping Plant, which is 13 mi (21 km) from Chrisman. South of the plant the west branch splits off in a southwesterly direction to serve the Los Angeles Basin. At Edmonston Pumping Plant it is pumped 1,926 ft (587 m) over the Tehachapi Mountains.

Water flows through the aqueduct in a series of abrupt rises and gradual falls. The water flows down a long segment, built at a slight grade, and arrives at a pumping station powered by Path 66 or Path 15. The pumping station raises the water, where it again gradually flows downhill to the next station. However, where there are substantial drops, the water's potential energy is recaptured by hydroelectric plants. The initial pumping station fed by the Sacramento River Delta raises the water 240 ft (73 m), while a series of pumps culminating at the Edmonston Pumping Plant raises the water 1,926 ft (587 m) over the Tehachapi Mountains.

A typical section has a concrete-lined channel 40 feet (12 m) at the base and an average water depth of about 30 ft (9.1 m). The widest section of the aqueduct is 110 feet (34 m) and the deepest is 32 feet (9.8 m). Channel capacity is 13,100 cubic feet per second (370 m^{3}/s) and the largest pumping plant capacity at Dos Amigos is 15,450 cubic feet per second (437 m^{3}/s).

A 2021 study published in Nature Sustainability estimated that the installation of solar panels over the canal could potentially reduce annual water evaporation by 11–22 million US gallons per mile (27,000,000–51,000,000 L/km) of canal. While electricity generated by the solar panels could be used by the aqueduct's pumping systems, the study also considered the possibility of supplying power to irrigation systems in the Central Valley to reduce reliance on diesel-powered irrigation pumps. Similar canal-spanning solar installations have been demonstrated in India, including a steel truss design in Gujarat and a suspension cable design in Punjab.

== Branches ==
From its beginning until its first branch, the aqueduct passes through parts of Contra Costa, Alameda, San Joaquin, Stanislaus, Merced, Fresno, and Kings counties. The aqueduct then divides into three branches: the Coastal Branch in the Central Valley, and the East and West Branches after passing over the Tehachapi Mountains.

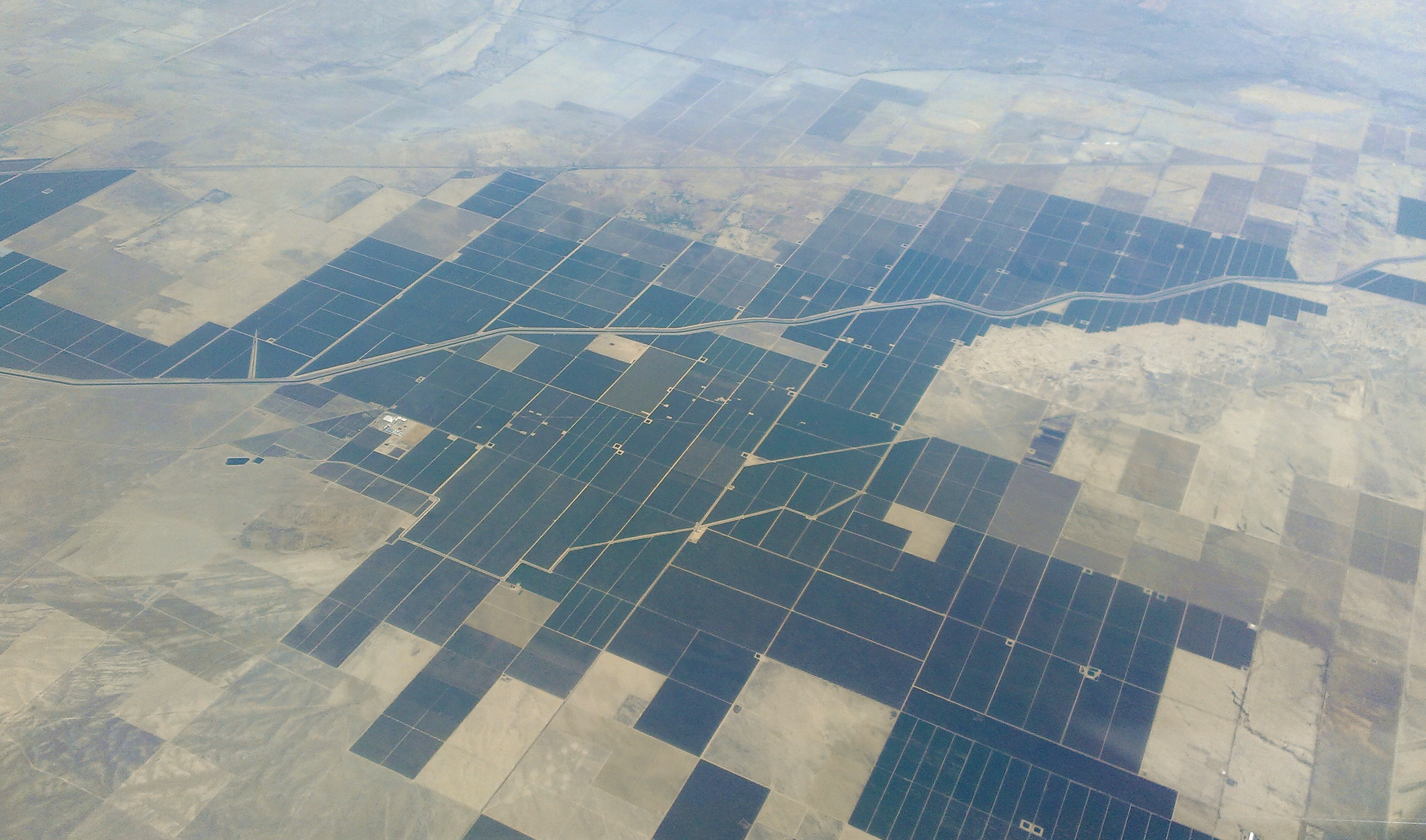
Aqueduct and surrounding farms in Kern County

=== Coastal Branch ===
The Coastal Branch splits from the main line 11.3 mi (18.2 km) south-southeast of Kettleman City transiting Kings County, Kern County, San Luis Obispo County, and Santa Barbara County to deliver water to the coastal cities of San Luis Obispo, Santa Maria, and Santa Barbara. The Coastal Branch is 116 mi (187 km) and has five pump stations. Phase I, an above-ground aqueduct totaling 15 mi (24 km) from where it branches from the California Aqueduct, was completed in 1968. With construction beginning in 1994, Phase II consists of 101 mi (163 km) of a 42–57-inch (1.07–1.45 m) diameter buried pipeline extending from the Devils Den Pump Plant, and terminates at Tank 5 on Vandenberg Space Force Base in Santa Barbara County. The Central Coast Water Authority (CCWA) extension, completed in 1997, is a (30–39 in) (76–99 cm) diameter pipeline that travels 42 mi (68 km) from Vandenberg through Vandenberg Village, Lompoc, Buellton, and Solvang where it terminates at Lake Cachuma in Los Padres National Forest.

Coastal Branch facilities include:

- Las Perillas Pumping Plant
- Badger Hill Pumping Plant
- Devil's Den Pumping Plant
- Bluestone Pumping Plant
- Polonio Pass Pumping Plant
- Polonio Pass Water Treatment Plant
- Cuesta Tunnel
- Santa Ynez Pumping Facility

=== East Branch ===
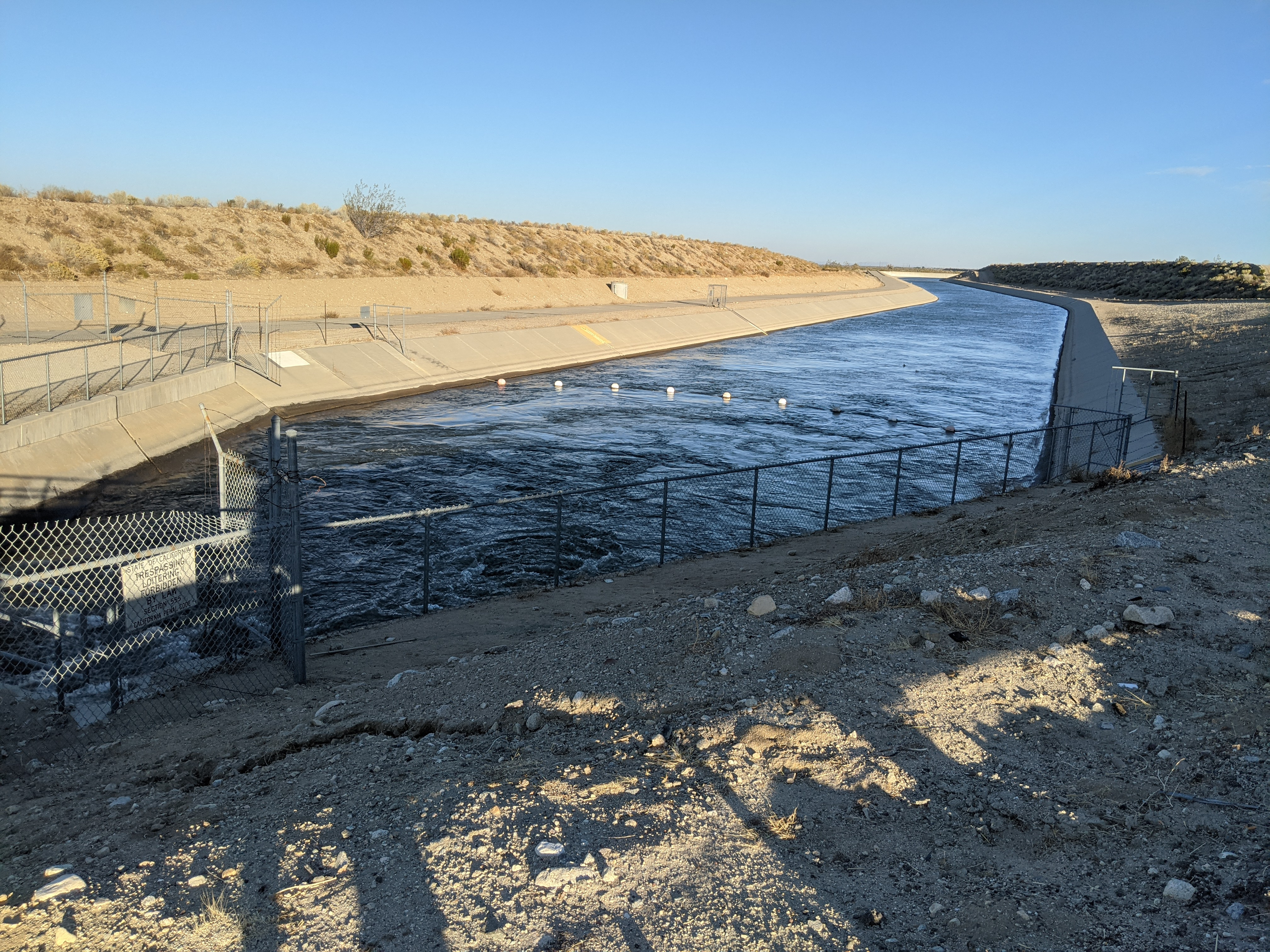
The California Aqueduct East Branch, flowing east after crossing under state route 138

The aqueduct splits off into the East Branch and West Branch in extreme southern Kern County, north of the Los Angeles County line. The East Branch supplies Lake Palmdale and terminates at Lake Perris, in the area of the San Gorgonio Pass. It passes through parts of Kern, Los Angeles, San Bernardino, and Riverside counties.

East Branch facilities include:

- Tehachapi East Afterbay
- Alamo Power Plant
- Pearblossom Pumping Plant
- Mojave Siphon
- Mojave Siphon Power Plant
- Cedar Springs Dam
- Silverwood Lake
- San Bernardino Intake Structure
- San Bernardino Tunnel
- Devil Canyon Power Plant
- Devil Canyon Afterbay 1 and Afterbay 2
- Greenspot Pump Station (Backup)
- Citrus Reservoir
- Citrus Pump Station
- Crafton Hills Reservoir
- Crafton Hills Pump Station
- Cherry Valley Pump Station
- Perris Lake and Dam

=== West Branch ===
The West Branch continues to head towards its terminus at Pyramid Lake and Castaic Lake in the Angeles National Forest to supply the western Los Angeles basin. It passes through parts of Kern and Los Angeles counties.

West Branch facilities include

- Oso Pumping Plant
- Peace Valley Pipeline
- Warne Powerplant
- Angeles Tunnel
- Castaic Power Plant

=== Bikeway ===
California Aqueduct Bikeway near Patterson

The California Aqueduct Bikeway is open from Bethany Reservoir State Recreation Area outside Tracy to the O'Neil Forebay outside Los Banos. The total length of this segment is about 65 miles. The Bikeway itself is well maintained (typically gravel over asphalt), however, some of the access gates are either broken, missing, or bent to the point that you will need to lift your bike over gates in places. Additionally, signage is completely absent in many places and this can be confusing when the Bikeway diverges from the Aqueduct. If biking these segments proceed with caution as it can be very hot, there is limited water availability, and the Aqueduct itself is very dangerous.

An additional segment in Los Angeles was open but is currently closed. When it was open, the California Aqueduct Bikeway was the longest of the paved paths in the Los Angeles area, at 107 miles (172 km) long from Quail Lake near Gorman in the Sierra Pelona Mountains through the desert to Silverwood Lake in the San Bernardino Mountains. This path was closed in 1988 due to bicyclist safety and liability issues. It is expected to remain closed indefinitely due to the continued liability issues and an increased focus on security, especially after the September 11, 2001 attacks.

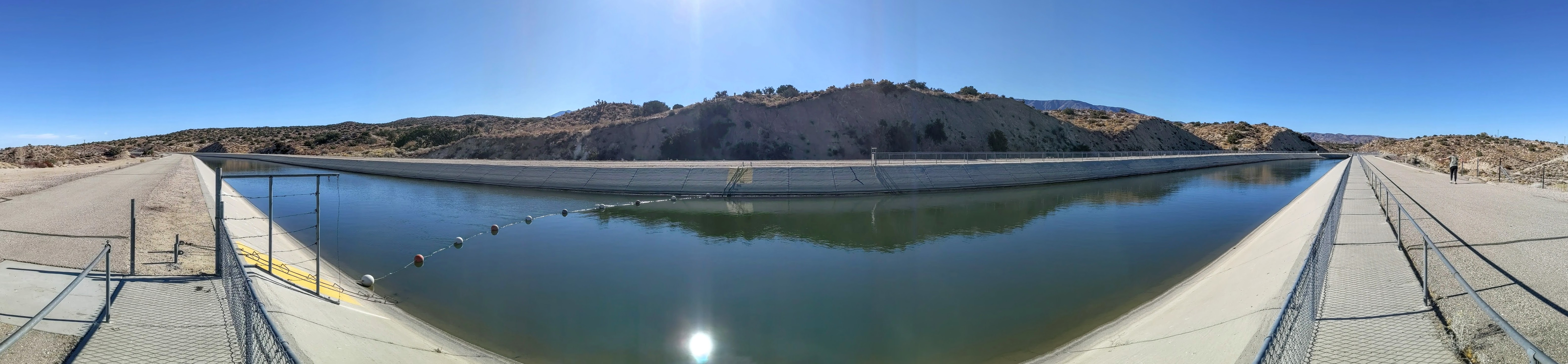
Fishing spot and closed bikeway near Pearblossom, panoramic view

=== Pumping stations ===
Phase I, canal

- Las Perillas Pumping Plant 35°50′35″N 119°54′33″W, Kings County
- Badger Hill Pumping Plant 35°50′05″N 119°56′34″W, Kings County

Phase II, pipeline and tunnel

- Devil's Den Pumping Plant 35°42′43″N 120°00′39″W, Kern County
- Bluestone Pumping Plant 35°42′29″N 120°05′04″W, Kern County
- Polonio Pass Pumping Plant 35°43′52″N 120°12′28″W, San Luis Obispo County

== Hydrography ==
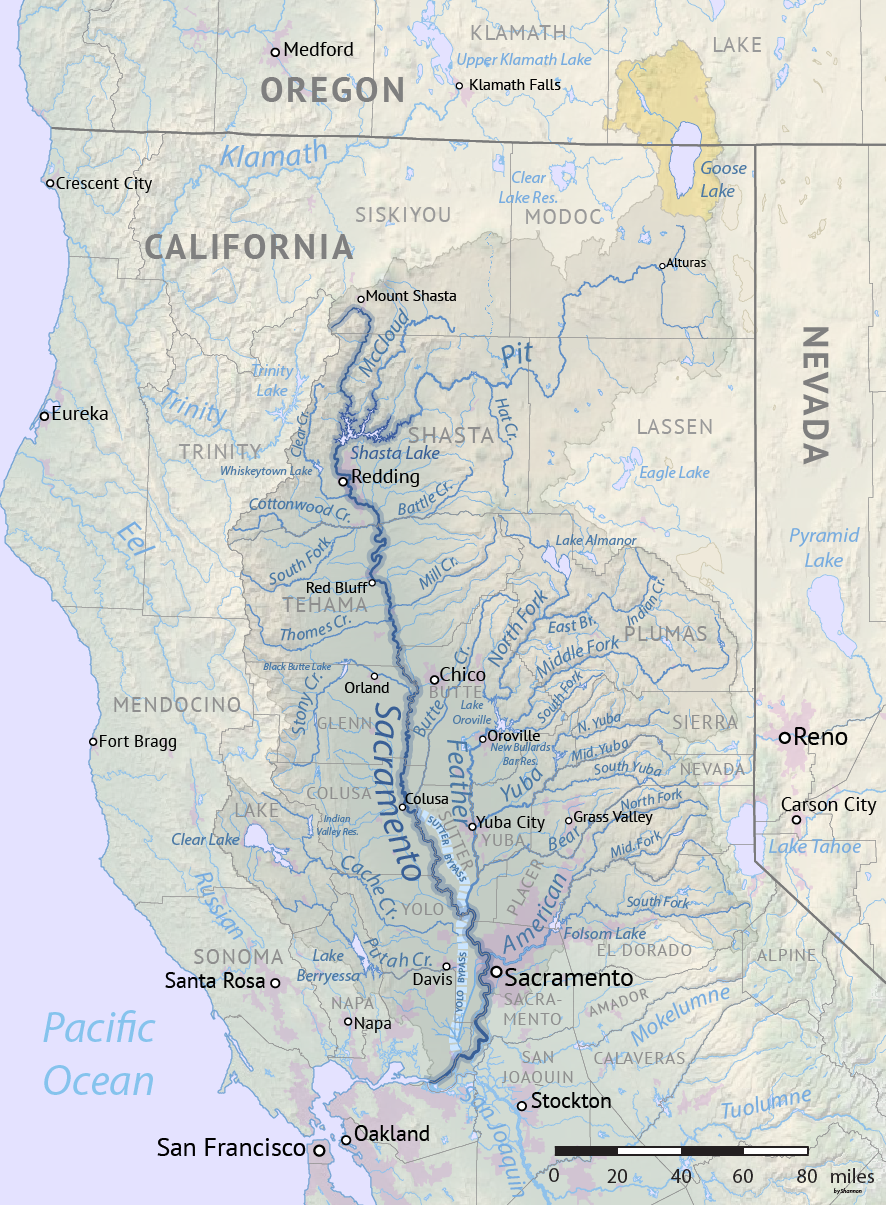
Sacramento River watershed

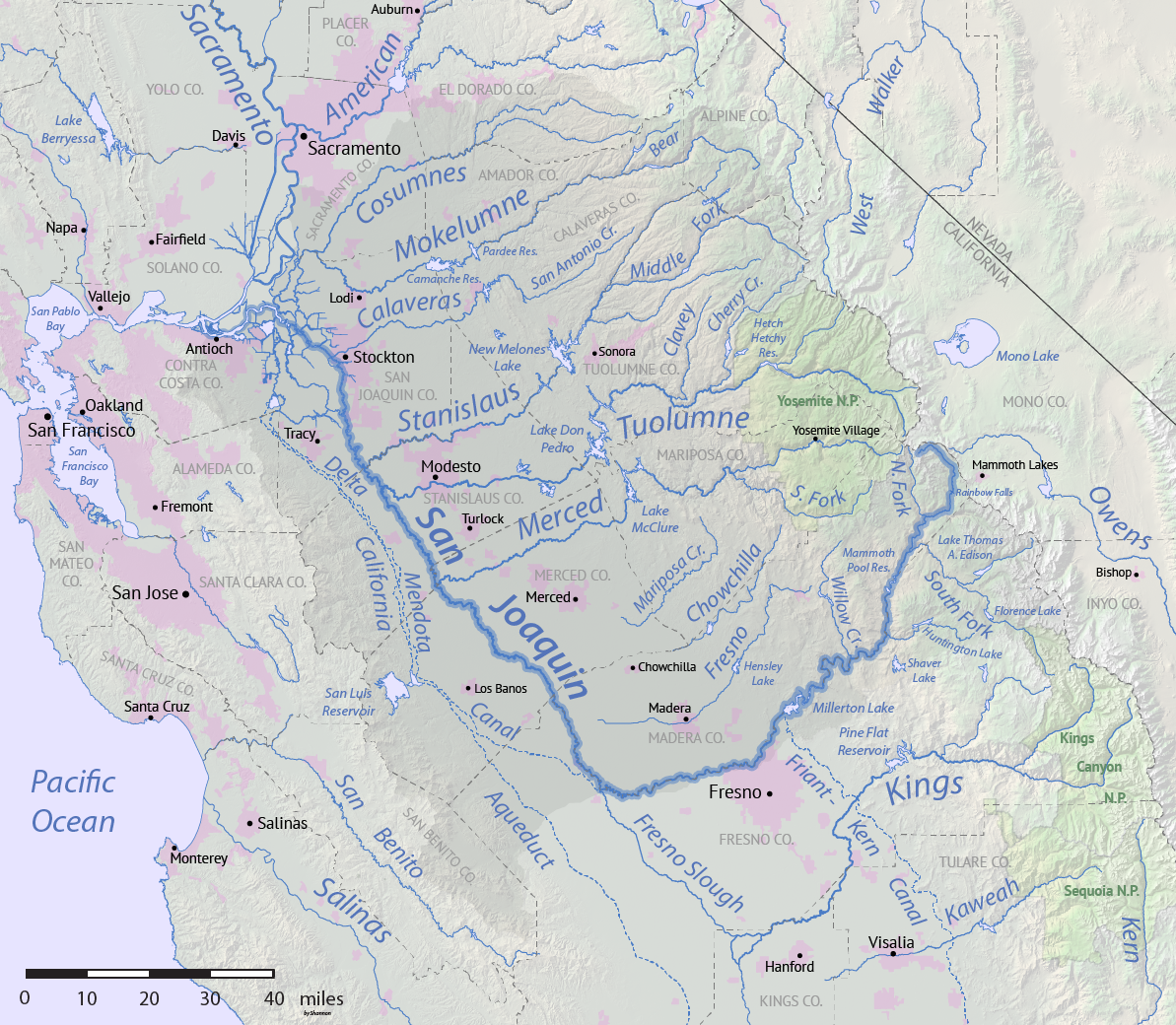
San Joaquin River watershed and Tulare Basin

Two major river systems drain and define the two parts of the Central Valley. Their impact on the California Aqueduct is both direct and indirect. The Sacramento River, along with its tributaries the Feather River and American River, flows southwards through the Sacramento Valley for about 447 miles (719 km). In the San Joaquin Valley, the San Joaquin River flows roughly northwest for 365 miles (587 km), picking up tributaries such as the Merced River, Tuolumne River, Stanislaus River and Mokelumne River.

In the south part of the San Joaquin Valley, the alluvial fan of the Kings River and another one from Coast Ranges streams have created a divide and resultantly the currently dry Tulare basin of the Central Valley, into which flow four major Sierra Nevada rivers, the Kings, Kaweah, Tule and Kern. This basin, usually endorheic, formerly filled during heavy snowmelt and spilled out into the San Joaquin River. Called Tulare Lake, it is usually dry nowadays because the rivers feeding it have been diverted for agricultural purposes.

The rivers of the Central Valley converge in the Sacramento-San Joaquin Delta, a complex network of marshy channels, distributaries and sloughs that wind around islands mainly used for agriculture. Here the freshwater of the rivers merges with tidewater, and eventually reach the Pacific Ocean after passing through Suisun Bay, San Pablo Bay, upper San Francisco Bay and finally the Golden Gate. Many of the islands now lie below sea level because of intensive agriculture, and have a high risk of flooding, which would cause salt water to rush back into the delta, especially when there is too little fresh water flowing in from the Valley.

The Sacramento River carries far more water than the San Joaquin, with an estimated 22 million acre-feet (27 km^{3}) of virgin annual runoff, as compared to the San Joaquin's approximately 6 million acre-feet (7.4 km^{3}). Intensive agricultural and municipal water consumption has reduced the present rate of outflow to about 17 million acre-feet (21 km^{3}) for the Sacramento and 3 million acre-feet (3.7 km^{3}) for the San Joaquin; however, these figures still vary widely from year to year. Over 25 million people, living both in the valley and in other regions of the state, rely on the water carried by these rivers.

== Land subsidence ==
=== Background ===
Land subsidence is when the land gradually or suddenly sinks or settles due to movement or removal of natural materials such as water, minerals, oil and natural gases. More often than not, subsidence occurs when large quantities of groundwater are removed from sediment or rocks. As groundwater is drawn from deep underground layers of clay, the clay compresses, causing subsidence. In cases of groundwater removal, disruption to land on the surface and underground water storage can either be elastic, meaning recoverable, or inelastic, meaning permanent. Coarse-grained sediment which holds groundwater can be drained and recharged with minimal underground and surface level damage and the change that does occur is considered seasonal subsidence. However, fine-grained sediment takes longer to draw water out of and recharge and if groundwater levels are left low for too long, the compaction of the sediment is permanent and causes irreversible land subsidence. This often occurs due to human interference, but can also happen from natural phenomena. Subsidence can happen over very large areas or small little sections of land. This has occurred along the California Aqueduct of the State Water Project since construction.

Human causes include; pumping, mining and fracking.

Natural causes include; earthquakes, erosion, glacial movement, soil compaction and the formation of sinkholes.

Groundwater use and pumping in the area was the major water use for farmers and agriculture in the 1920s, and over time, this over-pumping resulted in land subsidence and a decline in groundwater-level resources. In time, this resulted in major land subsidence by the 1970s with local areas having 0.30 to 8.5 m (1 to 28 ft) of subsidence. With the creation and use of the California Aqueduct along these regions, surface water being transported put a halt on significant compaction and a recovery in ground water levels now with less ground water pumping. The aqueduct has been increasing in subsidence rates rapidly, even though it was relatively stable for many years after being constructed. The Tulare Basin is subsiding at a rate of about 30 cm (one foot) per year, as measured by NASA's GRACE satellite. The Central Valley, where a large portion of the California Aqueduct runs through, has been affected by the pumping of groundwater and subsequent land subsidence. Farmers in and near the Central Valley have become reliant on groundwater especially with recent droughts impacting the amount of readily accessible surface water. However, overuse of groundwater can cause irreversible damage. During the 2011-2017 California drought, a record high drought, groundwater and its storage capabilities in the San Joaquin Valley saw a sharp decline. From October 2011 to September 2015 measurements made on groundwater levels in the San Joaquin Valley's aquifers recorded a loss of 14 km^{3}/year, a total of 56 km^{3}. During this same period up to 1,000 mm of land subsidence was measured in the San Joaquin Valley. Concerns around groundwater depletion have contributed to legislation to reduce the demand for groundwater and incentivize farmers to use sustainable irrigation practices.

=== Measurement ===
Measurement of this subsidence is done in a few ways. Originally, subsidence was recorded based on land surveying, repeating the surveying, and along with monitoring compaction by recording the data from extensometers at multiple sites. Since then, Global Positioning Systems (GPS) has been used along with land surveying to record subsidence and compaction. More recently, interferometric synthetic aperture radar (InSAR) has been used to monitor subsidence along with GPS. InSAR is being used to recreate maps to closely watch the progression of the land around the aqueduct.

=== Consequences ===
Subsidence can put land, both private and public, at risk of infrastructure damage. Bridges, levees, roads, and groundwater wells are either at risk of damage or have been damaged already. With subsidence progression, underground aquifers could be at risk and water storage from them could be threatened. Damage and sinking of the canal of the aqueduct has already occurred from subsidence which has made the canal less reliable. Capacity has been compromised due to damage to the canals and therefore has caused problems and delays with delivering the water across the state, as well as higher rates and costs for power and operation.

== In popular culture ==
A documentary about the decline of the United States' infrastructure, The Crumbling of America, was commissioned by the U.S. A&E network in the late 2000s. The documentary is typically shown on the History television channel in the United States, although other educational broadcasters globally have shown it. It features the Clifton Court Forebay (a primary intake point for California Aqueduct) as a "strategic piece of California freshwater infrastructure" subject to shutdown for up to two years if struck by an earthquake of magnitude 7.5 or greater.

The aqueduct is featured in an episode of California's Gold with Huell Howser.

== See also ==
- Colorado River Aqueduct
- Los Angeles Aqueduct
