= Los Banos =

Los Banos can refer to

- Los Banos, California, a city in the San Joaquin Valley of California.
- Los Baños, Laguna, a city in the Philippines.
