= South Bay Aqueduct =

In California, U.S.

The South Bay Aqueduct is an aqueduct located in the eastern part of the San Francisco Bay Area. It conveys water from the Sacramento-San Joaquin Delta through over forty miles of pipelines and canals. It begins in north-eastern Alameda County on the California Aqueduct's Bethany Reservoir serving as the forebay. The aqueduct flows along the eastern and southern edges of the Livermore Valley. Then it flows through a series of tunnels to an end in the foothills of eastern San Jose, 5 miles (8 km) from downtown San Jose, California.

Construction on the South Bay Aqueduct began in 1960. The Aqueduct was the first delivery system completed under the State Water Project and has been conveying water to Alameda County since 1962 and to Santa Clara County since 1965. The South Bay Aqueduct begins at Bethany Reservoir near Tracy, with the South Bay Pumping Plant lifting water 566 feet into the first reach of the Aqueduct. The South Bay's Pumping Plant's nine pumping units, with a combined capacity of 330 cubic feet per second, discharge water through two parallel buried pipelines to the eastern ridge of the Diablo Range.

From there, water flows by gravity for nine miles to the 100 acre-foot Patterson Reservoir, where some water is released for delivery to Livermore Valley. Water flow then continues about nine miles to a junction point where a portion is diverted into a 1 1/2-mile branch line and pumped into Lake Del Valle.

Beyond the Del Valle junction, the water flows by pipeline to La Costa Tunnel, proceeds southwest past Sunol, through the Mission Tunnel, then south through the hills overlooking San Francisco Bay. The South Bay Aqueduct terminates inside a 160-foot diameter steel tank at the Santa Clara Valley Water District’s Penitencia Water Treatment Plant, located approximately five miles east of downtown San Jose.

== Water agencies served ==
- Alameda County Flood Control and Water Conservation District (Zone 7) - Maximum Annual Entitlement: 46,000 acre-feet (57,000,000 m^{3})
- Alameda County Water District - Maximum Annual Entitlement: 42,000 acre-feet (52,000,000 m^{3})
- Santa Clara Valley Water District - Maximum Annual Entitlement: 100,000 acre-feet (120,000,000 m^{3})

== Reservoirs ==
- Bethany Reservoir
- Lake Del Valle
