= Klamath Diversion =

The planned reservoir on the Klamath river

The Klamath Diversion was a federal water project proposed by the U.S. Bureau of Reclamation in the 1950s. It would have diverted the Klamath River in Northern California to the more arid central and southern parts of that state. It would relieve irrigation water demand and groundwater overdraft in the Central Valley and boost the water supply for Southern California. Through the latter it would allow for other Southwestern states—Arizona, Nevada, New Mexico and Utah—as well as Mexico to receive an increased share of the waters of the Colorado River.

Although many different versions of the plan were put forth, all would have involved damming the Klamath River, as well as the Trinity River and several other tributaries. A tunnel would have carried much of the Klamath's water to the Sacramento River, whose flow would be routed around the Sacramento-San Joaquin Delta and travel under the Tehachapi Mountains to the Los Angeles Basin. However, the Klamath River has one of the western continental United States' most significant salmon runs, and building the diversion would have all but destroyed this productive fishery. Both commercial fishermen and Native Americans—namely the Yurok—opposed the plan, as did the city of Los Angeles. The city saw the Klamath Diversion as a "ploy to encourage it to relinquish its claim on the share of the river [the Colorado] it considered its own".

== Background ==
The rapid development of the American Southwest in the late 19th and early 20th centuries coincided with a wet period that swelled the flow of rivers, allowing for much more water consumption than was sustainable under normal, long-term conditions. The Colorado River, the main water supply of the Desert Southwest, averaged 17 million acre-feet (21 km^{3}) of annual runoff from pre-1920s gaged records. At that time, there was ample amount for all the Southwest states and Mexico. When the region spun out of its wet spell, the Colorado was found to have a maximum sustainable runoff of perhaps 14.5 to 16 million acre-feet (17.9 to 19.7 km^{3}) per year. This great reduction in water supply spurred Southern California to look north to the Sacramento–San Joaquin river system for water. However, most of the water in these rivers was already appropriated for irrigation.

The only remaining large, undammed river systems in California were those in the wild North Coast region, which drain to the Pacific Ocean nearly unused by agriculture or cities. The Klamath is the largest of these rivers, discharging more than 12 million acre-feet (15 km^{3}) annually. Not counting smaller rivers in Oregon such as the Rogue and Umpqua, the closest rivers that provide a similar or greater flow are the Columbia River in the north and its tributary the Snake. The Klamath River was not only closer, but has over twice the flow of either the Rogue or Umpqua, and over one-third of the discharge of the Snake. At the time, diverting the Klamath into the Sacramento River system, in turn augmenting its flow for use in Central and Southern California, was an attractive idea. The first plans to divert the Klamath appeared in a 1951 Bureau of Reclamation report called the United Western Investigation: Interim Report on Reconnaissance.

The major physical barrier towards development of the Klamath River is the climate of its watershed. The Klamath River begins in the high desert of southern Oregon, and the average annual flow at Keno (about 20 miles below Upper Klamath Lake) is just over 1.1 million acre-feet (1.4 km^{3}). A Klamath Diversion at this point would be simple–an aqueduct running south to Shasta Lake on the Sacramento River—but the flow here is not enough to warrant such an effort. The river gains most of its volume in high rainfall regions as it approaches the coast, but here it is walled off from the Sacramento River system by the Klamath Mountains. Any diversion from the lower Klamath would require one of the most massive engineering projects ever undertaken.

== Proposals and controversy ==
Due to the heavy controversy, the initial Bureau of Reclamation proposal for the project was defeated, but the project continued to resurface throughout the 1960s and 1970s in several different forms. In 1965 Congress passed a bill requiring the Bureau of Reclamation to seek congressional approval before conducting feasibility studies for water projects. This placed such a handicap on the development of new projects that it may have been responsible for killing the Klamath Diversion in its entirety.

The original plan consisted of one large reservoir on the main Klamath, located about 12 miles (19 km) above the mouth of the Klamath at the Pacific Ocean. The Ah Pah Reservoir would be formed by the 813-foot-high (248 m) Ah Pah Dam. This 15-million-acre-foot (19 km^{3}) reservoir would extend 70 miles (110 km) up the Klamath River, with a 40-mile-long (64 km) Trinity River arm that would also flood part of its South Fork. The lower half of the Salmon River and a number of smaller tributaries would also be flooded under the reservoir.

From the Trinity arm, a 60-mile (97 km) tunnel would be drilled under the Klamath Mountains to the Sacramento Valley, through which water would flow by gravity into the Sacramento River. From there it would travel to the San Joaquin Valley and Southern California through the proposed Peripheral Canal (which would bypass the Sacramento–San Joaquin River Delta) and the California Aqueduct.

The Klamath Diversion was also considered as part of the California Water Plan, a statewide effort in the early 1960s to provide more water for the State Water Project, for irrigation in the Central Valley and urban uses in Central and Southern California. The California Water Plan was virtually identical to the Bureau of Reclamation proposal, except on a matter of scale. No fewer than sixteen new dams were proposed, including four on the Klamath River, five on the Trinity River, and others on the Smith, Mad, and Eel River systems. Like the Bureau of Reclamation proposal, this iteration died a victim of its own colossal size.

Ironically, the City of Los Angeles and other entities within Southern California – who would be among the principal beneficiaries – heavily opposed the plan. The prevailing local belief was that the Klamath Diversion was a plot by politicians in the other Colorado River basin states (especially Arizona) to get Southern California to let go of the water it was taking from the Colorado. Combined with concerted opposition from Northern California voters, who saw it as just another water grab by the thirsty south that would damage the ecology, fisheries and natural beauty of the North Coast, the project never left the drawing boards.

== Legacy ==
The scaled-down California Water Plan would become the California State Water Project, drawing its main water supply from the Feather River, a tributary of the Sacramento River.

A diversion from the Klamath basin to the Sacramento was eventually undertaken on a far smaller scale, through the construction of the Trinity River Division of the Central Valley Project, which appropriates about 1.2 million acre-feet (1.5 km^{3}) per year from the Trinity River, a major Klamath River tributary.

Most of the North Coast rivers originally slated for damming have since been granted National Wild and Scenic River status, effectively eliminating the possibility for such a project.

== Works cited ==
- Reisner, Marc (1984). Cadillac Desert. Penguin Books.
