= California State Water Project =

Flood control, energy production, and water conveyance infrastructure in the US

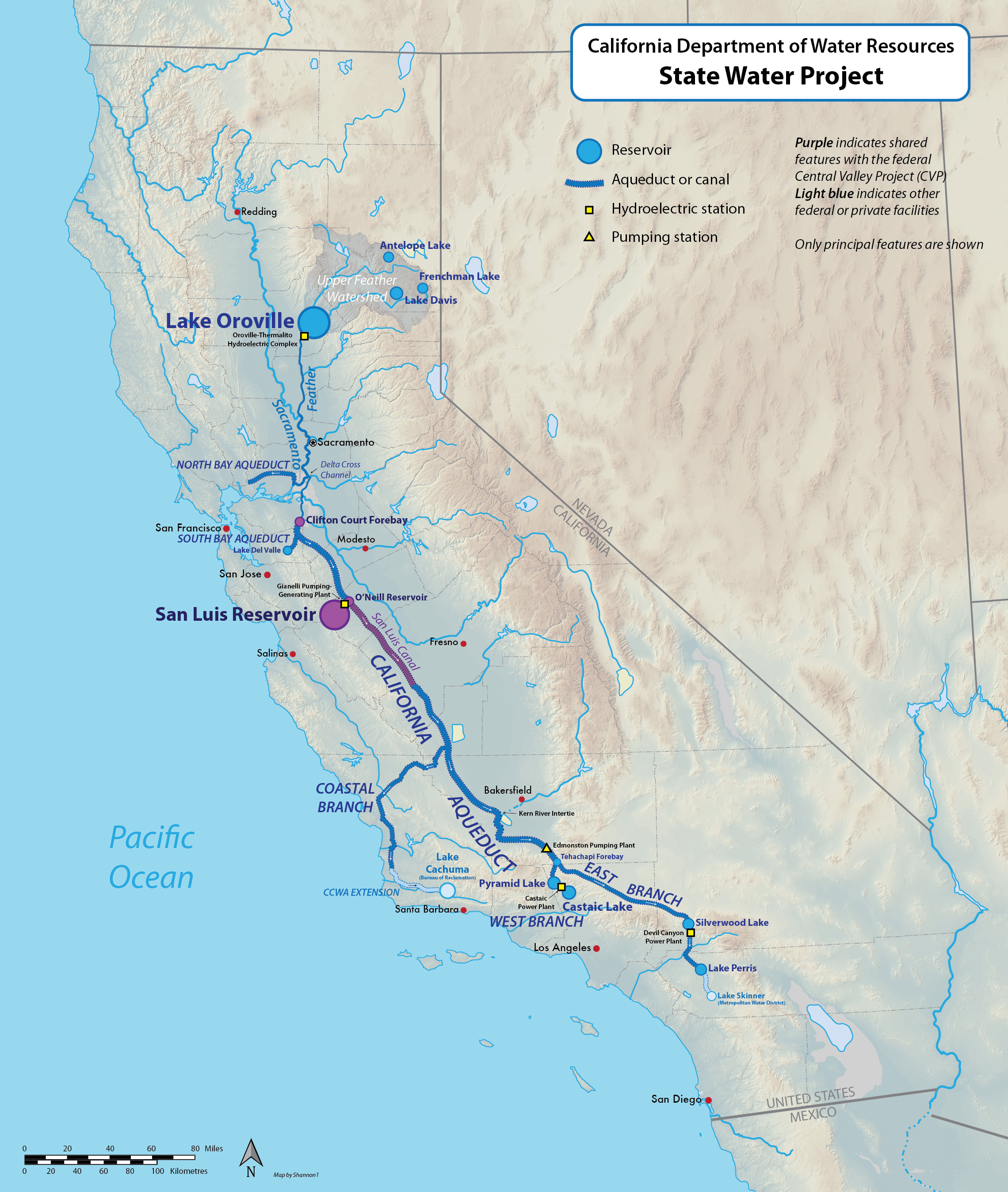
- Map showing major features of the project (SWP reservoirs in blue, SWP/CVP reservoirs in purple, and other connected facilities in light blue)

General statistics
- Begun: 1960
- Storage dams: 10
- Additional dams: 4 (reregulation); 4 (hydroelectric); 2 (flood control); 1 (mitigation/conservation)
- Power plants: 5 conventional 3 pumped-storage
- Canals: 701.5 miles (1,129.0 km)

Operations
- Storage capacity: 5,746,790 acre-feet (7.08856×10^{9} m^{3})
- Annual water yield: 2,400,000 acre-feet (3.0×10^{9} m^{3})
- Land irrigated: 750,000 acres (300,000 ha)
- Power plant capacity: 2,991.7 MW
- Annual generation: 6500 GWh
- Annual consumption: 11500 GWh
- Constituencies served: Greater Los Angeles Area; Greater San Diego; Inland Empire; San Francisco Bay Area; North Bay; Santa Clara Valley; South Bay; Central Coast; San Joaquin Valley

The California State Water Project, commonly known as the SWP, is a state water management project in the U.S. state of California under the supervision of the California Department of Water Resources. The SWP is one of the largest public water and power utilities in the world, providing drinking water for more than 27 million people and generating an average of 6,500 GWh of hydroelectricity annually. It is the largest single consumer of power in the state and has a net usage of 5,100 GWh.

The SWP collects water from rivers in Northern California and redistributes it to the water-scarce but populous cities through a network of aqueducts, pumping stations and power plants. About 70% of the water provided by the project is used for urban areas and industry in Southern California and the San Francisco Bay Area, and 30% is used for irrigation in the Central Valley. To reach Southern California, the water must be pumped 2,882 feet (878 m) over the Tehachapi Mountains, with 1,926 feet (587 m) at the Edmonston Pumping Plant alone, the highest single water lift in the world. The SWP shares many facilities with the federal Central Valley Project (CVP), which primarily serves agricultural users. Water can be interchanged between SWP and CVP canals as needed to meet peak requirements for project constituents. The SWP provides estimated annual benefits of $400 billion to California's economy.

Since its inception in 1960, the SWP has required the construction of 21 dams and more than 700 miles (1,100 km) of canals, pipelines and tunnels, although these constitute only a fraction of the facilities originally proposed. As a result, the project has delivered an average of only 2.4 million acre-feet (3.0 km^{3}) annually, as compared to total entitlements of 4.23 million acre-feet (5.22 km^{3}). Environmental concerns caused by the dry-season removal of water from the Sacramento–San Joaquin River Delta, a sensitive estuary region, have often led to further reductions in water delivery. Work continues today to expand the SWP's water delivery capacity while finding solutions for the environmental impacts of water diversion.

== History ==
The original purpose of the project was to provide water for arid Southern California, whose local water resources and share of the Colorado River were insufficient to sustain the region's growth. The SWP was rooted in two proposals. The United Western Investigation of 1951, a study by the U.S. Bureau of Reclamation, assessed the feasibility of interbasin water transfers in the Western United States. In California, this plan contemplated the construction of dams on rivers draining to California's North Coast – the wild and undammed Klamath, Eel, Mad and Smith River systems – and tunnels to carry the impounded water to the Sacramento River system, where it could be diverted southwards. In the same year, State Engineer A.D. Edmonston proposed the Feather River Project, which proposed the damming of the Feather River, a tributary of the Sacramento River, for the same purpose. The Feather River was much more accessible than the North Coast rivers, but did not have nearly as much water. Under both of the plans, a series of canals and pumps would carry the water south through the Central Valley to the foot of the Tehachapi Mountains, where it would pass through the Tehachapi Tunnel to reach Southern California.

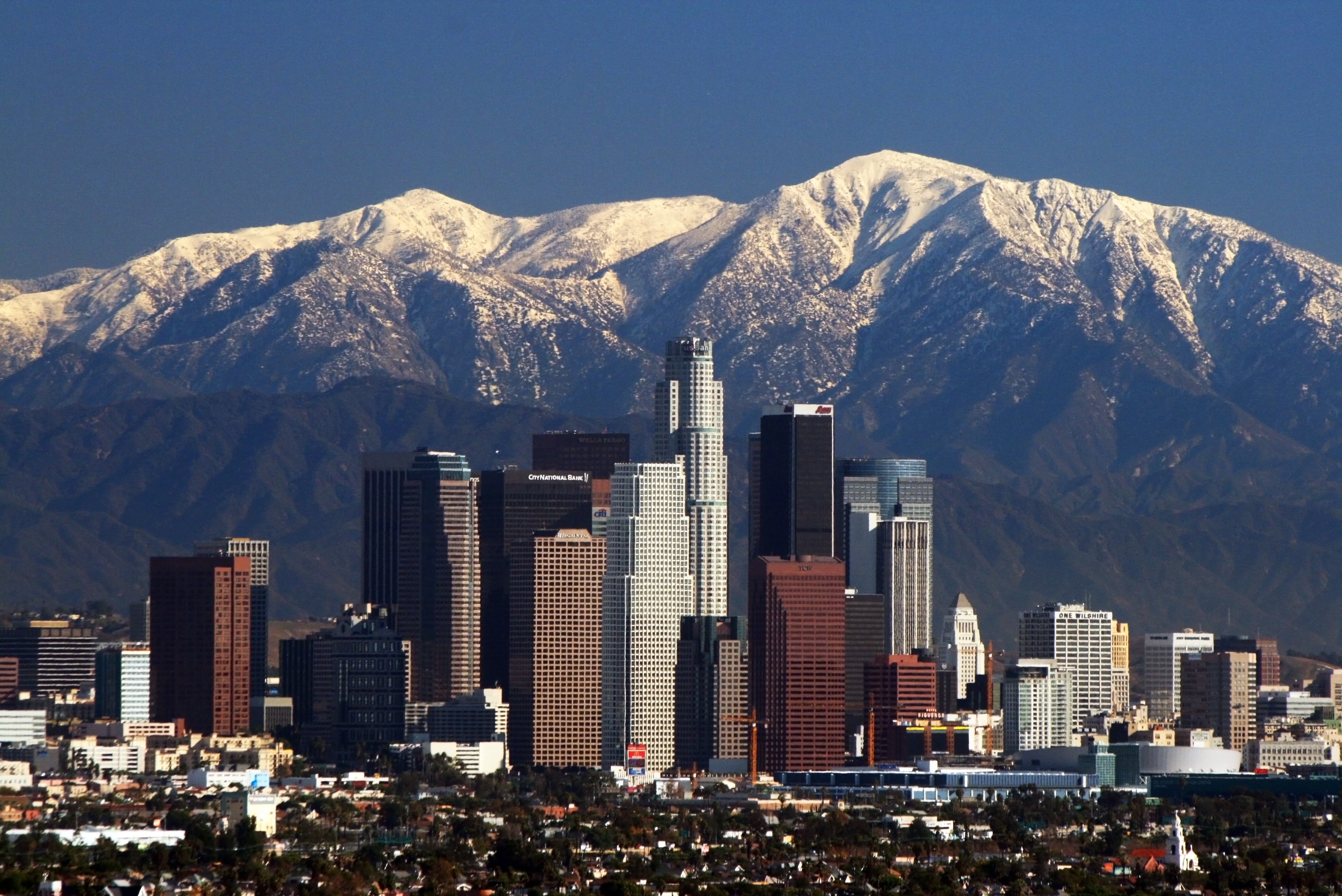
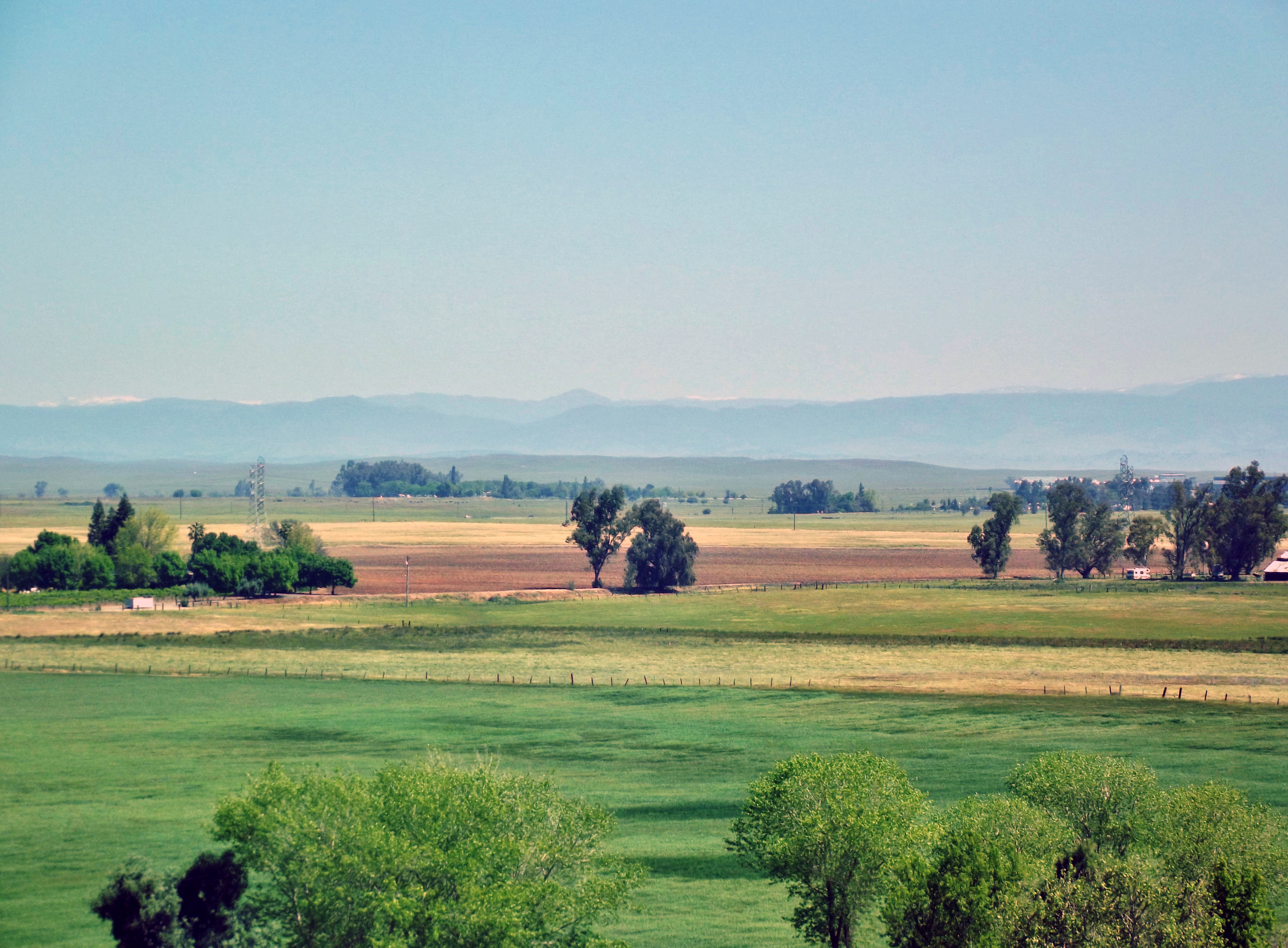
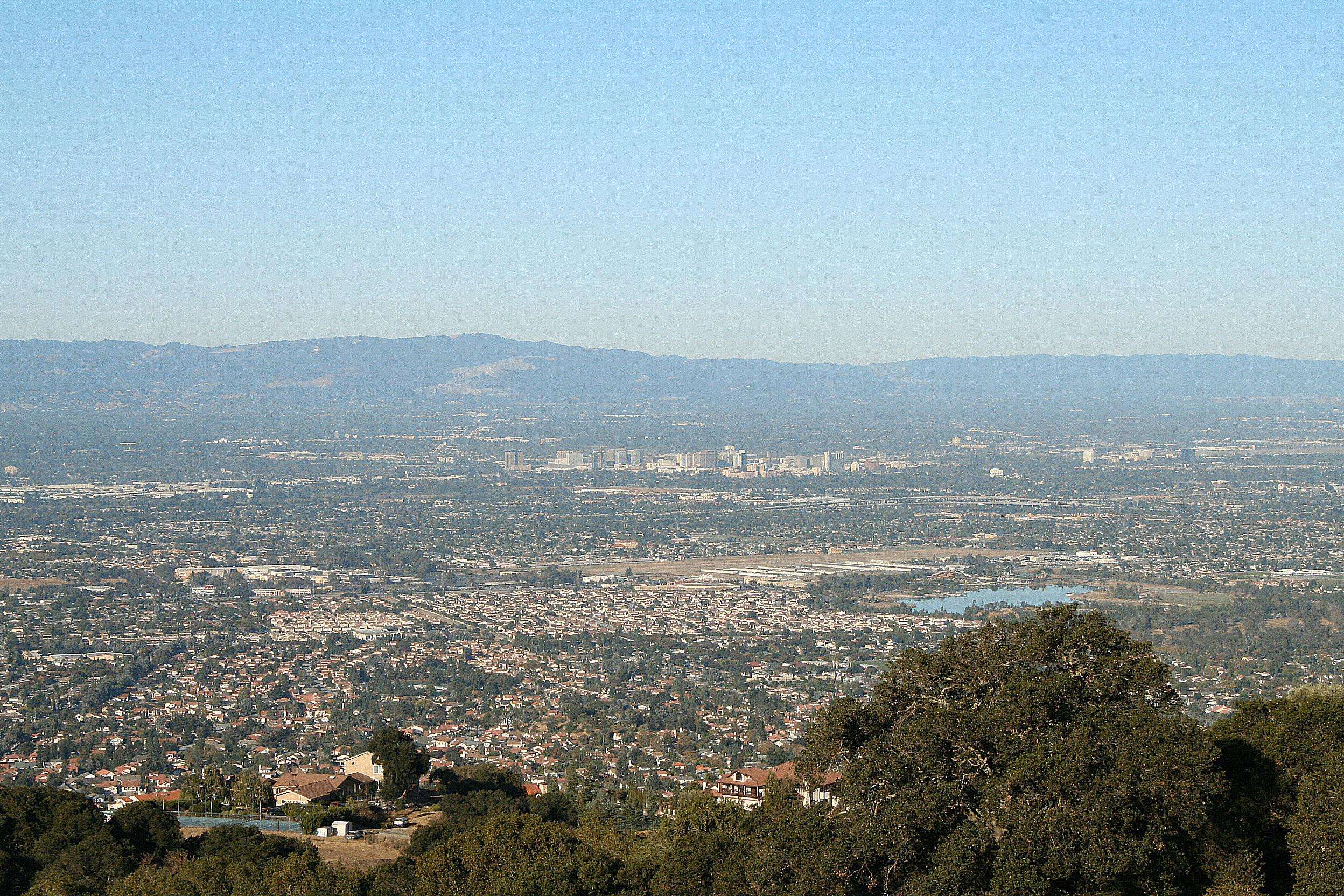
Several primary beneficiaries of the SWP, from left to right: Los Angeles, the San Joaquin Valley, and the Santa Clara Valley (South Bay Area)

Calls for a comprehensive statewide water management system (complementing the extensive, but primarily irrigation-based Central Valley Project) led to the creation of the California Department of Water Resources in 1956. The following year, the preliminary studies were compiled into the extensive California Water Plan, or Bulletin No. 3. The project was intended for "the control, protection, conservation, distribution, and utilization of the waters of California, to meet present and future needs for all beneficial uses and purposes in all areas of the state to the maximum feasible extent." California governor Pat Brown would later say it was to "correct an accident of people and geography".

The diversion of the North Coast rivers was abandoned in the plan's early stages after strong opposition from locals and concerns about the potential impact on the salmon in North Coast rivers. The California Water Plan would have to go ahead with the development of the Feather River alone, as proposed by Edmonston. The Burns-Porter Act of 1959 provided $1.75 billion of initial funding through a bond measure. Construction on Stage I of the project, which would deliver the first 2.23 million acre-feet (2.75 km^{3}) of water, began in 1960. Northern Californians opposed the measure as a boondoggle and an attempt to steal their water resources. In fact, the city of Los Angeles – which was to be one of the principal beneficiaries – also opposed the project; locals saw it as a ploy by politicians in the other Colorado River basin states to get Los Angeles to relinquish its share of the Colorado River. Historians largely attribute the success of the Burns-Porter Act and the State Water Project to major agribusiness lobbying, particularly by J.G. Boswell II of the J.G. Boswell cotton company. The bond was passed on an extremely narrow margin of 174,000 out of 5.8 million ballots cast. In 1966, the Metropolitan Water District passed Proposition W, a Southern California property tax bond to connect its regional water system to the new state project.

In 1961, ground was broken on Oroville Dam, and in 1963, work began on the California Aqueduct and San Luis Reservoir. The first deliveries to the Bay Area were made in 1962, and water reached the San Joaquin Valley by 1968. Due to concerns over the fault-ridden geography of the Tehachapi Mountains, the tunnel plan was scrapped; the water would have to be pumped over the mountains' 3,500-foot (1,100 m) crest. In 1973, the pumps and the East and West branches of the aqueduct were completed, and the first water was delivered to Southern California. A Peripheral Canal, which would have carried SWP water around the vulnerable and ecologically sensitive Sacramento–San Joaquin River Delta, was rejected in 1982 due to environmental concerns. The Coastal Branch, which delivers water to coastal central California, was completed in 1997.

== Project description ==
=== Feather River facilities ===
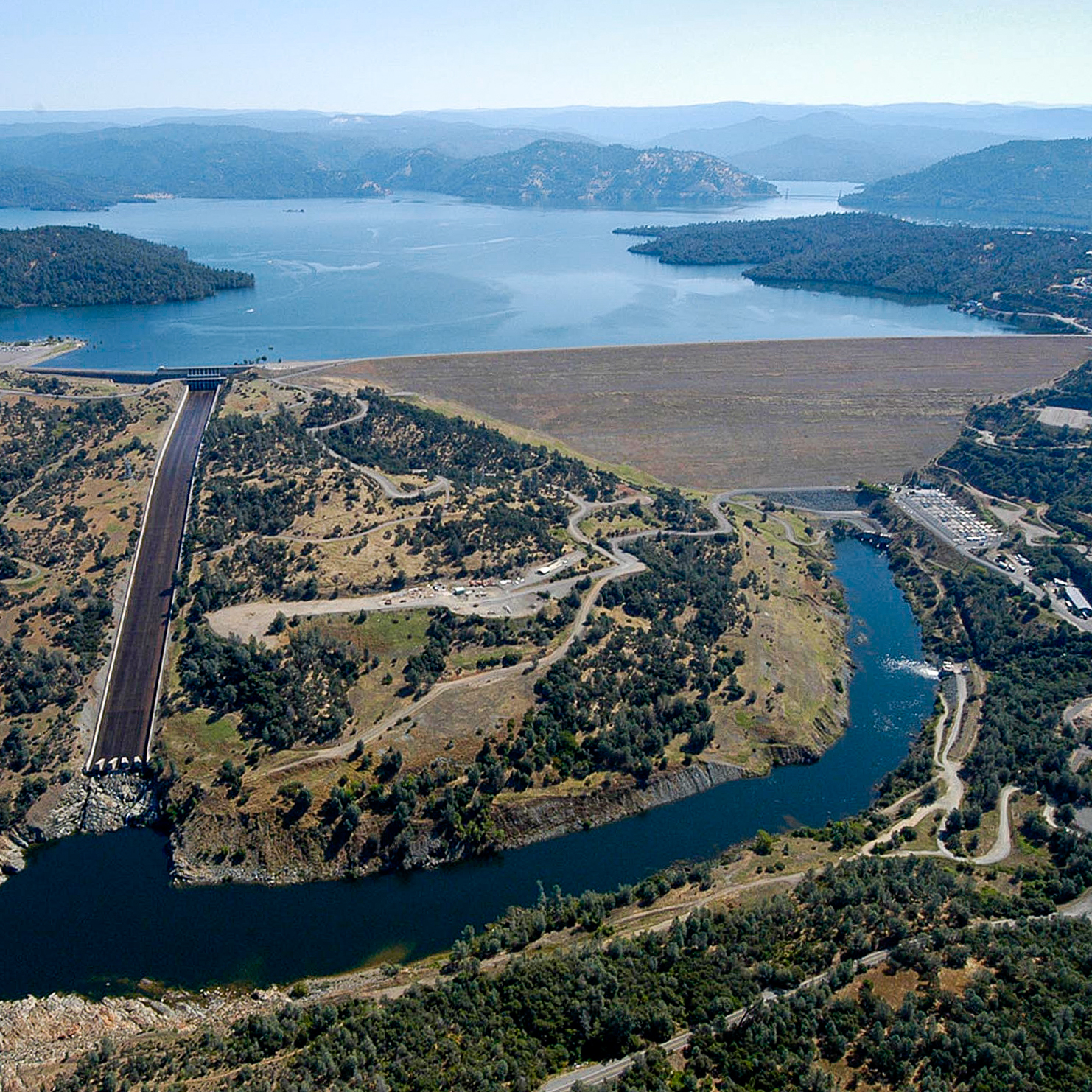
Oroville Dam and Lake Oroville on the Feather River

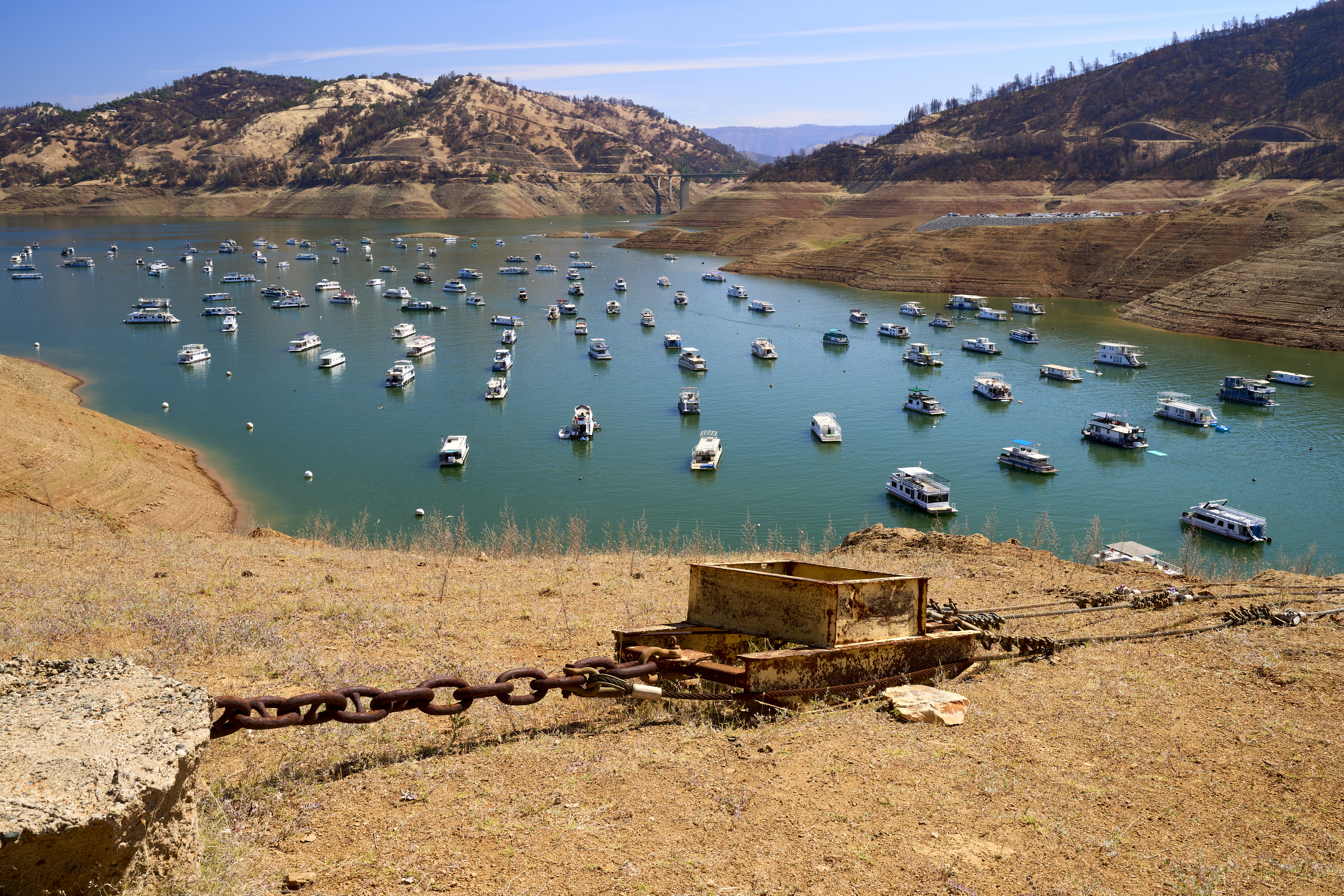
In May 2021, water levels of Lake Oroville dropped significantly, exposing much of the banks as California headed into another drought year. The Edward Hyatt Power Plant was forced to shut down due to low water levels later in the summer.

The Feather River, a tributary of the Sacramento River, provides the primary watershed for the State Water Project. Runoff from the Feather River headwaters is captured in Antelope, Frenchman, and Davis reservoirs, which impound tributaries of the North and Middle forks of the Feather River. Collectively referred to as the Upper Feather River Lakes, these three reservoirs provide a combined storage capacity of about 162,000 acre-feet (0.200 km^{3}).

Water released from the Upper Feather River system flows into Lake Oroville, which is formed by the Oroville Dam several miles above the city of Oroville. At 770 feet (230 m), Oroville is the tallest dam in the United States; by volume it is the largest dam in California. Authorized by an emergency flood control measure in 1957, Oroville Dam was built between 1961 and 1967 with the reservoir filling for the first time in 1968. Lake Oroville has a capacity to store approximately 3.54 million acre-feet (4.37 km^{3}) of water which accounts for 61 percent of the SWP's total system storage capacity, and is the single most important reservoir of the project.

Water stored in Lake Oroville is released through the 819 MW Edward Hyatt pumped-storage powerplant and two other hydroelectric plants downstream of Oroville Dam, which together make up the Oroville–Thermalito Complex. The Thermalito Forebay and Afterbay support the 120 MW Thermalito Pumping-Generating Plant, and the Thermalito Diversion Dam supports a smaller 3.3 MW powerplant. The entire system generates approximately 2.2 billion kilowatt hours per year, making up about a third of the total power generated by SWP facilities.

=== Delta facilities ===
From Oroville, a regulated water flow travels down the Feather and Sacramento Rivers to the Sacramento–San Joaquin River Delta. North of Rio Vista, about 120,000 acre-feet (0.15 km^{3}) per year is pumped into the 27.4-mile (44.1 km) North Bay Aqueduct, completed in 1988. The aqueduct delivers water to clients in Napa and Solano counties.

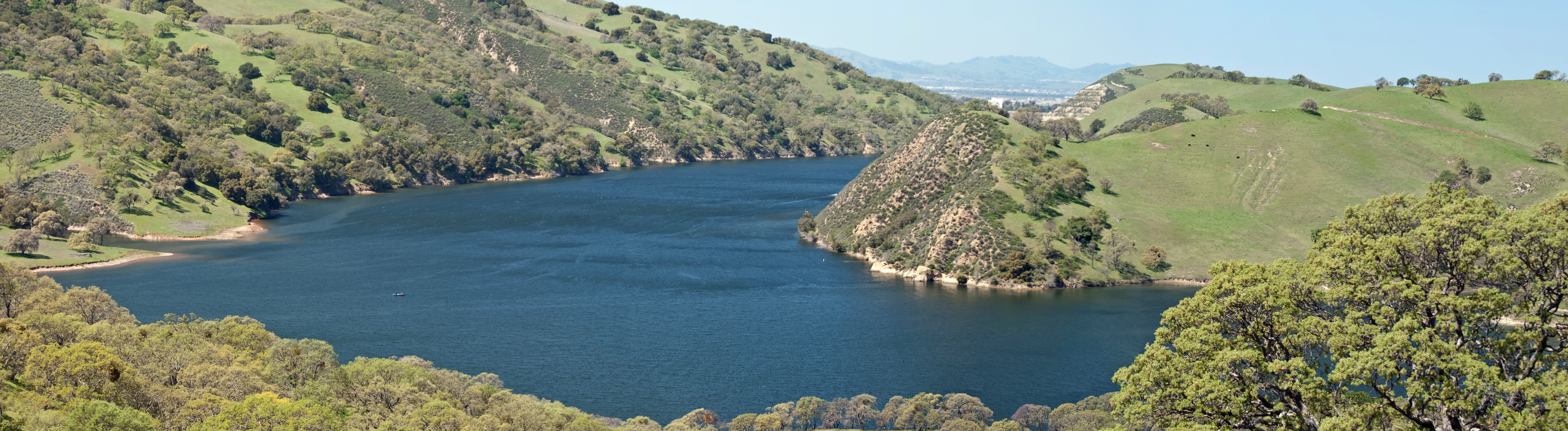
Lake Del Valle stores SWP water diverted through the South Bay Aqueduct for use in the San Francisco Bay Area.

The vast majority of the SWP water is drawn through the Delta's complex estuary system into the Clifton Court Forebay, located northwest of Tracy on the southern end of the Delta. Here, the Harvey O. Banks Pumping Plant lifts water 224 feet (68 m) into the California Aqueduct. Completed in 1963, the eleven pump units can lift up to 10,670 cu ft/s (302 m^{3}/s) of water – upgraded in 1986 from its original capacity of 6,400 cu ft/s (180 m^{3}/s) across seven units.

From here the water flows briefly south along the California Aqueduct to the 4,800 acre⋅ft (0.0059 km^{3}) Bethany Reservoir. The South Bay Pumping Plant supplies the South Bay Aqueduct, which has delivered water west to Alameda County since 1962 and Santa Clara County since 1965. The aqueduct carries a maximum of 188,000 acre⋅ft (0.232 km^{3}) per year. Up to 77,100 acre⋅ft (0.0951 km^{3}) of this water can be stored in Lake Del Valle, an offstream reservoir located near Livermore.

=== California Aqueduct ===
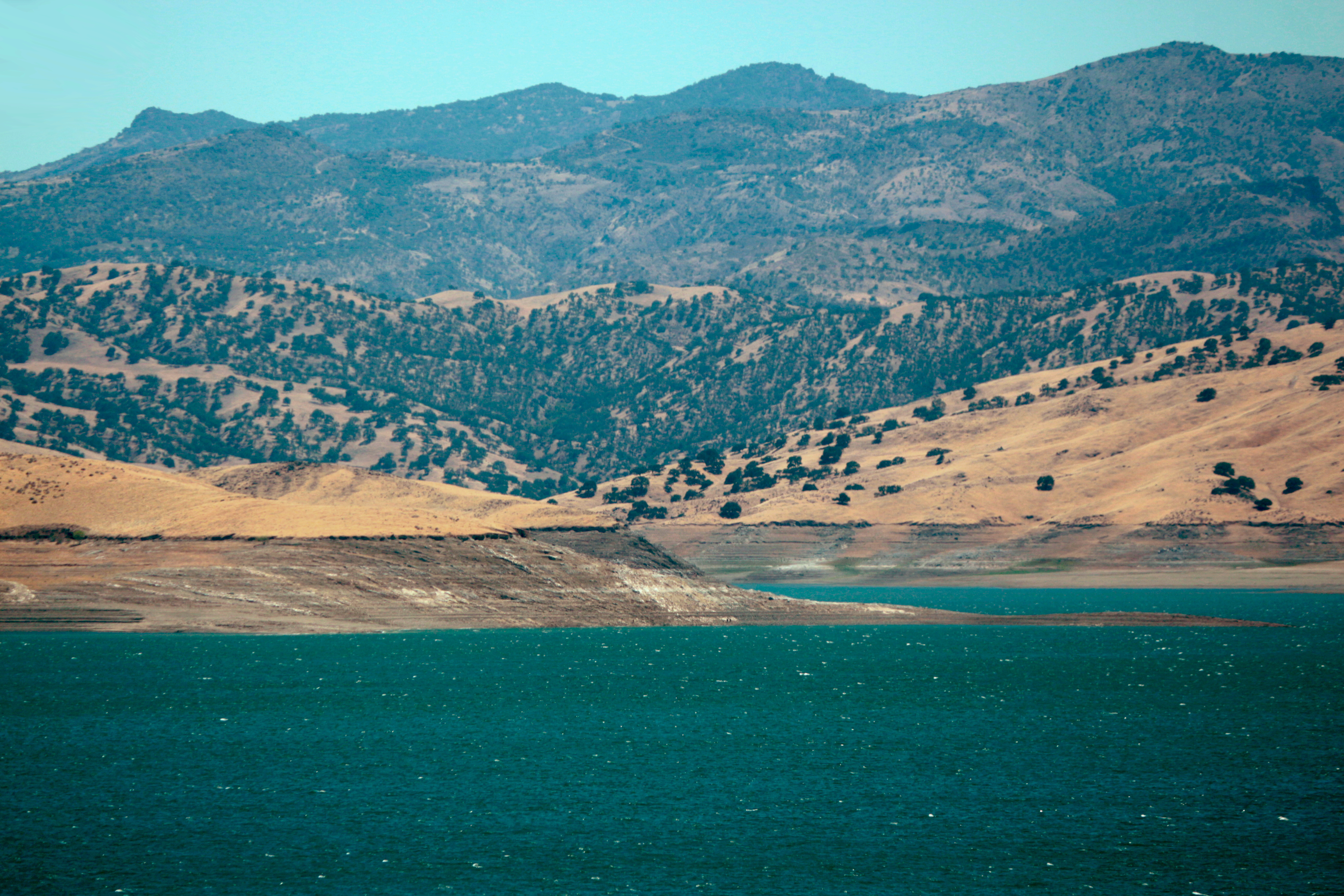
San Luis Reservoir in July 2021

South of the Bay Area diversions, the bulk of the SWP water – ranging from 1 to 3.7 million acre-feet (1.2 to 4.6 km^{3}) per year – travels south along the western flank of the San Joaquin Valley through the California Aqueduct. The main section of the aqueduct stretches for 304 miles (489 km); it is composed mainly of concrete-lined canals but also includes 20.7 miles (33.3 km) of tunnels, 130.4 miles (209.9 km) of pipelines and 27 miles (43 km) of siphons. The aqueduct reaches a maximum width of 300 feet (91 m) and a maximum depth of 30 feet (9.1 m); some parts of the channel are capable of delivering more than 13,000 cu ft/s (370 m^{3}/s). The section of the aqueduct that runs through the San Joaquin Valley includes multiple turnouts where water is released to irrigate roughly 750,000 acres (300,000 ha) of land on the west side of the valley.

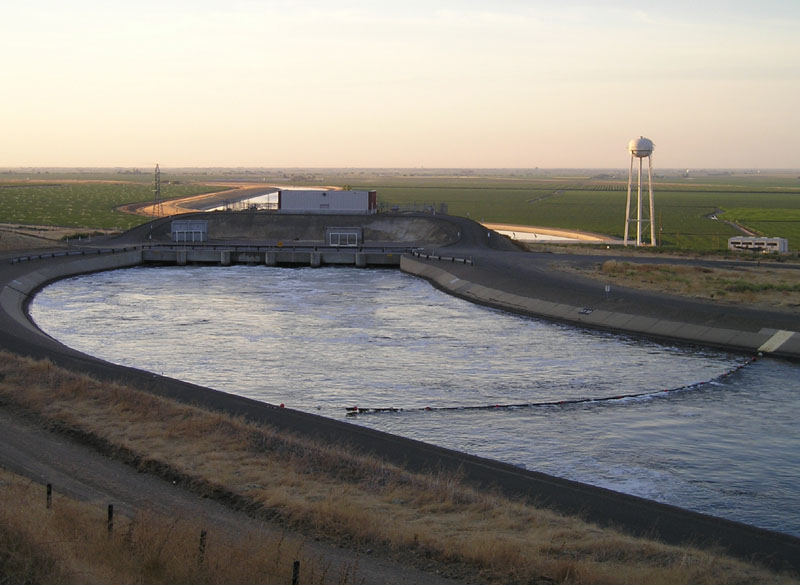
Dos Amigos Pumping Plant on the California Aqueduct

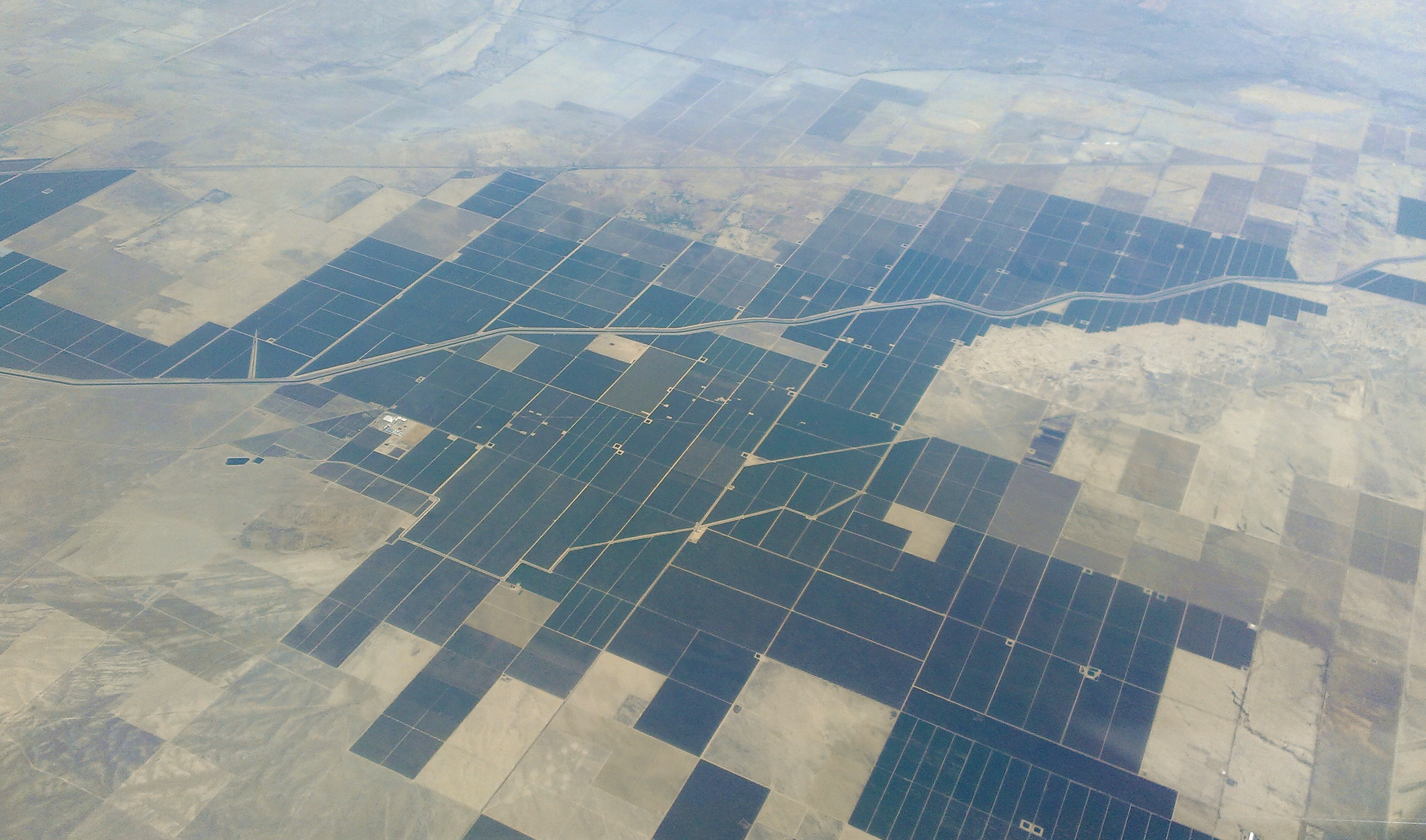
Aqueduct and surrounding farms in Kern County

The aqueduct enters the O'Neill Forebay reservoir west of Volta, where water can be pumped into a giant offstream storage facility, San Luis Reservoir, formed by the nearby B.F. Sisk Dam. San Luis Reservoir is shared by the SWP and the federal Central Valley Project; here water can be switched between the California Aqueduct and Delta-Mendota Canal to cope with fluctuating demands. The SWP has a 50 percent share of the 2.04 million acre-feet (2.52 km^{3}) of storage available in San Luis Reservoir.

South of the San Luis Reservoir complex, the aqueduct steadily gains elevation through a series of massive pumping plants. Dos Amigos Pumping Plant is located shortly south of San Luis, lifting the water 118 feet (36 m). Near Kettleman City, the Coastal Branch splits off from the main California Aqueduct. Buena Vista, Teerink and Chrisman Pumping Plants are located on the main aqueduct near the southern end of the San Joaquin Valley near Bakersfield. The aqueduct then reaches A.D. Edmonston Pumping Plant, which lifts the water 1,926 feet (587 m) over the Tehachapi Mountains that separate the San Joaquin Valley from Southern California. It is the highest pump-lift in the SWP, with a capacity of 4,480 cu ft/s (127 m^{3}/s) across fourteen units. Initial construction of Edmonston was completed in 1974, with the last three units installed in the 1980s.

Once reaching the crest of the Tehachapis, the aqueduct runs through a series of tunnels to the Tehachapi Afterbay, where its flow is partitioned between West and East Branches.

==== Coastal Branch ====
The Coastal Branch diverts about 48,000 acre⋅ft (0.059 km^{3}) per year from the California Aqueduct to parts of San Luis Obispo and Santa Barbara counties. The aqueduct stretches for 143 miles (230 km), and is mostly made up of buried pipeline. Pumping plants at Las Perillas, Badger Hill, Devil's Den, Bluestone, and Polonio Pass serve to lift the water over the California Coast Ranges. Once over the crest of the mountains, the water is reregulated in a series of small reservoirs numbered Tanks 1 through 5. The Coastal Branch was completed in 1994 following a severe drought that led to calls for importation of SWP water.

Through a pipeline known as the Central Coast Water Authority extension, completed in 1997, the Coastal Branch supplies water to Lake Cachuma, a 205,000 acre⋅ft (0.253 km^{3}) reservoir on the Santa Ynez River.

==== West Branch ====
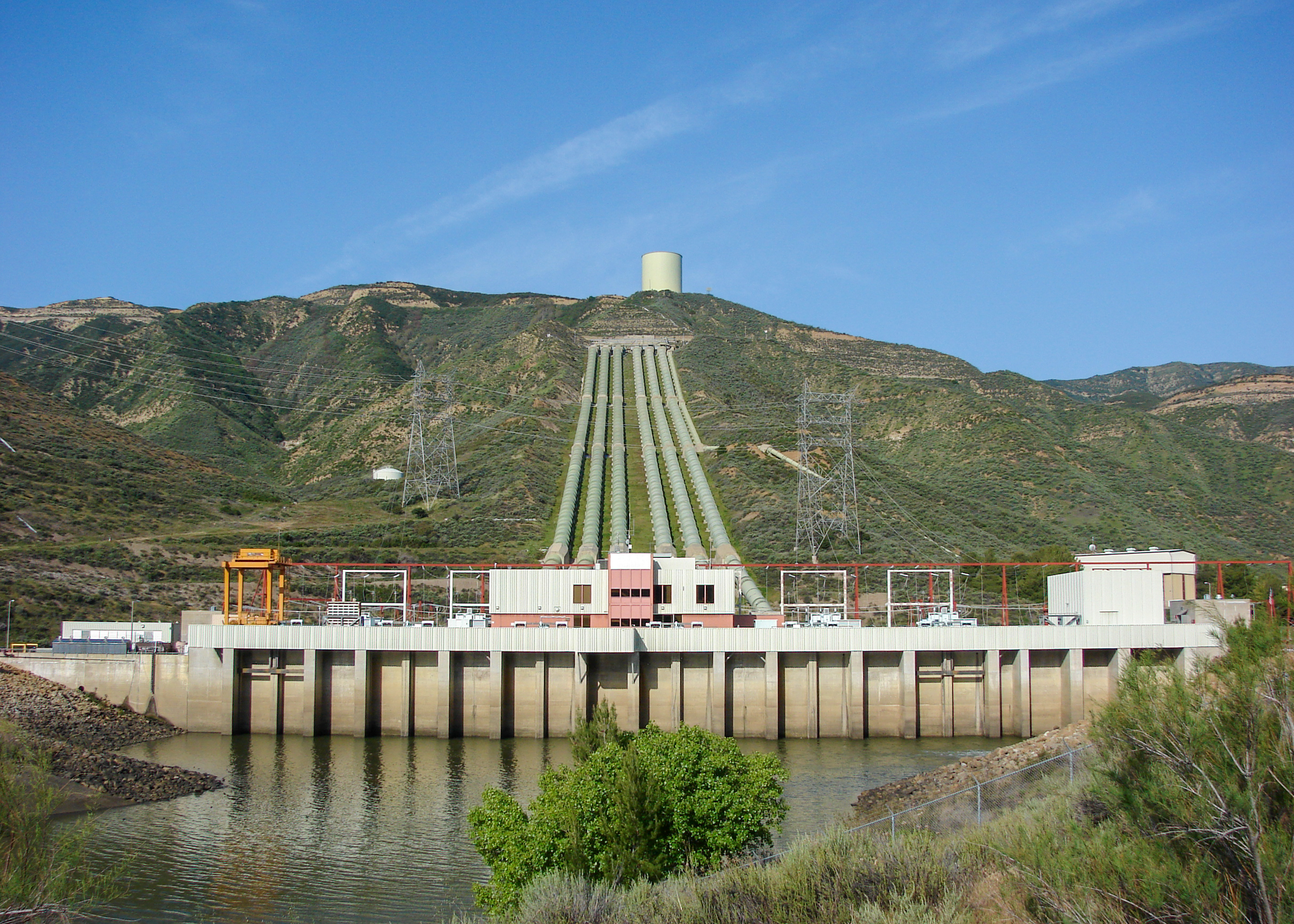
The terminus of the Angeles Tunnel at the Castaic Power Plant

From the terminus of the main California Aqueduct at Tehachapi Afterbay, the West Branch carries water to a second reservoir, Quail Lake, via the Oso Pumping Plant. The water then runs south by gravity to the 78 MW William E. Warne Powerplant, located on the 180,000 acre⋅ft (0.22 km^{3}) Pyramid Lake reservoir. The West Branch delivered about 537,000 acre⋅ft (0.662 km^{3}) per year for the period 1995–2010.

From Pyramid Lake, water is released through the Angeles Tunnel to the Castaic Power Plant on Elderberry Forebay and the 325,000 acre⋅ft (0.401 km^{3}) Castaic Lake reservoir located north of Santa Clarita. Castaic Power Plant is a pumped-storage hydroelectric plant capable of producing 1,247 MW on peak demand. Together, Pyramid and Castaic Lakes form the primary storage for West Branch water delivered to Southern California. Water is supplied to municipalities in Los Angeles and Ventura counties.

==== East Branch ====
The East Branch takes water from Tehachapi Afterbay along the north side of the San Gabriel Mountains and San Bernardino Mountains to the Silverwood Lake reservoir, which can hold 73,000 acre⋅ft (0.090 km^{3}). From here it passes through a tunnel under the San Bernardino Mountains to the Devil Canyon Powerplant, the largest "recovery plant", or aqueduct power plant, of the SWP system. The water then flows 28 miles (45 km) through the Santa Ana Tunnel to Lake Perris, which can store up to 131,400 acre⋅ft (0.1621 km^{3}).

Water deliveries through the East Branch averaged 995,000 acre⋅ft (1.227 km^{3}) per year from 1995 through 2012. The East Branch principally provides water for cities and farms in the Inland Empire, Orange County, and other areas south of Los Angeles. Through Lake Perris, the Metropolitan Water District of Southern California receives a large portion of its water from the SWP. Water is also supplied to the San Diego Aqueduct through a connection from Perris to Lake Skinner, further south.

== Proposed and unbuilt features ==
=== North Coast diversions ===
The original 1957 California Water Plan included provisions for dams on the Klamath, Eel, Mad and Smith Rivers of California's North Coast. Fed by prolific rainfall in the western Coast Ranges and Klamath Mountains, these rivers discharge more than 26 million acre-feet (32 km^{3}) to the Pacific each year, more than that of the entire Sacramento River system. The plan was basically a variation of a contemporary Bureau of Reclamation project, the Klamath Diversion.

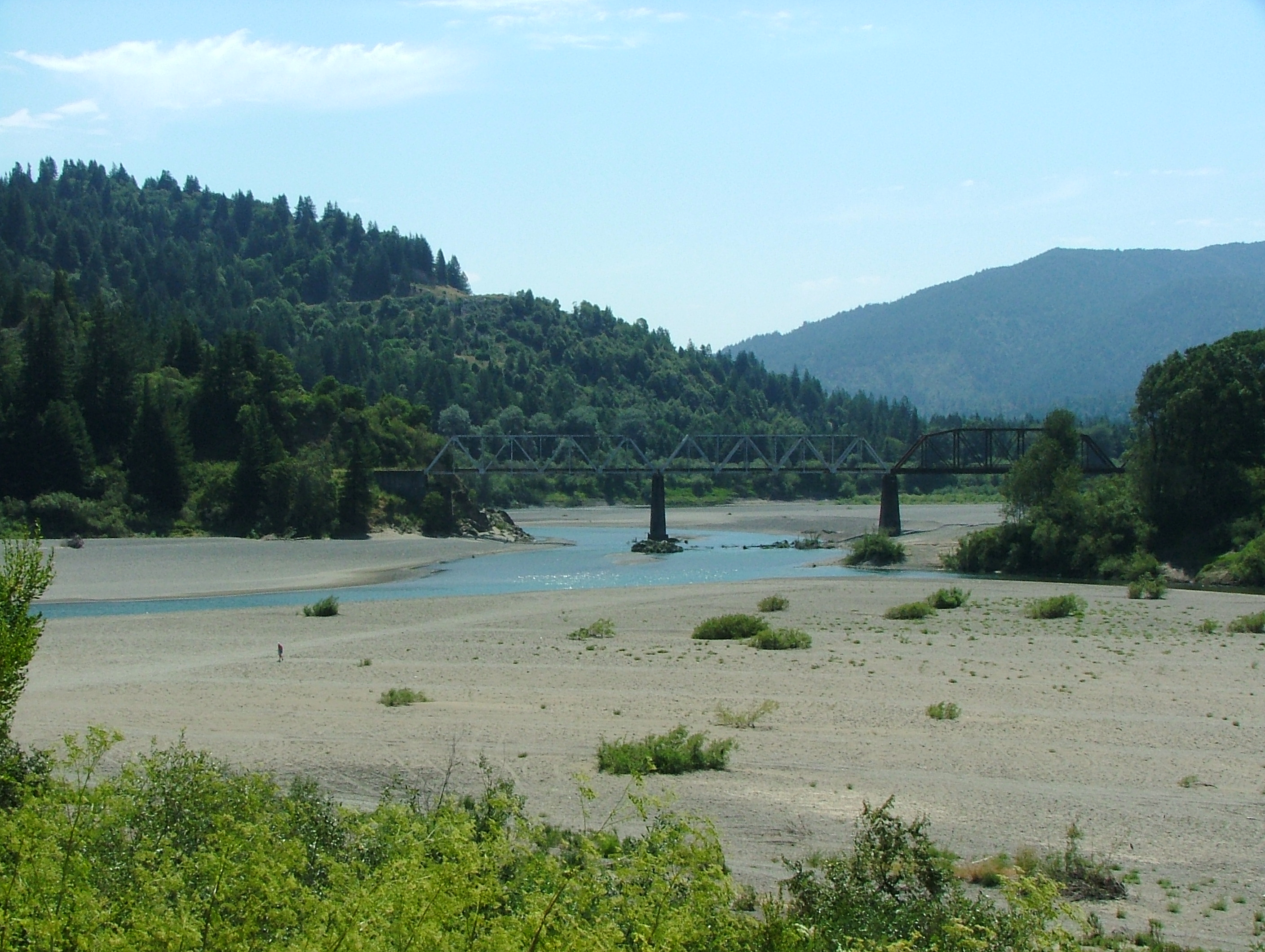
The Eel River was one of the rivers targeted for diversion by the SWP after damaging floods in 1964.

A series of dams in these watersheds would shunt water through interbasin transfers into the Klamath River system. The centerpiece of the project would be a 15-million-acre-foot (19 km^{3}) reservoir on the Klamath River – the largest man-made lake in California – from where the water would flow through the 60-mile (97 km) Trinity Tunnel into the Sacramento River, and thence to the canals and pump systems of the SWP. This would have provided between 5 and 10 million acre-feet (6.2 and 12.3 km^{3}) of water each year for the SWP. The diversion of the North Coast rivers, however were dropped from the initial SWP program.

In the mid-1960s, devastating flooding brought renewed interest in damming the North Coast rivers. The Department of Water Resources formed the State-Federal Interagency Task Force with the Bureau of Reclamation and the Army Corps of Engineers to develop plans for developing the rivers in the name of flood control – which would, incidentally, provide a way to divert some of their water into the SWP system. Although most of the proposed projects met their demise over political squabbles, one that persisted was the Dos Rios Project on the Eel River system, which would have involved constructing a gigantic dam on the Middle Fork of the Eel River, diverting water through the Grindstone Tunnel into the Sacramento Valley. Supporters of this project cited the disastrous Christmas flood of 1964 and the flood control benefits Dos Rios would provide to the Eel River basin.

The Klamath and Dos Rios diversions were heavily opposed by local towns and Native American tribes, whose land would have been flooded under the reservoirs. Fishermen expressed concerns over the impact of the dams on the salmon runs of North Coast rivers, especially the Klamath – the largest Pacific coast salmon river south of the Columbia River. The project would have eliminated 98 percent of the salmon spawning grounds on the Klamath. California Governor Ronald Reagan refused to approve the Dos Rios project, citing economic insensibility and fraudulent claims made by project proponents. The flood control benefits, for example, were largely exaggerated; the Dos Rios dam would have reduced the record 72-foot (22 m) Eel River flood crest of 1964 by only 8 inches (20 cm) had it been in place.

In 1980, the North Coast rivers were incorporated into the National Wild and Scenic Rivers system, effectively eliminating the possibility of any projects to divert them.

=== Peripheral Canal/California WaterFix/Delta Conveyance Project ===
Delta Conveyance Project, is a planned twin forty-foot (12 m) tunnel project that would extend through the center of the Delta, 150 feet (46 m) below ground. Earlier designs called for a Peripheral Canal to skirt the Delta to the east. The tunnels would draw water from the Sacramento River to bypass the Sacramento–San Joaquin River Delta, a vast estuary and agricultural region consisting of over 700 miles (1,100 km) of tidal waterways. Supporters of the canal and tunnel have included the Central Valley farmers and the Metropolitan Water District and urban developers in Los Angeles. They claim it would eliminate the need to pull water directly through this sensitive region, reducing salinity intrusion and water quality problems during the dry season. The canal was included in the initial SWP planning, and the lack of the canal is among the principal reasons the SWP has never been able to deliver its full entitlement.

Tunnel opponents believe the construction project would do extensive damage to the sensitive Delta ecosystem, farms and communities. Opponents also believe there will be long-term damage to the Delta ecosystem from fresh water being removed prior to flushing through the Delta and flowing more naturally to the San Francisco Bay.

Governor Jerry Brown had supported a ballot initiative approving the canal in the early 1980s, and stated his intention to finish the project in its tunnel form during his second governorship (2011–2019). His successor, Gavin Newsom, has also supported the project. Supporters of the tunnel argue that water being drawn from the southern intakes creates problems for wildlife and changes the natural flow in these areas, which would be corrected by drawing water from farther north. Supporters also claim that the California levees are also vulnerable to earthquakes and directing water away from them protects the supply of water. Delta farmers, communities, and commercial salmon and bass fishermen are especially concerned about the tunnel. However, some Delta scientists disagree. The new proposed canal would transport 1 million acre-feet (1.2 km^{3}) of water to Silicon Valley, southern California and the majority of it would be directed to the Central Valley, a location with political influence and interest in the canal being built.

=== Sites Reservoir ===
Since the 1980s, there has been interest in creating a large off-stream reservoir in the Sacramento Valley. Water "skimmed" off high winter flows in the Sacramento River would be pumped into a storage basin in the western side of the valley known as Sites Reservoir. The reservoir would hold about 1.8 million acre-feet (2.2 km^{3}) of water to be released into the Sacramento River during low-flow periods, boosting the water supply available for SWP entitlement holders and improving water quality in the Sacramento–San Joaquin Delta. This project has previously arisen in several forms, including proposals for a Glenn Reservoir or the Glenn-Colusa Complex on nearby streams, which would also have been receiving reservoirs for water sent east through the Dos Rios Project's Grindstone Tunnel or other transfers from North Coast rivers.

With its large storage capacity, Sites Reservoir would increase the production and flexibility of California's water management system, yielding 470,000 to 640,000 acre⋅ft (0.58 to 0.79 km^{3}) of new water per year. This project is being seriously considered by the Department of Water Resources, as California's water system is expected to face serious shortfalls of 2 million acre-feet (2.5 km^{3}) per year by 2020. However, the project has been criticized for its high cost, and potential disruption of fish migration when large amounts of water are drawn from the Sacramento River during the wet season.

=== Los Banos Grandes ===
The Los Banos Grandes reservoir was first proposed in 1983 and would have served a similar purpose to Sites. The 1.73-million-acre-foot (2.13 km^{3}) reservoir would have been located along the California Aqueduct several miles south of San Luis Reservoir, and would have allowed for the storage of water during wet years when extra water could be pumped from the Sacramento–San Joaquin Delta. Pumped-storage hydroelectric plants would have been built between Los Banos Grandes and the existing Los Banos flood-control reservoir, and between that reservoir and the aqueduct. The current status of Los Banos Grandes remains uncertain, as the DWR has been unable to appropriate funding since the 1990s.

== Modern issues ==
2000–2016 Percent Area in U.S. Drought Monitor Categories

The existing SWP facilities are collectively known as Stage I. Stage II, which includes such works as the Peripheral Canal and Sites Reservoir, was to have been built beginning in the late 1970s and 1980s – but due to concerted opposition from Northern Californians, environmentalist groups, and some economic interests, as well as the state's increasing debt, attempts to begin construction have all met with failure. Parties currently receiving SWP water are also opposed to its expansion, because water rates could be raised up to 300 percent to help pay for the cost. As a result, SWP capacity falls short by an average of 2 million acre-feet (2.5 km^{3}) each year; contractors only occasionally receive their full shares of water.

=== Cost disparity ===
The disparity of costs to the project's various constituents has been a continuing concern. Although the overall average cost of SWP water is $147 per acre-foot ($119 per 1,000 m^{3}), agricultural users pay far less than their urban counterparts for SWP water. The Kern County Water Agency (the second largest SWP entitlement holder) pays around $45–50 per acre-foot ($36–41 per 1,000 m^{3}) of SWP water, which is mostly used for irrigation. The Metropolitan Water District of Southern California (the largest entitlement holder) pays $298 per acre-foot ($241 per 1,000 m^{3}). This basically means that cities are subsidizing the cost of farm water, even though the cities also provided primary funding for the construction of the SWP.

=== Water issues ===
In the early 1970s, the SWP system still had a lot of "surplus" – water supply developed through the construction of Oroville Dam, which was running unused to the Pacific Ocean because the water delivery infrastructure for Southern California had not yet been completed (and when it was, southern California was slow to use the water). The surplus water was given for irrigation in the San Joaquin Valley instead. Because the water would only be a temporary supply, farmers were advised to use it for seasonal crops (such as alfalfa or hay) rather than permanent crops such as orchards. Nevertheless, many farmers used the water to develop new permanent crops, creating a dependency on SWP water that is technically part of Southern California's entitlement. This is now causing tensions as Southern California continues to increase its use of SWP water, decreasing the amount of surplus available to the system, especially in years of drought.

In dry years, water pumped from the Delta creates a hazard to spring-run salmon. As the Banks Pumping Plant pulls water from the Sacramento River southward across the Delta, it disrupts the normal flow direction of east to west that salmon smolt follow to the Pacific Ocean. Populations of salmon and steelhead trout have reached critically low levels in the decades after SWP water withdrawals began. The fish migration issue has become hotly contested in recent years, with rising support for the construction of the Peripheral Canal, which would divert water around the Delta, restoring the natural flow direction.

=== CALFED Bay- Delta Program ===
Water use and environmental problems associated with the SWP led to the creation of the CALFED Bay-Delta Program (CALFED) in 1994. The primary goals are to improve quality of SWP water while preventing further ecological damage in the Sacramento–San Joaquin Delta.

In January 2014, after the moderately dry year of 2012 and the record California drought of 2013, the Department of Water Resources announced that the SWP would be making zero deliveries that year, the first time in the project's history, due to dangerously low snowpack and reservoir levels. On April 18, 2014, the Department of Water Resources increased the SWP allocation back to five percent and that level remained until the initial allocation for 2015 was give on December 1, 2014.

In March 2025, the California Department of Water Resources announced that, after several storms in 2025, the SWP allocation forecast will be increased to 40% of requested water supplies, an increase of 5% compared to the previous month.

== Project data ==
=== Contracting water agencies ===
List of State Water Project water contractors
Agency or entity	Annual allocation		Share
	acre.ft	dam^{3}	
Alameda County Flood Control and Water Conservation District	80,619	99,442	1.9%
Alameda County Water District	42,000	52,000	1.0%
Antelope Valley-East Kern Water Agency	144,844	178,662	3.5%
Butte County	27,500	33,900	0.6%
Castaic Water Agency	95,200	117,400	2.3%
Coachella Valley Water District	138,350	170,650	3.3%
Crestline-Lake Arrowhead Water Agency	5,800	7,200	0.1%
Desert Water Agency	55,750	68,770	1.3%
Dudley Ridge Water District	45,350	55,940	1.1%
Empire West Side Irrigation District	3,000	3,700	<0.1%
Kern County Water Agency	982,730	1,212,180	23.5%
Kings County	9,305	11,478	0.2%
Littlerock Creek Irrigation District	2,300	2,800	<0.1%
Metropolitan Water District of Southern California	1,911,500	2,357,800	45.8%
Mojave Water Agency	85,800	105,800	2.1%
Napa County Flood Control and Water Conservation District	29,025	35,802	0.7%
Oak Flat Water District	5,700	7,000	<0.1%
Palmdale Water District	21,300	26,300	0.5%
Plumas County Flood Control & Water Conservation District	2,600	3,200	<0.1%
San Bernardino Valley Municipal Water District	102,600	126,600	2.5%
San Gabriel Valley Municipal Water District	28,800	35,500	0.7%
San Gorgonio Pass Water Agency	17,300	21,300	4.2%
San Luis Obispo County Flood Control and Water Conservation District	25,000	31,000	0.6%
Santa Barbara County Flood Control and Water Conservation District	45,486	56,106	1.1%
Santa Clara Valley Water District	100,000	120,000	2.4%
Solano County Water Agency	47,756	58,906	1.1%
Tulare Lake Basin Water Storage District	87,471	107,894	2.1%
Ventura County Watershed Protection District	20,000	25,000	0.5%
Yuba City	9,600	11,800	0.2%
Total	4,172,686	5,146,932	

=== Dams and reservoirs ===
†Background color denotes facility shared with Central Valley Project.

Dam	Reservoir	Year	Capacity		Stream	Purpose
			acre.ft	dam^{3}		
Antelope Dam	Antelope Lake	1964	47,466	58,548	Indian Creek	Storage
B.F. Sisk Dam†	San Luis Reservoir*	1967	1,020,500	1,258,800	San Luis Creek/ California Aqueduct	Storage
Bethany Dam	Bethany Reservoir	1967	5,250	6,480	California Aqueduct	Reregulation
Castaic Dam	Castaic Lake	1973	325,000	401,000	Castaic Creek/ West Branch California Aqueduct	Storage
Cedar Springs Dam	Silverwood Lake	1971	73,000	90,000	West Fork Mojave River/ East Branch California Aqueduct	Storage
Del Valle Dam	Lake Del Valle/ South Bay Aqueduct	1968	77,000	95,000	Arroyo Valle	Storage
Elderberry Forebay Dam	Elderberry Forebay	1974	24,800	30,600	Castaic Creek/ West Branch California Aqueduct	Power; Reregulation
Fish Barrier Dam		1964			Feather River	Mitigation
Frenchman Dam	Frenchman Lake	1961	55,477	68,430	Little Last Chance Creek	Storage
Grizzly Valley Dam	Lake Davis	1966	83,000	102,000	Big Grizzly Creek	Storage
Little Panoche Detention Dam †	Little Panoche Reservoir	1966	5,580	6,880	Little Panoche Creek	Flood control
Los Banos Detention Dam †	Los Banos Reservoir	1965	34,600	42,700	Los Banos Creek	Flood control
O'Neill Dam†	O'Neill Forebay	1967	56,400	69,600	San Luis Creek/ California Aqueduct	Reregulation
Oroville Dam	Lake Oroville	1968	3,537,577	4,363,537	Feather River	Storage; Power; Flood control
Perris Dam	Lake Perris	1973	131,400	162,100	East Branch California Aqueduct	Storage
Pyramid Dam	Pyramid Lake	1970	180,000	220,000	Piru Creek/ West Branch California Aqueduct	Storage; Power
Quail Lake Dam	Quail Lake		7,580	9,350	West Branch California Aqueduct	Reregulation
Tehachapi Afterbay Dam	Tehachapi Afterbay				California Aqueduct	Reregulation
Thermalito Afterbay Dam	Thermalito Afterbay	1968	57,040	70,360	Offstream	Power; Storage
Thermalito Diversion Dam	Diversion Pool	1968	13,350	16,470	Feather River	Power
Thermalito Forebay Dam	Thermalito Forebay	1968	11,770	14,520	Offstream	Power
Total			5,746,790	7,088,560		

*This is the portion of total capacity of San Luis Reservoir allocated to SWP; the total capacity is 2,041,000 acre⋅ft (2,518,000 dam^{3})

=== Aqueducts ===
Aqueduct	Length		Annual deliveries		Areas served
	mi	km	acre.ft	dam^{3}	
California Aqueduct	304	489	2,300,000	2,800,000	San Joaquin Valley; All SWP aqueducts except for North Bay
Coastal Branch California Aqueduct	143	230	48,000	59,000	San Luis Obispo County; Santa Barbara County
East Branch California Aqueduct	140	230	995,000	1,227,000	Riverside County; San Bernardino County; Orange County
North Bay Aqueduct	27.4	44.1	120,000	150,000	Napa County; Solano County
South Bay Aqueduct			188,000	232,000	Alameda County; Santa Clara County
West Branch California Aqueduct	24.7	39.8	537,000	662,000	Ventura County; Los Angeles County

=== Pump plants ===
Pumping plants
Name	Aqueduct	Lift	
		ft	m
Banks	California Aqueduct	244	74
Dos Amigos	California Aqueduct	118	36
Buena Vista	California Aqueduct	205	62
Teerink	California Aqueduct	233	71
Chrisman	California Aqueduct	518	158
Edmonston	California Aqueduct	1,926	587
Pearblossom	East Branch California Aqueduct	540	160
Las Perillas	Coastal Branch California Aqueduct	55	17
Badger Hill	Coastal Branch California Aqueduct	151	46
Devil's Den	Coastal Branch California Aqueduct	521	159
Bluestone	Coastal Branch California Aqueduct	484	148
Polonio Pass	Coastal Branch California Aqueduct	533	162
Barker Slough	North Bay Aqueduct	120	37
Cordelia	North Bay Aqueduct	138	42
South Bay	South Bay Aqueduct	566	173
Del Valle	South Bay Aqueduct	38	12
Oso	West Branch California Aqueduct	231	70
Pearblossom	East Branch California Aqueduct	540	160

=== Powerplants ===
Name	Watercourse	Capacity	Annual generation (2010)	Type
Alamo	East Branch California Aqueduct	17 MW	79 GWh	Recovery
Castaic	West Branch California Aqueduct	1,247 MW	624 GWh	Pumped-storage
Devil Canyon	East Branch California Aqueduct	240 MW	993 GWh	Recovery
Foothill Feeder	West Branch California Aqueduct	11 MW	47 GWh	Recovery
Gianelli (San Luis)	Offstream	424 MW	200 GWh	Pumped-storage
Hyatt (Oroville)	Feather River	819 MW	1,386 GWh	Pumped-storage
Mojave Siphon	East Branch California Aqueduct	32.4 MW	63 GWh	Recovery
Thermalito	Offstream	120 MW	179 GWh	Pumped-storage
Thermalito Diversion	Feather River	3.3 MW	10 GWh	Conventional
Warne	West Branch California Aqueduct	78 MW	266 GWh	Recovery
		2,991.7 MW		

- Conventional: Power plant utilizing flow of river or stream through dam
- Pumped-storage: See Pumped-storage hydroelectricity
- Recovery: Power plant utilizing flow of aqueduct or canal

== See also ==
- Central Valley Project
- Patrick D. McGee (1916–70), California State Assembly member who fought for the State Water Project
- Peripheral Canal
- Water in California
- South–North Water Transfer Project, a project with similar goals in China

== Works cited ==
- Agee, James K. (2007). Steward's Fork: A Sustainable Future for the Klamath Mountains. University of California Press. ISBN 978-0-52093-379-8.
- Reisner, Marc (1993). Cadillac Desert. Penguin. ISBN 0-14-017824-4.
