= Josh Harder =

American politician (born 1986)

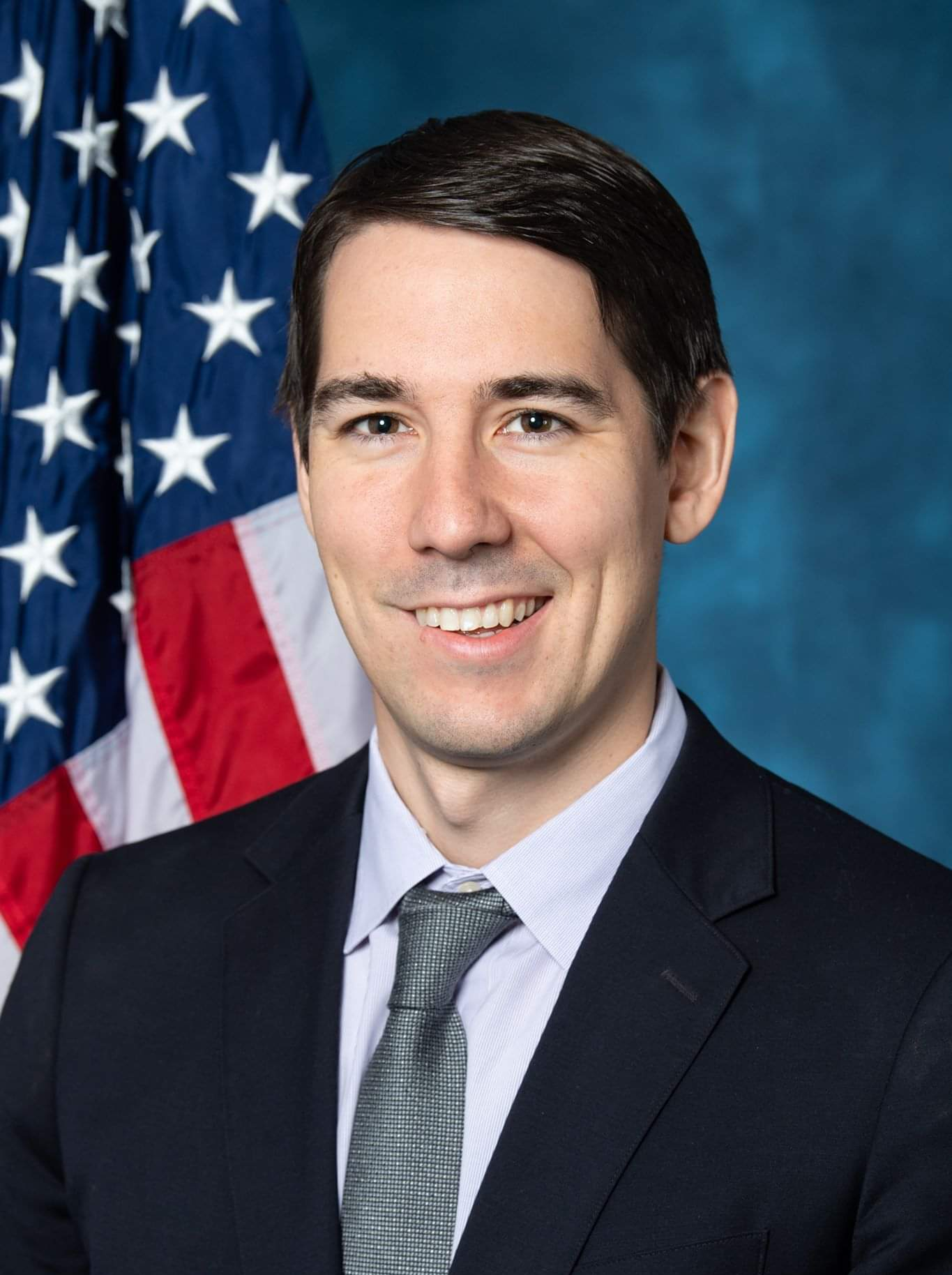
- Official portrait, c. 2019–2021

Member of the U.S. House of Representatives from California
- Incumbent
- Assumed office January 3, 2019
- Preceded by: Jeff Denham
- Constituency: 10th district (2019–2023); 9th district (2023–present)

Personal details
- Born: Joshua Keck Harder; August 1, 1986 (age 40) Turlock, California, U.S.
- Party: Democratic
- Spouse: Pamela Sud (m. 2018)
- Children: 2
- Education: Stanford University (BA); Harvard University (MBA, MPP)
- Website: House website Campaign website
- Harder's voice Harder supporting the recognition of the Assyrian Genocide; Recorded July 29, 2021

Joshua Keck Harder (born August 1, 1986) is an American politician who has served as the U.S. representative for California's 9th congressional district since 2023, after representing the 10th district from 2019 to 2023. A member of the Democratic Party, he was first elected in 2018 by defeating Republican incumbent Jeff Denham. After the 2020 redistricting, he won reelection in the newly drawn 9th district, which covers the majority of San Joaquin County and includes Stockton, Tracy, Lodi, and Manteca.

In the House, Harder serves on the Appropriations Committee and is a vice chair of the center-left New Democrat Coalition. He has repeatedly introduced legislation to block the Delta Conveyance Project and has sponsored bills on fentanyl abuse and utility rates. After his district was redrawn following Proposition 50 in 2025, Harder finished first in the June 2026 primary and faces Republican John McBride in the November 2026 general election.

== Early life and education ==
Harder was born on August 1, 1986, in Turlock, California. His great-great-grandfather settled nearby in Manteca, where he started a peach farm. Harder attended Modesto High School, and during that time, he interned for then state senator Jeff Denham. He went on to attend Stanford University, earning a Bachelor of Arts degree in 2008. He later obtained a joint Master of Business Administration and Master of Public Policy from the Harvard Business School and the John F. Kennedy School of Government.

== Private career ==
In 2014, Bessemer Venture Partners hired Harder in its New York office. He moved to San Francisco two years later and became a vice president of the company. In 2017, Harder left Bessemer to campaign full-time. He moved back to Turlock and also taught business at Modesto Junior College.

== U.S. House of Representatives ==
=== Elections ===
==== 2018 ====
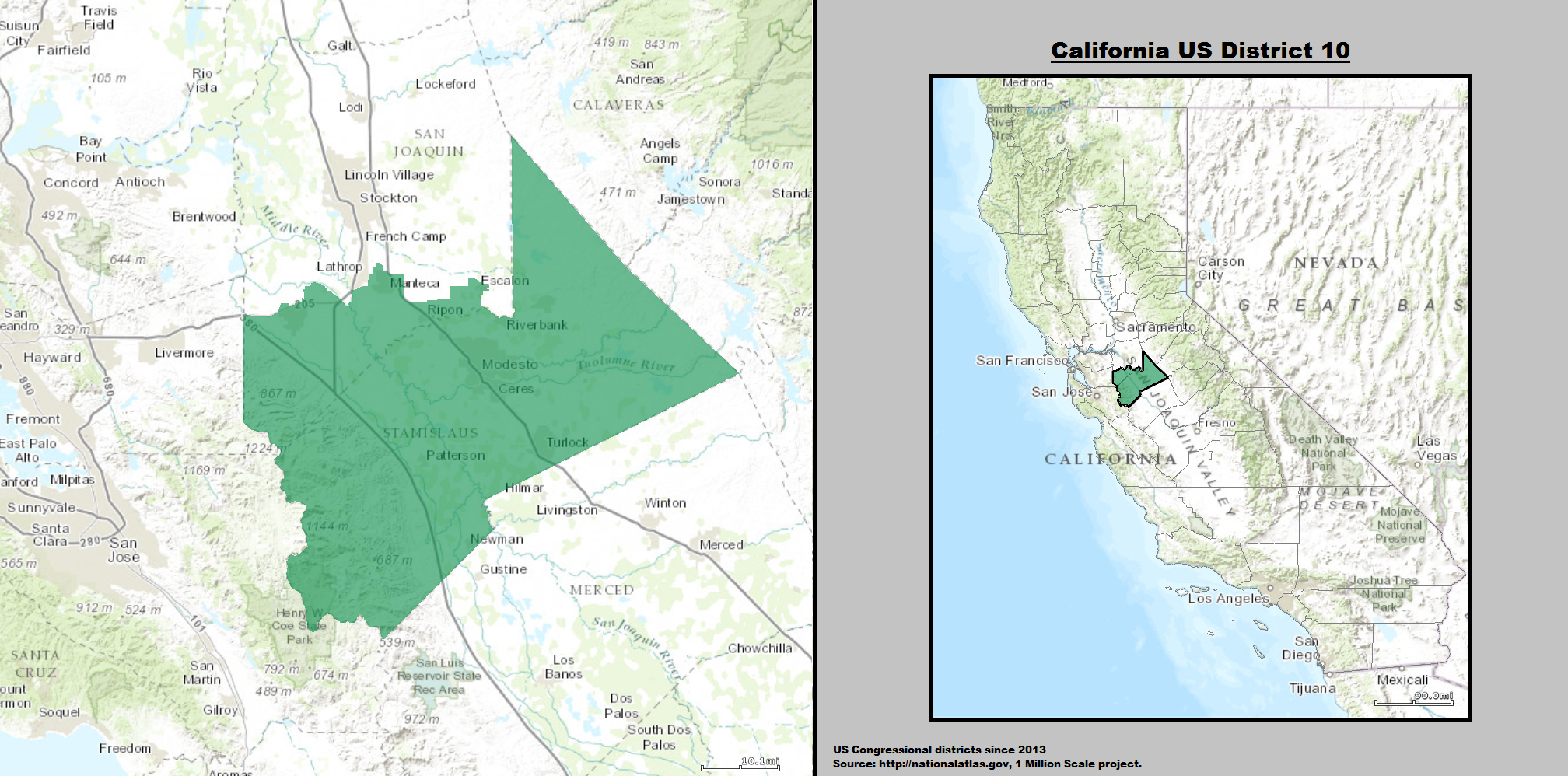
California's 10th district (2013–2023), including Modesto and Tracy in the Central Valley

In May 2017, Harder announced his candidacy, joining three other Democrats to challenge Republican Jeff Denham, who had represented California's 10th congressional district since 2013 and represented the 19th district from 2011 to 2013. As a result of California's top-two primary system, Denham and Harder advanced to the general election, with Denham taking 37.5% of the primary vote and Harder 16.7%.

California's 10th district was included on the list of Republican-held seats being targeted by the Democratic Congressional Campaign Committee in 2018. On election night and for days after the election, Denham led in the reported results. On November 9, Harder pulled ahead as absentee ballots were counted. Days later, news outlets projected Harder's victory, and on November 14, Denham conceded.

==== 2020 ====
Harder ran for reelection in 2020, finishing first in the top-two open primary with 44% of the vote. He bested Republican opponents Ted Howze and Bob Elliott. Harder and Howze advanced to the general election on November 3, which Harder won with 55.2% of the vote to Howze's 44.8%. In 2020, former president Barack Obama endorsed Harder.

==== 2022 ====
California's 10th district since 2023, centered on Stockton in the Central Valley

Following redistricting, Harder defeated San Joaquin County Supervisor Tom Patti, a Republican, with 56% of the vote in California's 9th congressional district.

==== 2024 ====
In the 2024 general election, Harder defeated Republican Kevin Lincoln with 51.8% of the vote, or approximately 9,000 votes.

==== 2026 ====
Lincoln initially announced a rematch against Harder in July 2025. California voters approved Proposition 50, a mid-decade redistricting measure redrew the state's maps, including for the 9th district. The changes have made the district a "Solid Democratic" seat, with Democratic voter registration in the district rising from 40% to 46% and the Cook Partisan Voting Index became D+8. Two days after Proposition 50's passage, Lincoln announced that he was running against Adam Gray in the 13th district instead.

In the June 2026 top-two primary, Harder finished first with 60.8% of the vote. He faces Republican John McBride in November.

=== Tenure ===
Harder took office on January 3, 2019, as the U.S. representative for California's 10th congressional district. During the 116th Congress, he served on the Agriculture Committee and the Education and Labor Committee. In November 2019, he co-introduced the Ban Corporate PACs Act with Representative Max Rose, which aimed to prohibit for-profit corporations from sponsoring, operating, or funding political action committees.

After Trump supporters stormed the United States Capitol on January 6, 2021, Harder received hate mail intended for Josh Hawley, a United States senator with a similar name who objected to certifying Joe Biden's electoral college victory.

In the 117th Congress, he was appointed to the Appropriations Committee while continuing to serve on the Agriculture Committee. In November, Harder attended the signing of the Bipartisan Infrastructure Law of 2021.

In 2025, Harder was one of 46 House Democrats who joined all Republicans to vote for the Laken Riley Act.

Harder has introduced several bills aimed at limiting utilities like Pacific Gas and Electric Company to one rate increase request per year. He introduced a bill in 2025 that would require the California Public Utilities Commission to post all of its interactions with regulated utilities online, to try to put pressure on rate increases.

=== Committee assignments ===
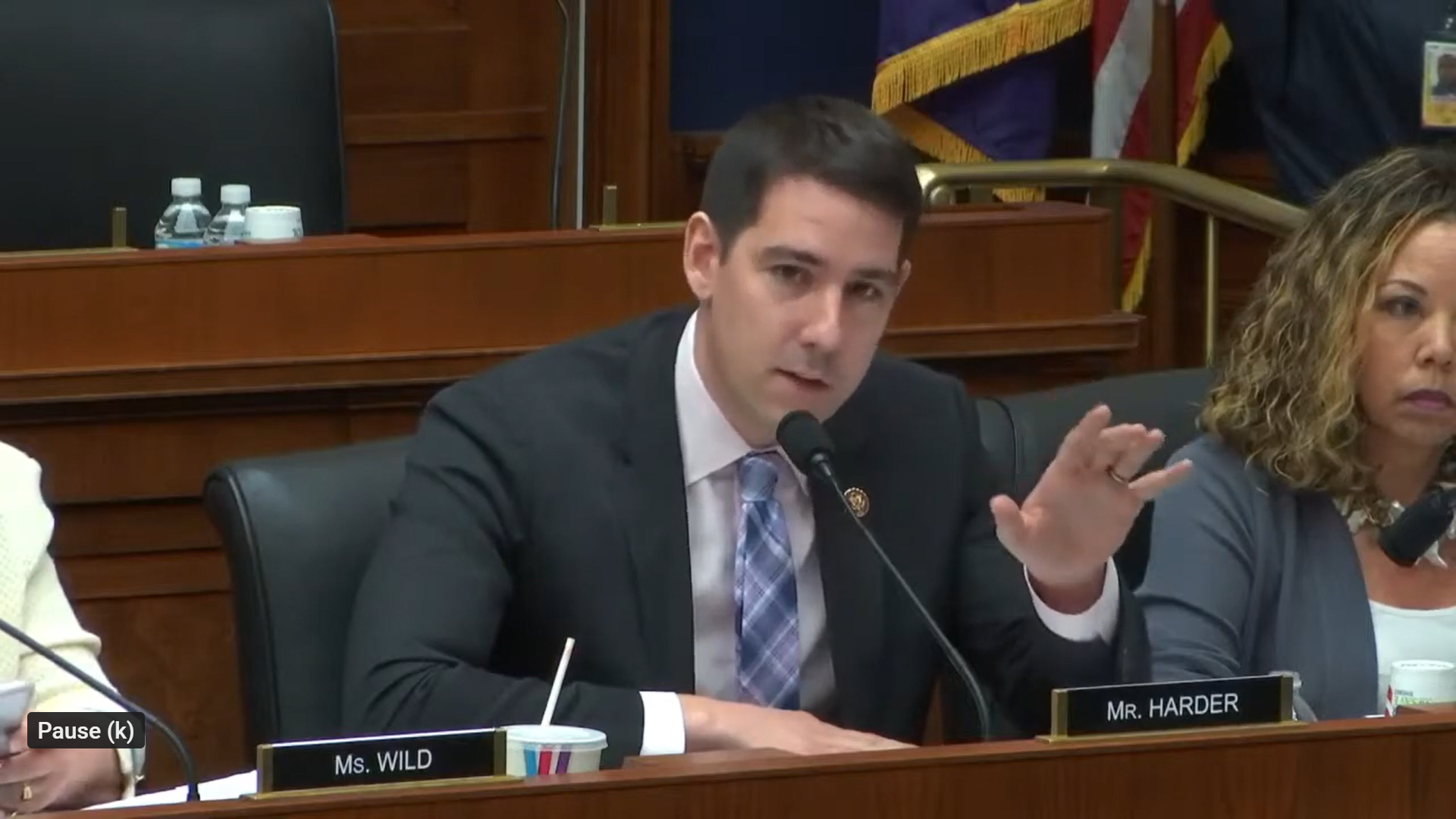
Harder on the Education and Labor Committee, 2019

For the 119th Congress:

- Committee on Appropriations
  - Subcommittee on Interior, Environment, and Related Agencies
  - Subcommittee on Labor, Health and Human Services, Education, and Related Agencies

=== Caucus memberships ===
- New Democrat Coalition
- Problem Solvers Caucus
- Congressional Asian Pacific American Caucus

== Political positions ==
Harder has been described as a moderate Democrat. He supports legal abortion rights.

=== Delta Tunnels ===
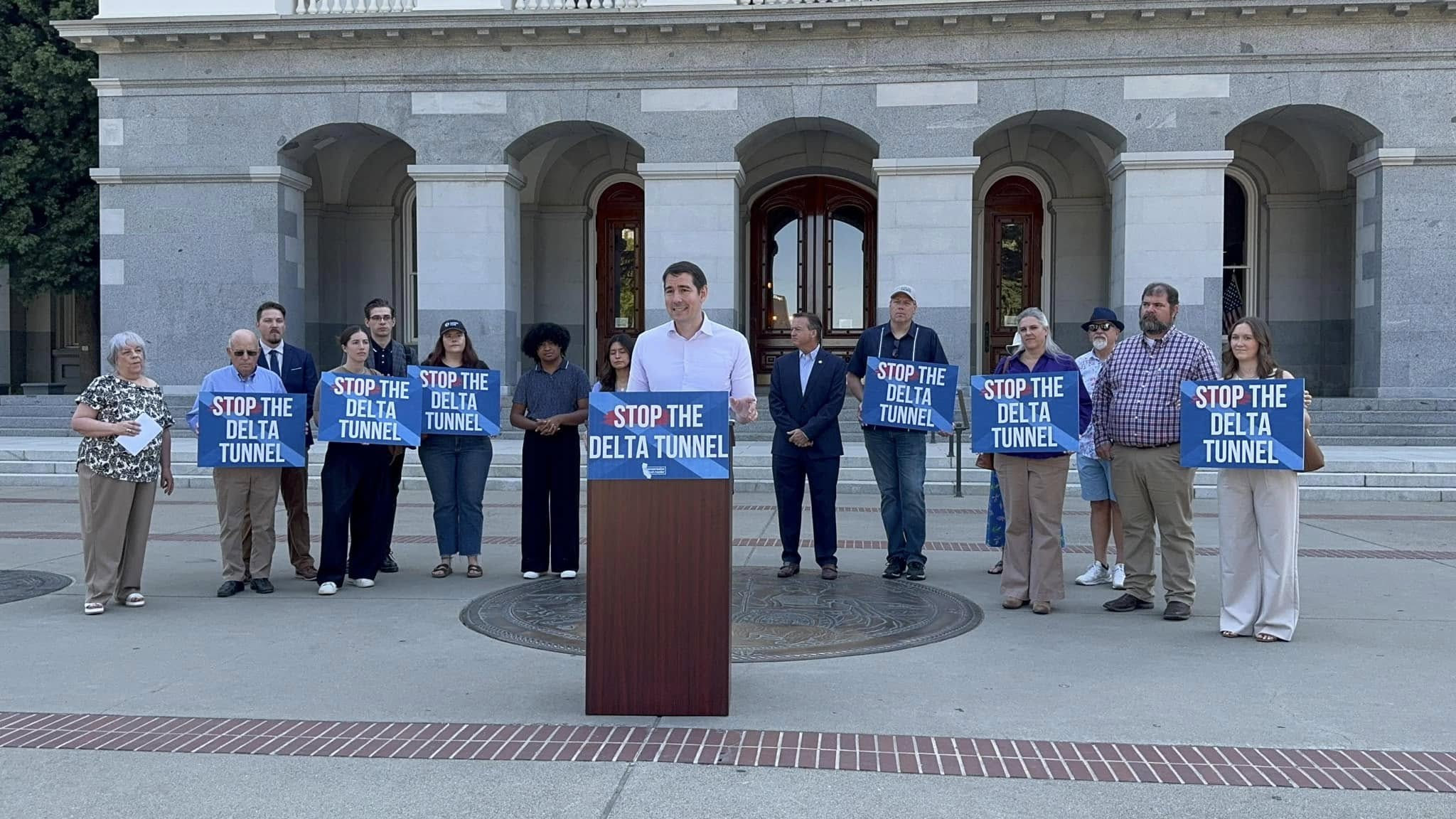
Harder speaks against the Delta Tunnel, 2024

In February 2023, Harder introduced the Stop the Delta Tunnels Act, a bill which would forbid the Secretary of Army from issuing a permit related to the project, effectively stopping all federal support for the Delta Conveyance Project. In May 2023, Harder criticized California Governor Gavin Newsom's plan to fast-track projects, including the Delta Tunnel project, which Harder had opposed for five years, saying that that project could negatively impact the ecosystem of the Delta in the San Joaquin Valley and affect fishery and agriculture industries.

=== Policing ===
Harder opposes defunding the police and has said that he wants to rebuild trust between the public and police. He voted for a police reform bill that would ban chokeholds and establish a policy for use of force that would be standard around the country. In 2023, he introduced a bill to create a grant program that would allow smaller police departments to recruit and retain more officers. In June 2025, Harder introduced the Safer Response Act with Republican Mike Lawler to reauthorize grants for training and technical assistance for first responders handling fentanyl overdoses.

== Personal life ==
Harder and his wife, Pamela, met as undergraduate students at Stanford University. They were married at the Meadowlark Botanical Gardens in Virginia in 2018. Harder and his wife have two daughters.

== Electoral history ==
Electoral history of Josh Harder
Year	Office		Party	Primary			General			Result	Swing	Ref.
Year	Office		Party	Total	%	P.	Total	%	P.	Result	Swing	Ref.
2018	U.S. House	10th	Democratic	20,742	17.04%	2nd	115,945	52.25%	1st	Won	Gain	
2020	U.S. House	10th	Democratic	69,668	44.07%	1st	166,865	55.16%	1st	Won	Hold	
2022	U.S. House	9th	Democratic	39,026	36.71%	1st	95,598	54.82%	1st	Won	Hold	
2024	U.S. House	9th	Democratic	60,978	49.75%	1st	130,183	51.79%	1st	Won	Hold	
2026	U.S. House	9th	Democratic	79,946	60.78%	1st	TBD					
Source: Secretary of State of California | Statewide Election Results

U.S. House of Representatives
Preceded by Jeff Denham	Member of the U.S. House of Representatives from California's 10th congressional district 2019–2023	Succeeded by Mark DeSaulnier
Preceded by Jerry McNerney	Member of the U.S. House of Representatives from California's 9th congressional district 2023–present	Incumbent
U.S. order of precedence (ceremonial)
Preceded by Michael Guest	United States representatives by seniority 206th	Succeeded by Jahana Hayes
