= Solano County Water Agency =

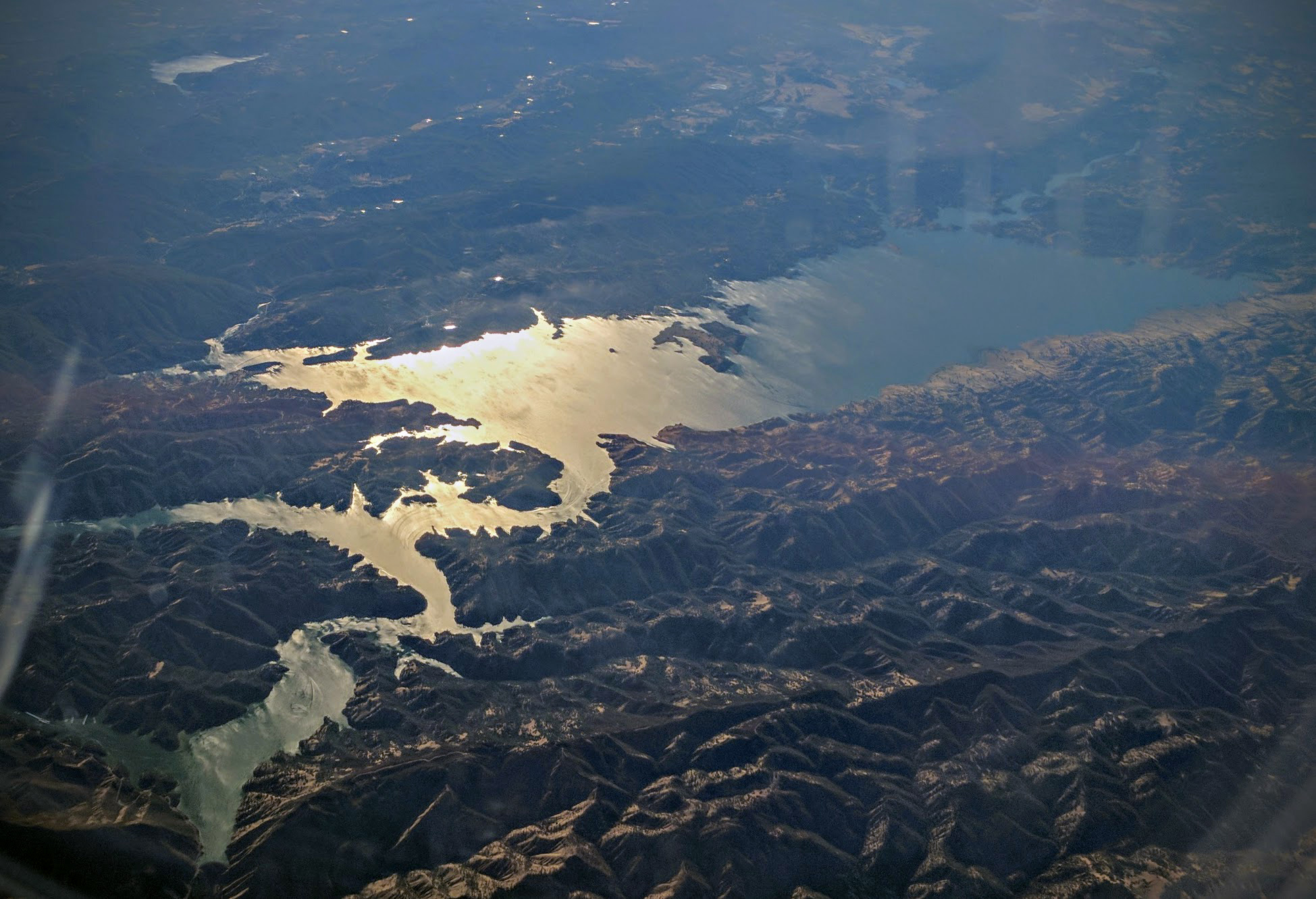
Aerial photograph of Lake Berryessa

The Solano County Water Agency (SCWA) is a wholesale water agency that services the different cities and agricultural districts throughout Solano County, California by providing untreated water from the Federal Solano Water Project and the North Bay Aqueduct of the State Water Project. These cities include Benicia, Dixon, Fairfield, Rio Vista, Suisun City, Vacaville, and Vallejo. In addition to providing wholesale water, the SCWA partakes in flood management and habitat conservation activities such as the Ulatis Flood Control Project and Green Valley Flood Control Project.

== History of Solano County Water Agency ==
Through an act of the State Legislature, the SCWA was created in 1951. However, it was originally known as the "Solano County Flood Control and Water Conservation District" (SCFC&WCD). The full text of the legislation can be found in the California Water Code Appendix Chapter 64, under "Solano County Water Agency".

The first major action of the Solano County Flood Control and Water Conservation District was to make a contract with the United States Bureau of Reclamation (USBR) for water supply from the Solano Project. Then, in 1988, the act was amended to change the governing board. A year later, the name of SCFC&WCD was changed to what it is known as today, the Solano County Water Agency.

The boundaries of SCWA include the entirety of Solano County, the property of the University of California Davis in Yolo County, as well as 2,800 acres of Reclamation District No. 2068 also in Yolo County.

In October 1989, SCWA hired its first employee under the position of General Manager, and in 1990, additional employees were added. Prior to this, SCWA was run by the County Transportation Department and other County departments that provided staff and administrative services.

Today, SCWA vows to protect the rights of existing water sources, actively participates in efforts to secure new sources of water for water supply reliability and future growth in the county.

== Board of directors ==
The SCWA's board of directors is composed of the five members of the Solano County Board of Supervisors, the seven mayors of the cities in Solano County, and a director from each of the three agricultural districts that provide retail agricultural supply.

SCWA's Board of Directors
Solano County Board of Supervisors	Mayors in Solano County	Agricultural Districts and Directors
District 1: Supervisor Erin Hannigan	Benicia: Mayor Steve Young	Maine Prairie Water District: Director Ryan Mahoney
District 2: Supervisor Monica Brown	Dixon: Mayor Steve Bird	Reclamation District 2068: Director Dale Crossley
District 3: Supervisor Jim Spering	Fairfield: Mayor Harry Price	Solano Irrigation District: Supervisor Mitch Mashburn
District 4: Supervisor John Vasquez	Rio Vista: Mayor Ron Kott	
District 5: Supervisor Mitch Mashburn	Suisun City: Mayor Lori Wilson	
	Vacaville: Mayor Ron Rowlett	
	Vallejo: Mayor Rober McConnell	

== Water Supply ==
The population of Solano County in 2021 was estimated to be 451,716. SCWA provides these residents and businesses water with the help of the North Bay Aqueduct, the Solano Project, and Putah Creek.

The North Bay Aqueduct, or N.B.A. as part of the SWP has rights to water that originates from the Sacramento and San Joaquin Rivers, storing the water in Lake Oroville and is an underground pipeline that runs from Barker Slough in the Delta to Cordelia Forebay in western Fairfield. From there, the water is pumped to Napa County, Vallejo, and Benicia. Additionally, N.B.A. serves the Travis Air Force Base. Pumping began in 1988 where the maximum pumping capacity was around 175 cubic feet per second (cfs). Since then, the daily pumping rates have ranged between 0 and near pipeline capacity. Peak pumping occurs during the summer where rates are 50-125 cfs and lower pumping occurs during the winter at 0-49 cfs. Today however, pumping tests have shown that the N.B.A. can deliver 142 cfs rather than the original 175 cfs flow it was designed and contracted for. The N.B.A. is operated remotely by the California Department of Water Resources (DWR) at the Delta Field Division office near Tracy.

The Solano Project is part of a federal project with the Bureau of Reclamation. Ideas for the Solano Project were conceived in the 1940s and 1950s to help meet the water demands of agriculture, municipalities and military facilities within Solano County. Originally designed to irrigate approximately 96,000 acres of land, as of 1992, the total irrigated areas was 71,445 acres. Putah Creek serves as the source for water for the Solano Project and stores water in Lake Berryessa. The main project feature is the Monticello Dam. Other project features include the Putah Diversion Damn, Putah South Canal with a small terminal reservoir, and the necessary wasteways, laterals and drainage works.

- The Monticello Dam was constructed from 1953 to 1957 and has a height of 304 feet, a crest length of 1023 feet, and has the ability to hold a capacity of 1.55 million acre-feet of water.

An integral part of the SCWA is the Putah Creek watershed which lies on the eastern slope of the Coast Range, south of the Cache Creek drainage and north of the Napa Valley. Additionally, the SCWA provides water the Lower Putah Creek for environmental protection and to meet valid water rights.To better manage the Putah Creek watershed, the creek is divided into the "Upper Drainage" which is the 576 square mile area upstream of Monticello Dam, and the "Lower Drainage" that encompasses the smaller and less define area between the dam and the Yolo Bypass.

== Glory Hole ==
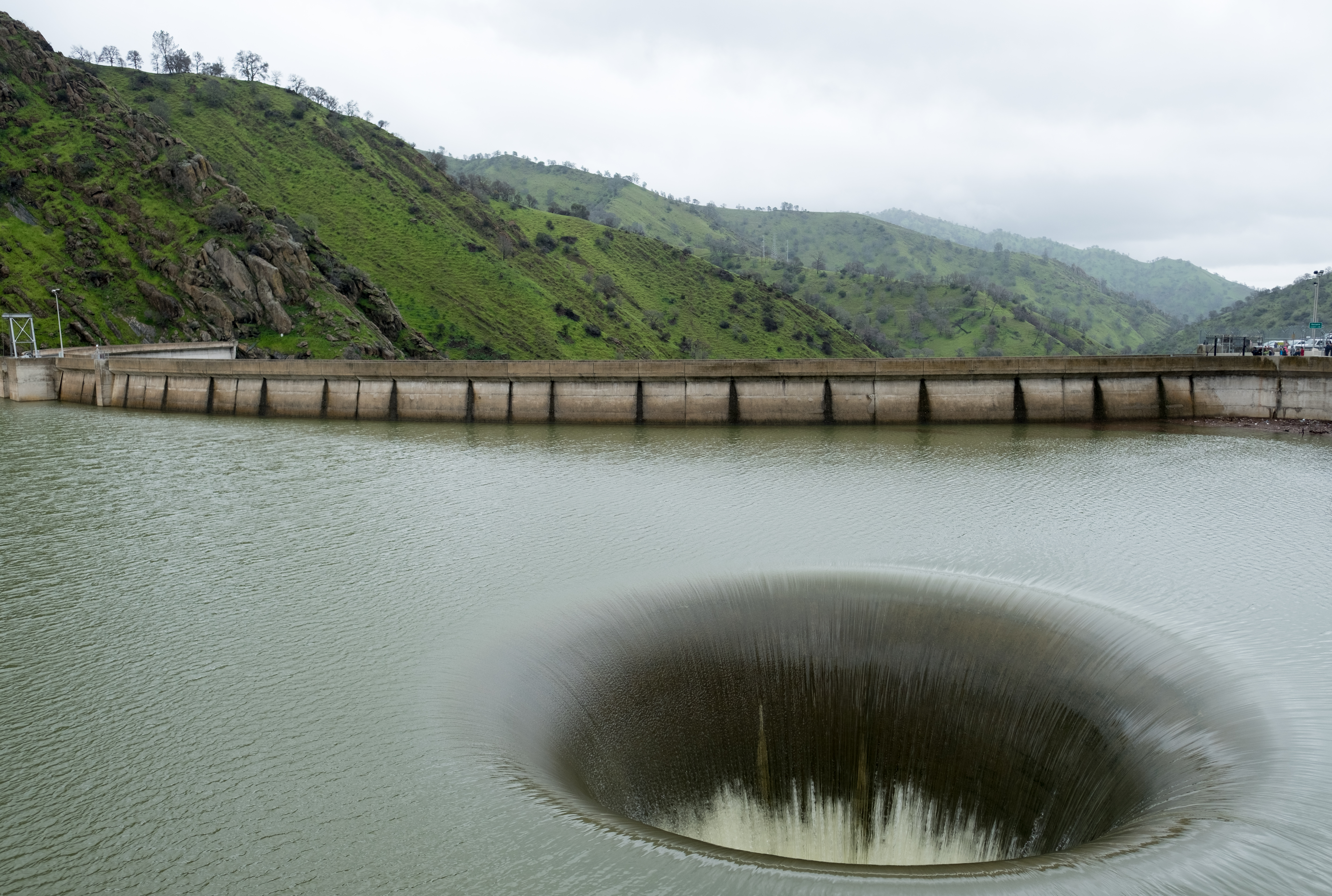
Glory hole at Lake Berryessa in 2017

Lake Berryessa has what is known as a bell-mouth spillway, or "glory hole". These spillways are manmade features and prevent reservoirs from flooding. The United States Bureau of Reclamation (USBR) defines a spillway as a structure that protects the structural integrity of a dam/reservoir.

There are multiple types of spillways such as auxiliary, emergency, service, morning glory, shaft, and fuse plugs. The one present at Lake Berryessa is the "morning glory spillway" - named after its resemblance to the morning glory flower.

The USBR owns and operates this spillway where when water rises over 440 feet above sea level, the lake spills over the morning glory, funnels down the cone and exits into Putah Creek - the other side of the Monticello Dam.

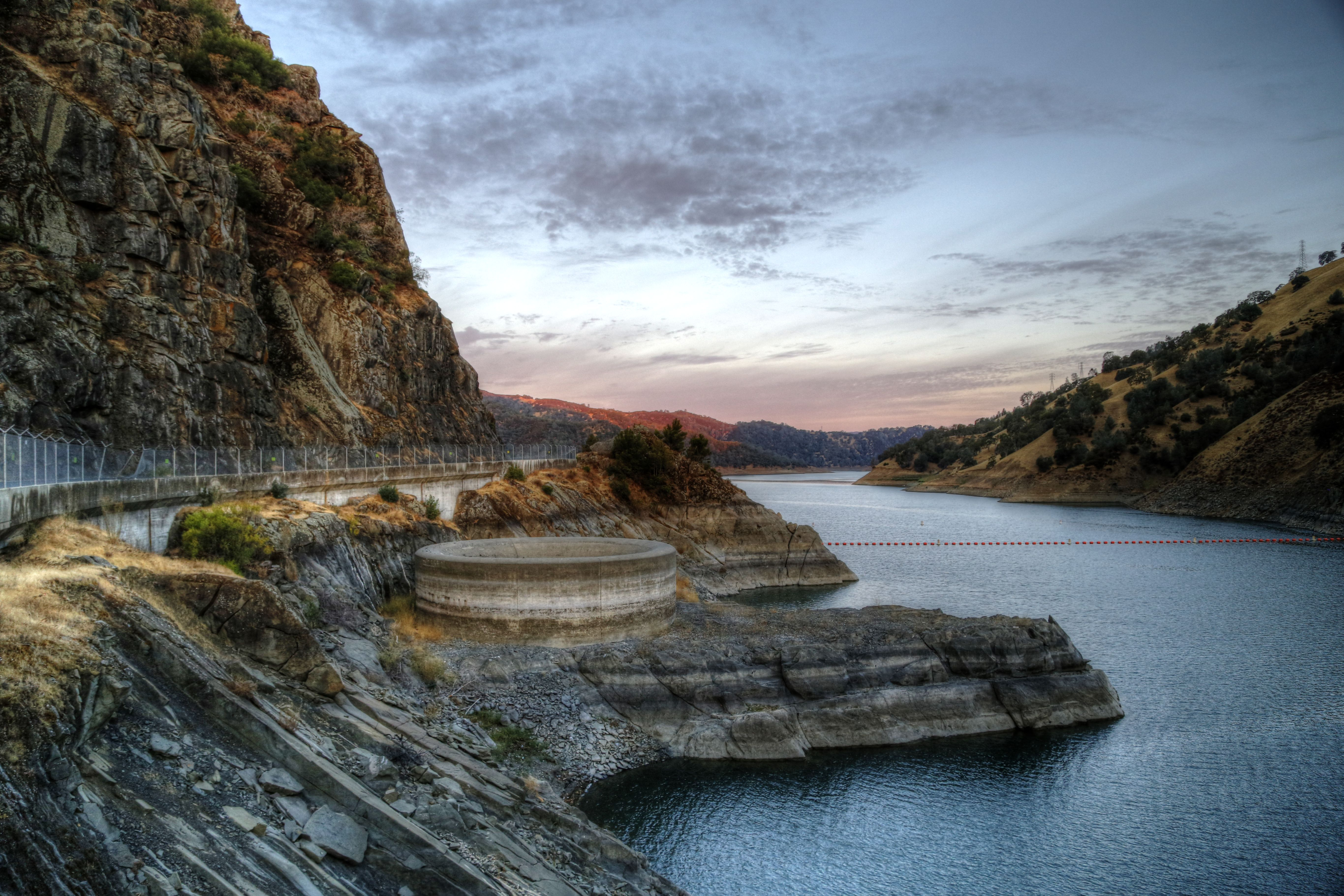
Note the difference in the amount of water needed for this glory hole to look like the known "vortex"

Lake Berryessa can hold about 521 bullion gallons of water before needing the morning glory to prevent floods. Note the difference in the amount of water present in different times of water supply. The first picture to the left was taken in 2017, whereas there is absolutely no activity or even water.

== Effects of drought ==
As of March 2022, Solano County was in Exceptional Drought. Some effects of an exceptional drought are: fields are left fallow, orchards are removed; vegetable yields are low; honey harvest is small, fire season is very costly; number of fires and area burned are extensive, and fish rescue and relocation begins, pine beetle infestation occurs forest mortality is high; wetlands dry up; survival of native plants and animals is low; fewer wildflowers bloom; wildlife death is widespread; and algae blooms appear.

The SCWA states that while local water utilities expect them to be able to meet water needs this year, everyone must still do their part to conserve water and stretch the water supply as the drought might continue throughout 2022.

== Water Management Plans ==
In 2019, the SCWA released a 5-year Water Management Plan in 2017. The update from June 2019 discusses projections and what will occur when the state inevitably experiences water shortages. There is a two-stage trigger for contingency actions. Stage 1 conditions where there is a 25% reduction of water in the SWP and/or the Solano Project will result in securing additional water supplies from outside sources such as drought water banks or joint efforts with other water agencies. Stage 2 conditions where there is a 50% reduction of water in SWP and/or the Solano Project will incur the same actions taken in Stage 1 and also state the willingness to consider allocations of shortages in the SWP supply as specified in the member agency agreements.

The SCWA's water management plan for 2022 has yet to be released to the California Department of Water Resources. However, as the state's drought conditions worsen, the need for Water Management Plans become more and more of a necessity. As of 2022, East Bay Municipal Utilities District, or EBMUD, (another local water utility district) is considering the implementation of mandatory caps on household water usage, where those who exceed that cap must pay a fine.
