= Los Banos Grandes =

The Los Banos Grandes reservoir was first proposed in 1983 and would have served a similar purpose to Sites Reservoir. The 1.73 million acre-feet (2.13 km^{3}) reservoir would have been located along the California Aqueduct several miles south of San Luis Reservoir, and would have allowed for the storage of water during wet years when extra water could be pumped from the Sacramento–San Joaquin Delta. Pumped-storage hydroelectric plants would have been built between Los Banos Grandes and the existing Los Banos flood control reservoir, and between that reservoir and the aqueduct. The current status of Los Banos Grandes remains uncertain, as the DWR has been unable to appropriate funding since the 1990s.

== See also ==
- California State Water Project
- Water in California
