= Peripheral Canal =

The Peripheral Canal was a series of proposals starting in the 1940s to divert water from California's Sacramento River, around the periphery of the San Joaquin-Sacramento River Delta, to uses farther south. The canal would have attempted to resolve a problem with the quality of water pumped south. Pumps create such a powerful suction that the boundary between freshwater to saltwater has shifted inland, negatively affecting the environment. The pumps have increased by 5 to 7 million acre-feet (6.2 to 8.6 km^{3}) the amount of water exported each year to the Central Valley and Southern California. However, the peripheral canal as proposed would have reduced the overall freshwater flow into the Delta and move the freshwater-saltwater interface further inland, causing damage to Delta agriculture and ecosystems.

== Water project impact ==
Before the Central Valley Project and State Water Project were built, all freshwater—primarily runoff from the Sierra Nevada—entering the Sacramento–San Joaquin River Delta flowed into San Francisco Bay. After the pumps powering the Central Valley Project and State Water Project became operational, the freshwater was drawn from the Delta Cross Channel through a maze of river channels and sloughs before entering the Clifton Court Forebay north of Tracy, where water is pumped into the California Aqueduct and the Delta-Mendota Canal. Large numbers of Delta smelt and other endangered species are killed by the pumping plants, which provide water for the aqueducts. Freshwater flowing into the Delta displaces salt water entering from the San Francisco Bay.

== Sponsors ==
Senator Dianne Feinstein, former California Governor Arnold Schwarzenegger and Governor Jerry Brown supported the Peripheral Canal. However, the Peripheral Canal proposal was criticized because it would further reduce the amount of freshwater flowing through the Delta. Farmers in the Delta are among the most opposed to the project because it would decrease the amount of water available to them for irrigation. On August 28, 2014 the United States Environmental Protection Agency commented that the plan could violate the Clean Water Act and harm endangered fish species.

Before 2015, the Bay Delta Conservation Plan had two coequal goals of habitat restoration and water supply improvement. In April 2015, the habitat restoration plan and the water supply improvement plan were separated. In effect, the 50-year guarantee to restore the Delta's environment has been dropped.

== New proposal ==
As of 2016, a new concept that tries to accomplish the same purpose is under consideration in the form of two massive tunnels to be constructed as part of the $25 billion California Water Fix and Eco Restore project. Governor Jerry Brown strongly advocated for the project, but it was mired in controversy due to problems financing it and environmental concerns.

== Previous proposals ==
Prior to the 1940s, water was drawn from the southern end of the Delta. Since then, various groups have lobbied for the construction of a Peripheral Canal to instead draw water from the Sacramento and San Joaquin rivers to the federal aqueducts. Because of drought and other low flow issues that cause salty ocean water to flow from pumping stations which are located at the southern edge of the Sacramento–San Joaquin River Delta into the aqueducts of both the state (California Aqueduct) and federal government (Delta-Mendota Canal), aquatic environments as well as water for drinking and irrigation are contaminated. Thus, both state and federal agencies proposed a plan in 1965 for the second phase of the California State Water Project, which created a canal that would transport fresh water from the Sacramento River bypassing the delta, instead of through it.

Voters defeated a ballot initiative to build a similar Canal in 1982.

== See also ==
- Delta Conveyance Project, the successor to the Peripheral Canal proposal
