= Ah Pah Dam =

Coordinates: 41.422038°N 123.935909°W

- Approximate extent of the planned reservoir
- Interactive map of Ah Pah Dam
- Country: United States
- Location: Humboldt County, Northern California
- Status: Unbuilt
- Owner: U.S. Bureau of Reclamation

Dam and spillways
- Type of dam: Concrete thick arch
- Impounds: Klamath River
- Height: 813 ft (248 m)
- Length: 3,500 ft (1,100 m)

Reservoir
- Total capacity: 15,000,000 acre⋅ft (19 km^{3})
- Catchment area: 14,700 sq mi (38,000 km^{2})

Power Station
- Installed capacity: 900–1,700 MW

Ah Pah Dam was a proposed dam on the Klamath River in the U.S. state of California proposed by the United States Bureau of Reclamation as part of its United Western Investigation study in 1951. It was to have been 813 feet (248 m) high and was to be located 12 miles (19 km) upstream of the river's mouth. It would have been taller than any existing dam in the United States and it would stand almost as tall as the Transamerica Pyramid building in San Francisco, but would have been much more massive. It would have flooded 40 miles (64 km) of the Trinity River, including the Yurok, Karuk and Hupa Indian Reservations, the lower Salmon River, and 70 miles (110 km) of the Klamath River, creating a reservoir with a volume of 15,000,000 acre-feet (19 km^{3}) – three fifths the size of Lake Mead, and over three times the size of the current largest reservoir in California, Shasta Lake. The water would flow by gravity through a tunnel 60 miles (97 km) long to the Sacramento River just above Redding and onward to Southern California, in an extreme diversion plan known as the Klamath Diversion. The tunnel would have been located near the southernmost extent of the reservoir. It was named in the language of the Yurok people.
