= Delta Conveyance Project =

Proposed water tunnel in California

The Delta Conveyance Project, formerly known as California WaterFix and EcoRestore or the Bay Delta Conservation Plan, is a $20 billion plan proposed by Governor Jerry Brown and the California Department of Water Resources to build a 36 foot (11 m) diameter tunnel to carry fresh water from the Sacramento River southward under the Sacramento-San Joaquin Delta to Bethany Reservoir for use by the State Water Project and the Central Valley Project.

== Project History ==
The precipitation in the northern part of the state has long been diverted by federal and state water projects to the southern portion of the state for agriculture and urban use. In the 1960s, Governor Pat Brown supported two large projects that reallocated water from the northern portion of the state to Southern California. In the early 1980s, his son, Governor Jerry Brown, attempted a third, the Peripheral Canal, which failed to gain voter support. Governor Arnold Schwarzenegger pushed for the project in 2009 and, when Jerry Brown returned to office as governor in January 2011, he made it one of his two main focuses during his eight years in office. During those years, the project morphed from an above-the-ground "peripheral canal" to two huge underground tunnels referred to as the "twin tunnels." The twin tunnel project was finally stopped in 2018 through the work of Delta citizens and support organizations. Governor Gavin Newsom began pushing for a single tunnel project when he took office in 2019.

=== Central Valley Project and State Water Project ===
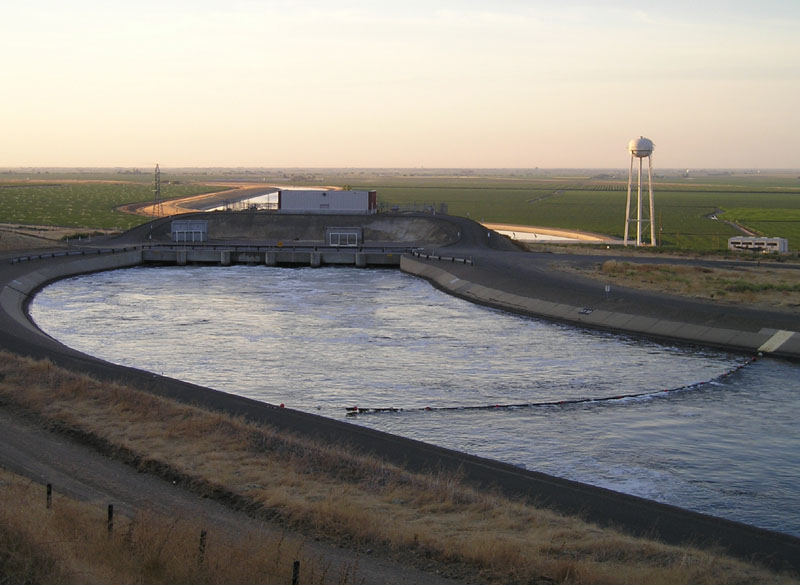
Dos Amigos Pumping Plant on the California Aqueduct

The Central Valley Project (CVP) is a federally owned and operated project completed in the 1970s. It has 600 miles (970 km) of canals and moves up to 13 million acre feet per year and generates electricity—about half of which is used by the system. Overall, depending on the weather and amount of rain, up to 80% of water in the state is used for agriculture. Before the Central Valley Project Improvement Act (CVPIA) in 1992, the water transported from northern California went primarily to agriculture (90%), with the remaining 10% going to urban users. The CVPIA required that 11% of the water go to environmental uses, with agriculture getting 79% of the water and urban users getting 10%.

The State Water Project (SWP) is owned and operated by the State of California and was conceived and supported in the late 1960s by Governor Edmund Pat Brown. The SWP has 700 miles of canals and can move 5.8 million acre feet of water per year. According to the Department of Water Resources website, "the California State Water Project’s average water is 34 percent for agricultural and 66 percent for residential, municipal, and industrial" uses over the past 20 years.

=== Peripheral Canal ===
When Governor Jerry Brown was previously in office, he championed an earlier version of the tunnels project called the Peripheral Canal. It would have transported water from near Sacramento around the Sacramento-San Joaquin Delta into the Central Valley Project and exported it to southern California. It was submitted to the voters for approval as a ballot referendum in 1982 but was turned down.

=== Bay Delta Conservation Plan ===
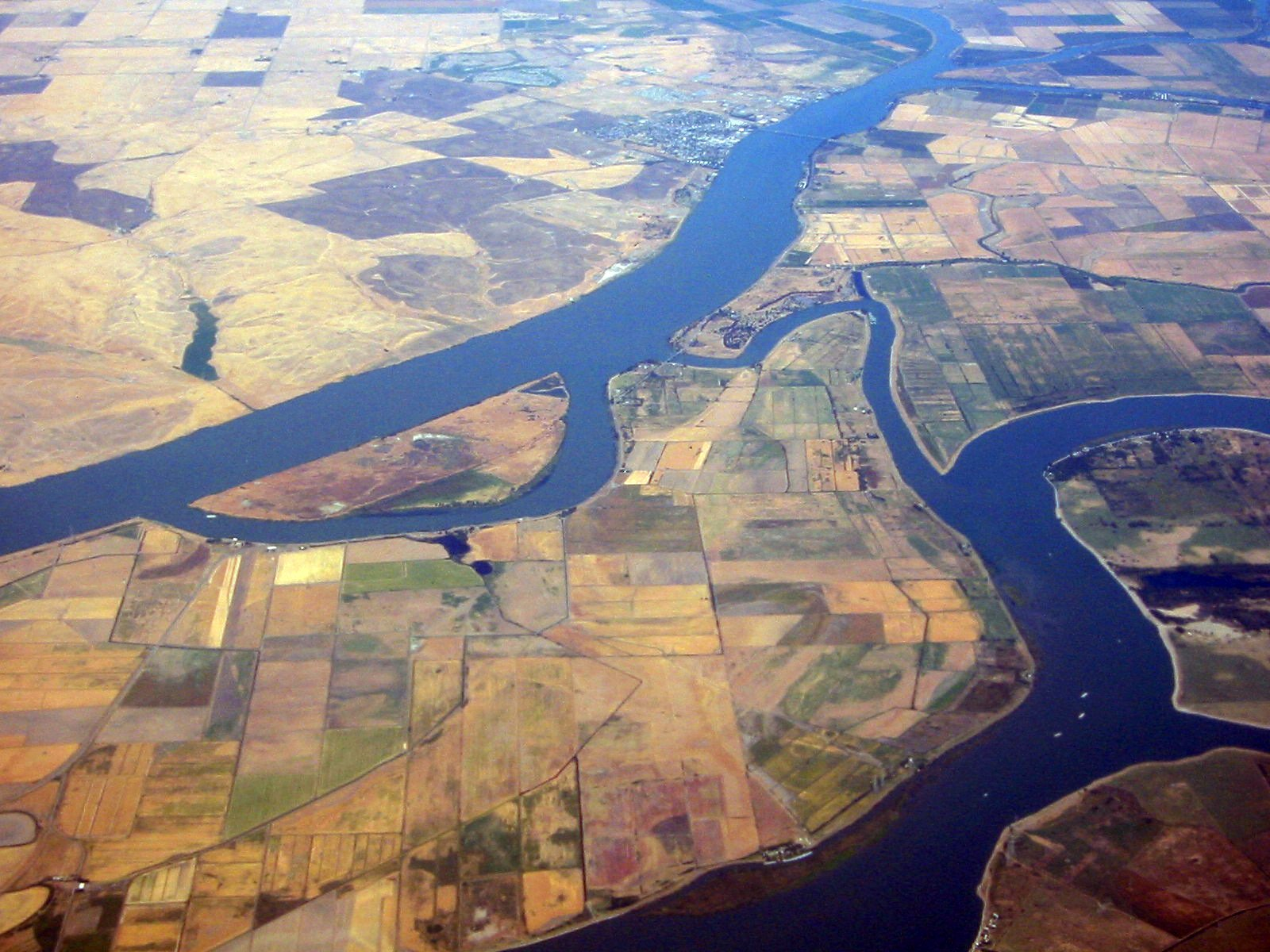
The Delta viewed from above Sherman Island, with the Sacramento River above and San Joaquin River below

The WaterFix and EcoRestore project was previously called the Bay Delta Conservation Plan. When proposed in 2009, the project as originally conceived included both plans for building the tunnels and restoring the delta. The Bay Delta Conservation Plan included restoring 100,000 acres (40,000 ha) over a 50-year span. The US Fish and Wildlife Service said it would not issue permits for the plan because the state could not prove that the habitat restoration project would help the salmon, sturgeon, or delta smelt.

As a result, the Brown administration drastically reduced the habitat restoration plan and separated the water supply improvement plan, renaming it the WaterFix and EcoRestore project. The revised plan proposes short-term permits for each endangered species encountered. The EcoRestore project only attempts to restore 30,000 acres (12,000 ha) over five years at a cost of $300 million, funded with state bond money and other sources.

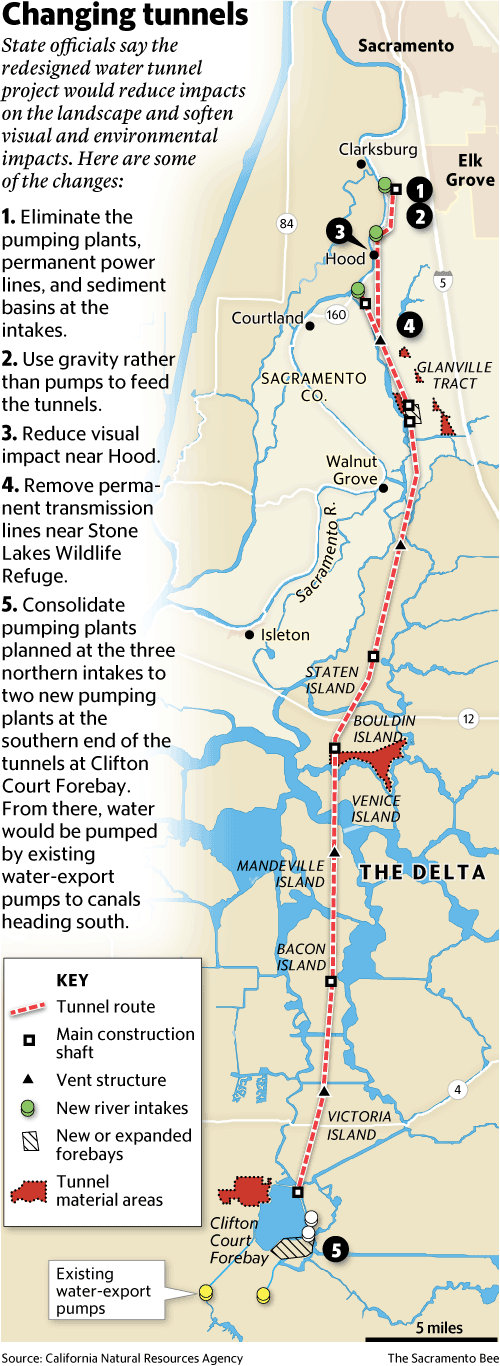
Proposed Delta Tunnels

=== 2015 WaterFix & EcoRestore Proposals ===
The WaterFix project was proposed to address the issues of the water system infrastructure in California being "unreliable and outdated", as well as helping prepare for possible threats to the water system such as climate change and seismic activity.

The WaterFix proposal included two categories of construction: the north tunnels and the main tunnels. The north tunnels were to be three separate tunnels, each about 14 miles long, which would connect the three intake facilities to the Intermediate Forebay (IF). The main tunnels were intended to connect the Intermediate Forebay to the Clifton Court Forebay. These twin tunnels, depicted in the adjacent image, would be about 30 miles long. The main tunnels were also known as the twin tunnels, but with a different design from the Peripheral Canals proposed in 1982. Each tunnel would be 150 feet (46 m) below ground, 40 feet (12 m) in diameter and 30 miles (48 km) in length. The project proposed three new intakes with a capacity of 9000 cubic feet per second (approx. 255 kilolitres per second) each, and a total annual yield of 4.9 million acre-feet. The project was to be funded by revenue bonds created by the water agencies and paid by the farmers and urban water users, thus not requiring legislative or voter approval.

According to the California Water Board, "In April 2015, DWR and Reclamation announced plans to split the project into two separate efforts; one for water conveyance facilities and the other for habitat restoration." California WaterFix was the conveyance project, and EcoRestore was the habitat restoration project. The planned EcoRestore would have included upwards of 30,000 acres (12,000 ha) for restoration; 1,000 acres (400 ha) for upland and habitat protection linked to flood protection, 3,500 acres (1,400 ha) for wetland restoration, 9,000 acres (3,600 ha) for tidal and sub tidal zones, and the last 17,500 acres (7,100 ha) will be permitted for floodplain restoration.

In May 2019, the Department of Water Resources withdrew the proposed permits for the WaterFix project, conducted a new environmental review, and began the planning processes for a significantly smaller singular tunnel project that would replace the WaterFix project.

=== Delta Conveyance Project ===
In 2022, the project was renamed to the Delta Conveyance Project. It proposed a tunnel that would take water from the Sacramento River to Bethany Reservoir, then to the California Aqueduct. The 2022 plan was scaled-down from earlier proposals, and consists of a single concrete tunnel with a diameter of 36 feet (11 m), built 140 to 170 feet (43 to 52 m) underground. On December 21, 2023, the project was approved by the California Department of Water Resources. The approval was denounced by Congressman Josh Harder, who called it a "disastrous water grab to steal our Valley water." Local Delta organizations, including the Delta Counties Coalition and the Delta Tribal Environmental Coalition, have opposed the construction of the tunnel on environmental, cultural, and economic grounds.

== Litigation ==
In January 2024, San Francisco Baykeeper, California Indian Environmental Alliance, Golden State Salmon Association, The Bay Institute, Restore the Delta, and the Shingle Springs Band of Miwok Indians filed litigation against the Delta Conveyance Project. In the lawsuit, the groups assert that the California Department of Water Resources violated the California Environmental Quality Act (CEQA) by failing to address numerous negative effects the project would have on fish populations, other wildlife, and Native American Tribes.

A second lawsuit was also filed against the project by the Center for Biological Diversity, Sierra Club, and California Sportfishing Protection Alliance.

== Delta islands purchase ==
The Metropolitan Water District of Southern California bought four delta islands for $175 million in 2016, to include in the state's planned tunnel water project. The purchase of delta islands was challenged by many organizations (including San Joaquin, North Coast Rivers Alliance, Pacific Coast Federation of Fishermen's Association), but a district court decided that it was legal for the water district to purchase these islands because there were no negative impacts of their purchase. The Delta Conveyance Project has since been rerouted and no longer involves the islands, which are instead being restored with wetlands in the Delta Islands Adaptation Project.
