= North Bay Aqueduct =

Aqueduct in northern California, US

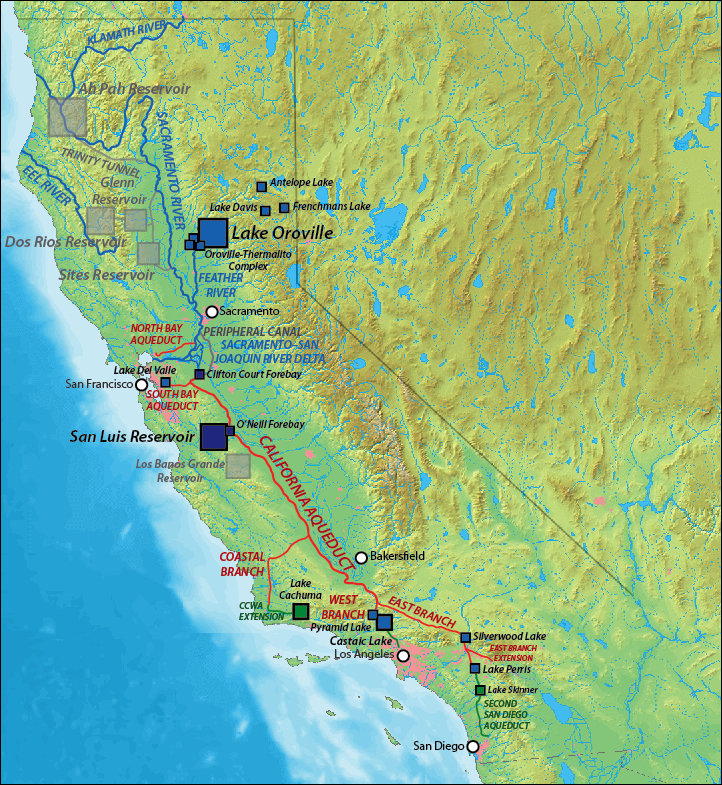
California State Water Project

The North Bay Aqueduct (NBA) is part of the California State Water Project that was built in two phases, Phase I (1967-1968) and Phase II (1985-1988). The aqueduct is 27.4 miles (44.1 km) long all in pipelines and serves Napa and Solano counties, California. The aqueduct provides water to about 500,000 residents in Solano and Napa.

The State Water Project diverts water originating from the Sacramento and San Joaquin Rivers (and their tributaries), and it stores water in Lake Oroville. The North Bay Aqueduct was envisioned as part of the State Water Project during the 1950s and 1960s when the project was being planned. Initial North Bay Aqueduct water service went to Benicia and Vallejo. In 1990, the North Bay Regional Water Treatment Plant, serving Fairfield and Vacaville, came online and was able to treat water from the North Bay Aqueduct for these two cities. The aqueduct cost approximately $83 million to construct.

The North Bay Aqueduct is an underground pipeline that runs from Barker Slough in the Sacramento-San Joaquin River Delta to Cordelia Forebay, just outside Vallejo. From the Cordelia Forebay water is pumped to Napa County, Vallejo and Benicia. Travis Air Force Base is also served by the NBA. It is an enclosed pipeline between Barker Slough and Cordelia Forebay. The size of the underground pipeline varies from 72 inches at Barker Slough to 54 inches at Cordelia Forebay. The NBA is operated remotely by the State Department of Water Resources (DWR) at the Delta Field Division office near Tracy.

The aqueduct cannot deliver the full 175 cfs flow it was designed and contracted for. Pumping tests have shown that it can deliver a maximum of 142 cfs. DWR, Solano County Water Agency (SCWA), and Napa County are investigating methods to increase the capacity of the NBA at least to the contract amount of 175 cfs. Peak pumping occurs during the summer between 50-125 cfs, while during the winters rates are between 0-49 cfs. The North Bay Aqueduct has been used to meet salinity objectives in the western Suisun Marsh by pumping water at Barker Slough and releasing it into Green Valley Creek, and the flow is effective in lowering salinity.

There are restrictions on pumping in order to protect the Delta smelt and longfin smelt. Restoration efforts are conducted in order to protect endangered fish species.

== North Bay Aqueduct Pipeline ==
The North Bay Aqueduct diverts this water from Barker Slough, in the Delta, to the Solano agencies for water supply. Other local sloughs and local drainage in the area can contribute water to the North Bay Aqueduct. The major State Water Project facilities that deliver water to the North Bay Aqueduct include:

- Barker Slough Pumping Plant, which pumps water from Barker Slough into the NBA;
- North Bay Aqueduct, a pipeline that delivers water from Barker Slough to Cordelia Forebay; and
- Cordelia Forebay, where water is pumped to Napa County, Vallejo, and Benicia.

=== Barker Slough Pumping Plant ===
The beginning of the North Bay Aqueduct starts at Barker Slough Pumping Plan, which is located at the northwest end of the Sacramento-San Joaquin Delta. This plant pumps water into the Travis Surge Tank and flows into the Cordelia Pumping Plant. The construction of this plant started on 1986, and the plant was completed in 1988. The slough receives its water from the Sacramento River.

=== Cordelia Forebay ===
The Cordelia Pumping Plant is located in Solano County. The plant has three separate discharge pipelines that delivers water from Barker Slough to Napa County, Vallejo, and Benicia. The pipeline was built between 1986 and 1988, and the plant was built on 1986 and was completed on 1987.

=== Napa Turnout Reservoir ===
Napa Turnout Reservoir can be found in Eastern Napa County and is the western terminus of North Bay Aqueduct. The reservoir connects to Cordelia Surge Tank and was built in 1967 and completed in 1968, and the Napa Turnout Reservoir provides water to the Napa County Flood Control and Water Conservation District.

== Water Quality ==
Some issues with the North Bay Aqueduct are that the water quality of the water being pumped has high amounts of organic carbon and turbidity. Based on a water quality survey conducted in 2016, concentrations of organic carbon ranged from 1.3 to 43 mg/L, and the average concentration at Baker Slough was 6.8 mg/L. Organic carbon reactions with disinfectant chemicals that can form byproducts that are associated with cancer.

Trends of the water survey shows that during wet seasons, total organic carbon (TOC) are higher during wet seasons, and levels highest during winter and early spring months. Levels of turbidity is influenced by the run-off from Baker Slough and is highest at the end of winter seasons. Challenges with high turbidity causes water treatments to use more chemicals to break down turbidity.

Solano County Water Agency has a plan to move the "intake to the North Bay Aqueduct from Cache Slough to the Sacramento River" and this would help to improve water quality, drinking water, improve the Delta, and meet the needs of Solano and Napa counties. This is an attempt to address the water issues of the North Bay Aqueduct and water issues that Solano County faces.

== Water Agencies ==
=== Solano County Water Agency ===
Maximum Annual Entitlement 29,025 acre-feet (35,802,000 m^{3}). The SCWA is a water agency that oversees water management and flood management to Solano County. It was formed in 1951 by Act of State Legislature, and it consists of five members of the Board of Supervisors, mayors of all seven cities within Solano County, and a board member from each of the three agricultural irrigation districts. With this water agency, their main focus is water and flood control, but they also ensure to protect water rights and operations for the county. They also perform habitat water conservation.

Water sheds and storage that they oversee are North Bay Aqueduct, Solano Project, and Putah Creek. These are the water supply for Solano County.

=== Napa County Flood Control and Water Conservation District ===
Maximum Annual Entitlement 47,756 acre-feet (58,906,000 m^{3}).

This water agency oversees water management and flood management for Napa County. It consists of 11 elected officials on their Board: 5 from Napa County Supervisors, and 6 mayors from each city within the county.

They have programs to help with their water and flood management. Some programs include: Napa River and Creek Flood Project, Watershed Management and Stream Maintenance, Storm Water Management, Water Resources, and Groundwater Resources.
