= Castac (disambiguation) =

Castac or Castaic is an unincorporated, rural community near the city of Santa Clarita in Southern California. It can also refer to:

- Rancho Castac — a former land-grant surrounding Lebec, California long since absorbed into Tejon Ranch.
- Castac Lake — a small, seasonal lake on Tejon Ranch.
- Castaic Lake — a big, man-made recreational lake in Castaic, California holding aqueduct water.
- Castaic Dam — a big dam on Castaic Creek forming Castaic Lake from aqueduct water.
- Castaic Creek — a 25-mile-long (40 km) creek running through Castaic, California and trailhead to Indian camp Kashtiq.
- Castaic Power Plant — a hydroelectric power-plant on the Elderberry Forebay of Castaic Lake.
- Castaic Lake State Recreation Area — land in the Angeles National Forest around Castaic Lake.
- Castaic Junction, California — site of the former ranch-house of Rancho San Francisco, crossroads of Highway 126 and The Old Road, and site of a former railroad depot.
- Casteca Lakes — a group of small, seasonal lakes formerly in the bed now filled by artificial Quail Lake.
