= Elderberry Forebay =

Reservoir in Los Angeles County, California

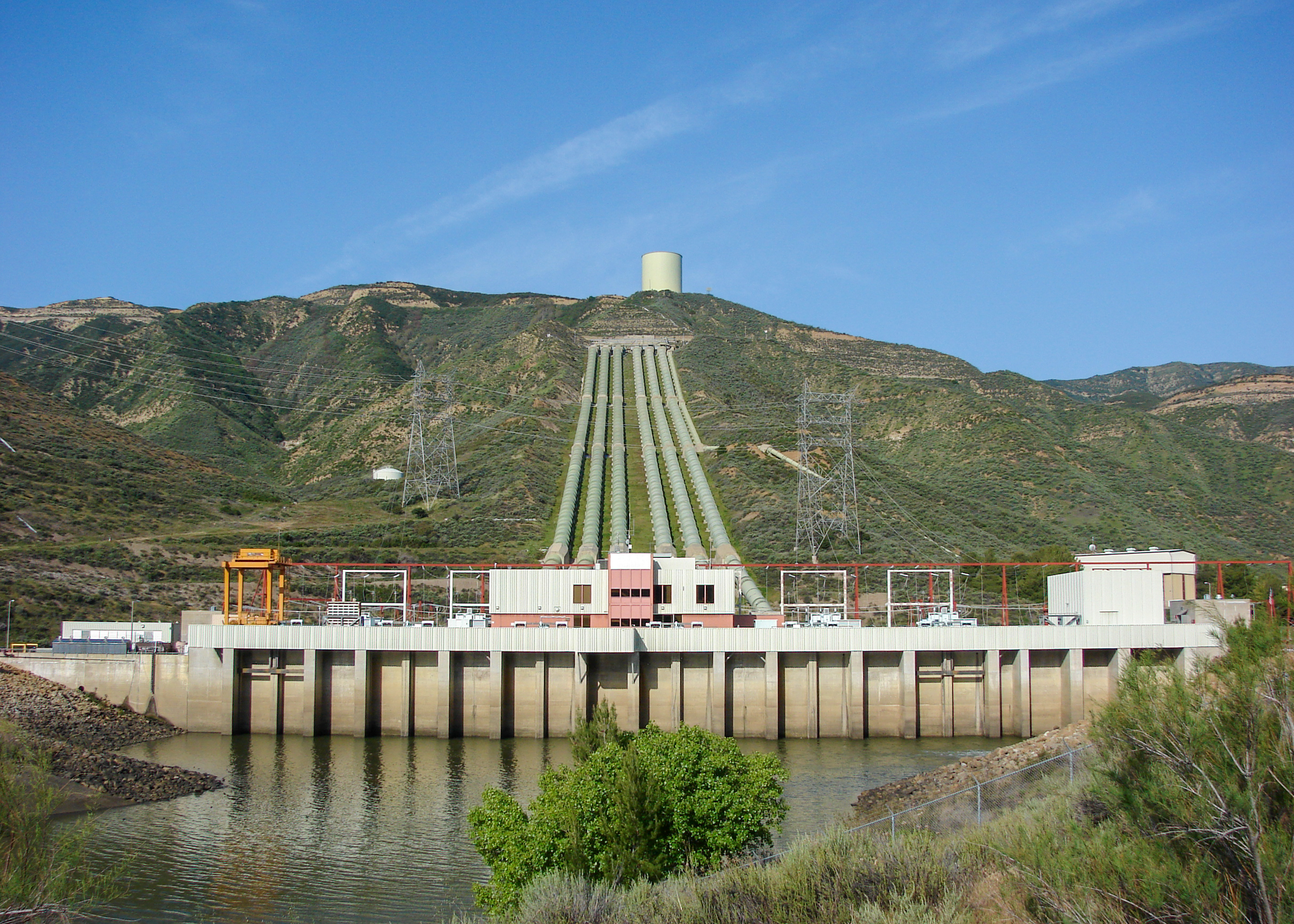

- Location within California
- Location: Los Angeles County, California
- Coordinates: 34.5719°N 118.6379°W
- Type: Reservoir
- Primary inflows: West Branch California Aqueduct
- Primary outflows: Castaic Creek
- Catchment area: 81.6 square miles (211 km^{2})
- Basin countries: United States
- Surface area: 450 acres (180 ha)
- Water volume: 28,400 acre⋅ft (35.0×10^{6} m^{3})
- Surface elevation: 1,519 feet (463 m)

Elderberry Forebay is a small reservoir in Los Angeles County, California, which serves as the pumping forebay of the Castaic Power Plant. It located at the upper end of the larger Castaic Lake and is separated from the lake by Elderberry Forebay Dam at its southern edge. Entering the northern end of the forebay is the west branch of the California Aqueduct, which connects the forebay to Pyramid Lake through the Angeles Tunnel.

A component of the California State Water Project, the reservoir was partitioned from Castaic Lake in 1974 to store water for pumped-storage hydroelectricity generation. During on-peak energy-demand hours, water flows 7.5 miles (12.1 km) from Pyramid Lake through the Angeles Tunnel and then on to the turbines of the Castaic Power Plant, producing electricity. From there, the water flows into Elderberry Forebay. During off-peak hours (including nighttime and Sundays), water is pumped from the forebay, back through the tunnel and into Pyramid Lake.

== See also ==
- California State Water Project
- California Aqueduct
- Castaic Power Plant
