= Castaic Range War =

Range war in Castaic, California, United States

- Part of the Range Wars
- Date: 1890–1916
- Location: Castaic, California
- Caused by: Land disputes, family feud

Parties
William Willoby Jenkins	William C. Chormicle

Casualties and losses
- 21–40 killed

The Castaic Range War, also known as the Jenkins-Chormicle Affair, was a range war that happened in Castaic, California from 1890 to 1916, between ranchers and farmers William Willoby Jenkins and William C. Chormicle who both staked claims on a piece of land in the territory. The feud started when Chormicle purchased 1,600 acres of the same land Jenkins had settled on years ago. When the dispute couldn't be settled in court, violence erupted between the two, lasting for over two decades, with dozens of men from both sides killed. It was one of the largest range wars in American history and one of the bloodiest events in the state.

== History ==
=== Background ===
William Willoby Jenkins was a rancher and gambler who staked a claim of land in Castaic, California in 1875, during the great migration in the West following the Homestead Acts of the late 19th century. He was 16 when he moved from Ohio to the Los Angeles area with his family in 1851.

In Castaic, Jenkins ran a successful ranch, an oil company, and a profitable cat business during a rat infestation in the county. He later developed a reputation as a gambler and gunman. At one time Jenkins was deputized as a Los Angeles County constable.

In one incident, he was sent to repossess a guitar from a locally popular Mexican man named Antonio Ruiz. A fight broke out during which Jenkins shot and killed Ruiz. Jenkins was jailed to await trial for murder. A mob of about 200 Mexicans formed to lynch him and the sheriff was wounded during their failed attempt to swarm the jail.

Jenkins later enlisted in the Los Angeles Rangers, a local militia. The group pursued the men who had shot the sheriff and arrested their leader, but later released him. By 1872, Jenkins had staked a claim near Castaic Creek, building a ranch he called the Lazy Z.

=== Feud ===
In 1890, another rancher and frontiersman by the name of William C. Chormicle settled nearby, claiming to have bought 1,600 acres of the same land as Jenkins from railroads. This claim conflicted with that by Jenkins and the two came into conflict. The men failed to resolve the dispute amicably in court and it escalated to violence. The same year, Jenkins sent three men onto the disputed land. Chormicle and William A. Gardner, a friend of his, fired on the intruders, killing two of them, while the third escaped by horse. Chormicle and Gardner surrendered to the sheriff and a trial was set. They pleaded self-defense, saying that they were protecting the property. The trial lasted for 18 days in June 1890, one of the longest trials in Los Angeles County history at the time. Jenkins was infuriated when the jury found Chormicle and Gardner not guilty.

The two men began to dispute mining, grazing, and water rights in addition to road building. A number of barns were burned on both sides, and men were killed in gun battles. In one incident, a young girl was killed in a crossfire. Later, forest ranger Robert Emmett Clark, appointed in 1905 by President Theodore Roosevelt, was sent to end the feud. Clark succeeded in keeping the peace until 1913, when he left Castaic. That year, Jenkins was shot in the chest at his Lazy Z home by a man working for Chormicle, but survived. The feud continued, and a group of men working for Jenkins burned down William Gardner's house, killing him and some members of his family. Chormicle retaliated by having his rival's son, David Jenkins, lynched in Bouquet Canyon.

On March 8, 1913, Jenkins was shot while herding cattle off the disputed land by a man named William Lewis "Billy" Rose, who also claimed some of the same land as Jenkins and who was an ally of Chormicle. Jenkins again survived, and the feud drew to a close. Rose pleaded self-defense as Jenkins was a known gunfighter. Jenkins eventually died of an illness in October 1916 while visiting relatives in Los Angeles. He was either 84 or 86, and had reportedly survived a total of seven gunshot wounds. Chormicle died of chronic kidney disease on March 25, 1919.

In total, the Castaic Range War claimed the lives of 21 to 40 people.

== Legacy ==
Today, much of the disputed land, near what is now the intersection of Lake Hughes Road and Castaic Road, is submerged under Castaic Lake behind Castaic Dam. In 1998, workers at a housing development site unearthed the pine boxes containing the remains of an infant and four adult men. The site was believed to have been the site of the Jenkins family cemetery and the bodies believed to be some of the final victims of the range war. Bouquet Canyon, where William Jenkins's son David was killed, has been nicknamed both "Hangman's Canyon" or "Dead Man's Canyon", in reference to the lynching.
