= Pyramid Dam =

Embankment dam impounding Piru Creek in Los Angeles County, California, United States

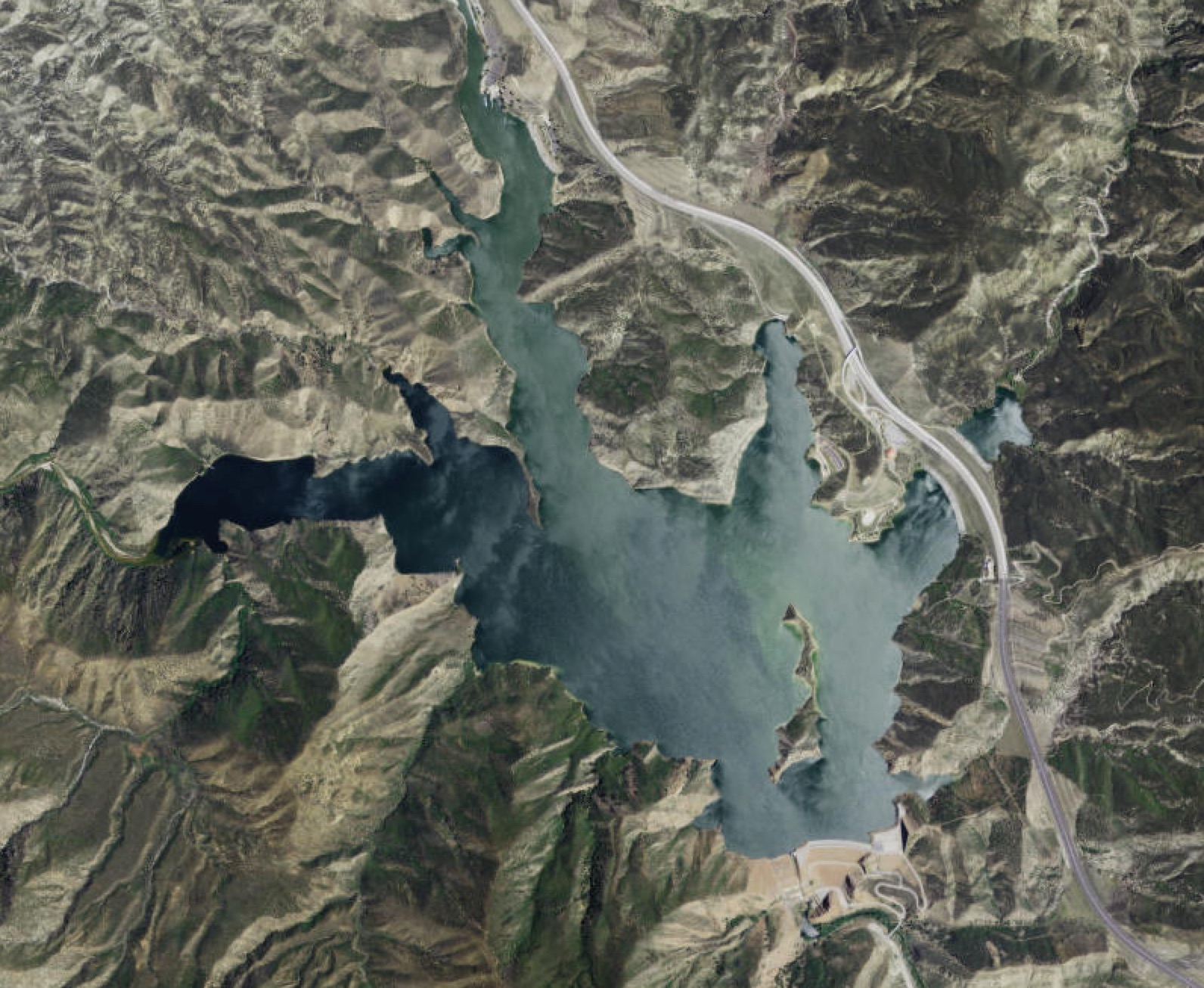
- Satellite view of dam and reservoir. Interstate 5 is on the right of the image.
- Interactive map of Pyramid Dam
- Country: United States
- Location: Los Angeles County, California
- Coordinates: 34°38′39″N 118°45′50″W
- Construction began: 1968; 58 years ago
- Opening date: 1970; 56 years ago

Dam and spillways
- Type of dam: Embankment
- Height: 386 ft (118 m)
- Length: 1,080 ft (330 m)
- Spillway type: Gated concrete chute

Reservoir
- Creates: Pyramid Lake
- Total capacity: 180,000 acre⋅ft (220,000,000 m^{3})
- Catchment area: 293 mi^{2} (760 km^{2})
- Surface area: 1,297 acres (525 ha)

Pyramid Dam is a dam on Piru Creek in northern Los Angeles County, California, north of Castaic and south of Gorman. Its reservoir, Pyramid Lake, stores water from the West Branch of the California Aqueduct for Ventura and Los Angeles Counties. They are smaller than Castaic Dam and Lake, the other artificial water storage facility in the area, 7 miles (11 km) to the south.

== Funding and construction ==
Construction of the dam was made possible by California voter approval in 1960 of the California Aqueduct project, also referred to as the Feather River project (the source of the water in the northern part of the state north of Auburn). State bonds were issued to finance the project. Pyramid Dam, which first began construction in 1968, is 386 feet (118 m) high. It lies directly behind the mountain rock, giving the dam and lake its name – Pyramid Cut – which before the Ridge Route Alternate (later signed as U.S. Route 99) was built through the area in the 1931 to 1933 time period, was just another ordinary mountain. The highway construction of the Ridge Route Alternate caused this mountain to have part of its mass "shaved" off – reduced in size – and after the work to accommodate highway traffic was finished, the shape of the cut was found to resemble a pyramid, and hence the name.

== Statistics ==
Pyramid Dam holds 171,196 acre-feet (211,167,000 m^{3}) of water, covering an area of 1,297 acres (525 ha). Its maximum capacity is 180,000 acre-feet (220,000,000 m^{3}). The lake behind the dam, shaped like a Triceratops tooth, has been used for boating, swimming, and camping since 1974. The dam and lake were built by the state of California Department of Water Resources (DWR), which maintains them today. The water stored there serves residents, businesses, and farmers in Ventura and Los Angeles Counties.

== US 99 ==
During the construction of Pyramid Dam, US 99 vehicle traffic was rerouted to Interstate 5 beginning in 1968. In the 1968–9 time period, motorists could still drive US 99 from Violin Summit to Hungry Valley Road (since renamed Smokey Bear Road). After completion of the dam in 1970, Feather River water began to fill the area behind the dam, a plan conceived of even before the construction of the Ridge Route Alternate. By 1972, the Ridge Route Alternate was fully submerged under the lake's water. Since then, its northern border with the lake continues to serve as a boat ramp. The lake's southern border portion of US 99 is closed to motorists.

== See also ==
- List of dams and reservoirs in California
- List of the tallest dams in the United States
