= Córdova family of California =

The Córdova family is a noted Californio family of Southern California. The family were the first settlers in the area near present-day Castaic, California and played a notable role in 19th century Sierra Pelona.

== Jesús Córdova ==
The progenitor of the family line, Jesús Córdova, was born in Mátasan, Sonora (Mexico). Jesús immigrated to California and worked as a vaquero (cowboy) for the priests at Mission San Fernando. after it was secularized in 1834 by the Mexican government.

== First settlers ==
The Córdova family may have homesteaded in Castaic, California as early as 1834. The Cordova family were the first settlers in the Castaic area and have maintained an unbroken presence through successive generations.

== Land grant ==
In 1835, Jesús Córdova received a Mexican Land Grant of 1,040 acres in Castaic Canyon.

== Location ==
The U.S. Geological Survey (USGS) published a map in 1937 that shows the precise location of the now historic Cordova ranch house.

Latitude: 34° 34' 20.96" North (34.5724896)

Longitude: 118° 38' 1.32" West (−118.6336991)

== Place in history ==
Jesús Córdova was the "Indian" vaquero who guided John C. Frémont over Tehachapi Pass in 1844 during one of Frémont's famous expeditions that mapped the Western frontier. Known as "the pathfinder", Frémont's explorations encouraged Americans to migrate and settle in the west.

Jesús Córdova also acted as a scout for the U.S. Army during the Mexican–American War in 1846.

Jesús Córdova later worked for Frémont's scout, Alexis Godey, who had acted as guide for John C. Frémont's expedition through the Kern County area in 1843–44. Alexis Godey had met Jesús Córdova while Frémont was camped on Caliente Creek, and meet him again in 1850.

Godey asked Córdova about vacant lands in the area, and Córdova showed Godey the Cuyama No. 2 Land Grant (later the Russell Ranch). With the cession of California to the United States following the Mexican–American War, the 1848 Treaty of Guadalupe Hidalgo provided that existing land grants would be honored. The Cuyama section had been granted in 1842 but was in dispute by 1852. Alexis Godey squatted on the land and Jesús Córdova went to work for him as his majordomo.

It took over 20 years for the Lataillade heirs to establish title to the land grant during which time Alexis Godey had built an adobe house and was running large herds of cattle. When the title was finally resolved in 1879, Alexis Godey was forced to vacate the property.

== Tejon Ranch ==
Jesús and María Antonia Córdova left Cuyama to live and work on the Tejon Ranch. Jesús Córdova may have worked on the Tejon Ranch as early as September 1855 (when he was named in a documents as a witness to the sale of livestock).

== Marriage ==
In 1869, the Reverend William Coll married Jesús Córdova and Native American, María Antonia ("Chata") Lugo-Arriola, at "En el Lugar del Rio Bravo" ("In the Place of the Rio Bravo", now the Kern River) [Marriage No. 1025]. They had nine sons and three daughters all of whom lived to adulthood. Their sons were all vaqueros or cowboys like their father. All the sons remained lifelong bachelors except for Marcos Patrick Cordova (1866–1948) who married and had children. Their children were to carry on the Córdova patriarchal bloodline.

== Second generation ==
Jesús and María Antonia's children included:

1. Victor Cordova (c.1854 – 27 December 1929).
2. Toribio ("Toby") Cordova (31 January 1860 – 20 January 1939).
3. Miguel Cordova born c.1862
4. Marcos Cordova born on Tejon Ranch (20 July 1866 – 31 July 1948).
5. Simon Cordova (c.1867 – 1 January 1934).
6. Virginia Cordova (born c.1870). Married John Baptiste Olme on 26 September 1889 – separated in 1891.
7. Anastacia Cordova (15 April 1872 – 9 October 1922)
8. Aurelio Cordova (8 February 1880 – 12 December 1950).

Several family members from this generation were buried in the Ruiz-Perea Family Cemetery in San Francisquito Canyon.

== Eyewitness ==
There is an unconfirmed story that Benjamin Franklin Bragg narrowly escaped with his life after an outlaw known as Bronco Charlie Riley shot four of Bragg's mine workers in Bear Canyon in 1878. The Cordova family had something to add to this story...

Recalling a conversation with Rosa Pauline Cordova that took place at the Cordova ranch in early 1950, David Wasdahl remembers: "The Cordovas had the ranch next to ours and they were probably the best source of Castaic-area history. I remember Mrs. Cordova, the matriarch mother, telling me about Doc Bragg riding, hell-for-leather, down the canyon screaming that Bronco Charlie had killed everyone at the mine."

Rosa Cordova was too young to witness this event herself, so this story was passed down from first- or second-generation family members.

== Castaic Range War ==
Rosa Pauline Cordova testified on behalf of William Louis Rose (aka "Billy Rose") during his trial for the non-fatal shooting of William Willoby ("Wirt") Jenkins in a shoot out in Castaic Canyon on 8 March 1913 during the long-running Castaic Range War (1890 to 1916).

== Son marries ==
On 5 April 1903, Marcos Cordova married Rosa Pauline Moore (July 1887 – July 1957) in the Pardee House in Newhall, CA. The bride Rosa Moore was born in California in 1887 and was of mixed Native American and European ancestry. Rosa was around age 16 at the time of her marriage to Marcos.

== Third generation ==
Marcos and Rosa Cordova had a total of 18 children with 13 living into adulthood, seven sons and six daughters. The children were all born at the Cordova ranch house in Castaic Canyon.

1. Frances J. Villa (née Cordova) (3 December 1906 – 15 August 1971) (age 64)
2. Beatrice Antonia Chacanaca (née Cordova) (1910–1986)
3. Victoria Ybarra (née Cordova) (1910–1997)
4. Ignacio J. Cordova (31 July 1908 – 26 July 1953) (age 44)
5. Rose Fern LeBrun (née Cordova) 30 May 1914 – 28 July 2004 (age 90)
6. Mary Lou Masterson (née Cordova) (1916–1996)
7. Patrick M. Cordova (17 March 1917 – 6 July 1961) (age 44)
8. Michael Cordova (5 July 1918 – 18 August 1996) (age 79)
9. William Cordova (5 January 1920 – 21 October 2003) (age 83)
10. Margaret Everest Heltzel (née Cordova) 26 October 1921 – 16 June 1993 (age 71)
11. John Cordova (13 June 1923 – 18 June 1945) (age 22)
12. Lawrence Cordova (10 December 1926 – 29 January 2004) (age 77)
13. Rudolph E. Cordova (12 May 1928 – 8 December 2012) (age 84)

== Military service ==
Four of the sons were drafted and served in WWII.....(1) Patrick, (2) Michael, (3) John ("Johnny"), and (4) William. Rudolph ("Rudy") also served but was not deployed overseas.

William Cordova was wounded during the first day of the Omaha Beach invasion in 1944 and 22-year old John Cordova was killed during the battle of Okinawa in 1945. Army records state he "Died of Wounds June 18, 1945." Johnny was initially buried at Okinawa, but his body was exhumed and moved to the Ruiz-Perea Family Cemetery in San Francisquito Canyon.

Patrick Cordova served in 163rd Infantry Division, William Cordova served with 101st Airborne, Michael Cordova trained at Ford Ord and was sent to the Aleutian Islands, Rudolph ("Rudy") Cordova also trained at Fort Ord and transferred to Fort Lee, Virginia. He became a driver for a Colonel Dalton who recognized that he had four brothers serving in combat. Since his brother John had been killed in action, the Colonel made sure Rudy was not deployed overseas.

The oldest Cordova brother, Ignacio, known as "Natch" was not drafted due to medical issues and because he was married with a family to support. Natch worked with the Forest Service. Lawrence Cordova was not drafted because he was the last of the Cordova brothers who could manage their family ranch.

== St. Francis Dam disaster ==
Rosa Cordova was pregnant with her youngest son, Rudolph, when the St. Francis Dam failed on 12 March 1928. She was among those who helped identify the bodies of victims recovered in the wake of the disaster.

Ignacio Cordova found the body of a school friend lodged in a treetop beside the Santa Clara River bed. According to family lore, the victim's apparent death rattle, which Ignacio described as a hiccup sound, had attracted the searchers' attention.

== Castaic Dam ==
Through eminent domain, the government resumed about a thousand acres of Cordova property for the planned Castaic Lake and dam. Construction started in 1967 and was completed in 1973. A large portion of the historic ranch disappeared underwater, including the site of the ancestral ranch-house, as the Castaic Lake filled to capacity.

The family was given 90-days notice to vacate their property. The Cordovas salvaged what they could including the outhouse which was moved to higher ground on ranch land that was not resumed.

Prison workers from a facility in Lancaster were used to dismantle and remove the remaining ranch infrastructure including fences, out buildings used for storage of cattle feed, and the windmill. They burnt the ranch house to the ground as part of this clearing operation, a heartbreaking event for the Cordova family.

With only about 100 acres remaining to continue the ranch operation, the family had to sell most of their cattle. In time, they were able to obtain grazing contracts for adjoining land, including U.S. Forest Service property, which allowed the family to resume cattle ranching.

== Long tradition ==
Cordova family members still reside in Castaic today. Nancy Lynette Cordova, daughter of Lawrence and Bettyrose Cordova, now runs the family ranch. She manages their remaining 100 acres and another 900 acres that have been leased. The annual cattle roundup in June has been a long-held tradition still carried on by family members and their friends.
