= Castaic Dam =

Embankment dam in Los Angeles County, California, United States

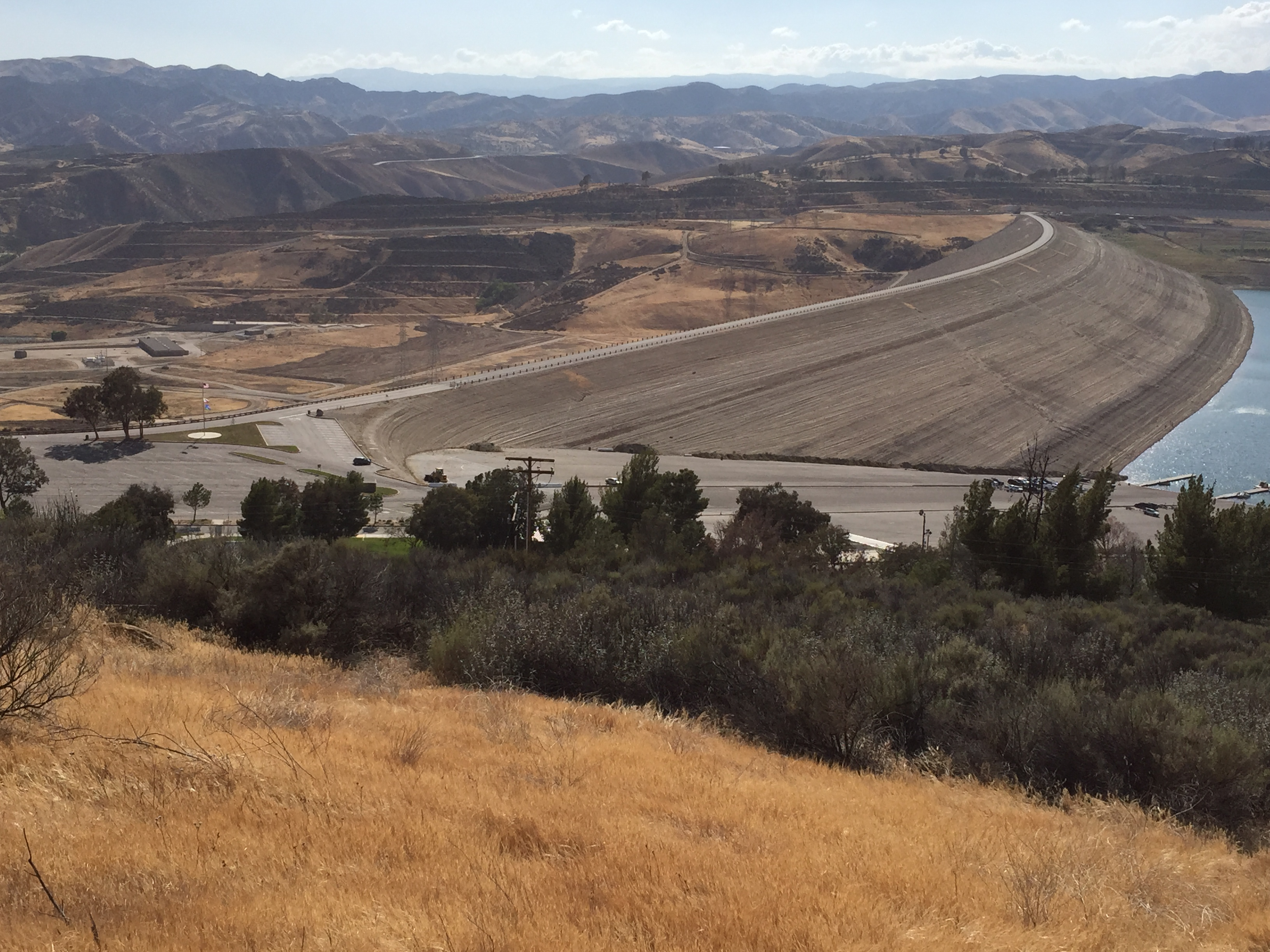
- View from the northeast.
- Interactive map of Castaic Dam
- Location: Castaic, United States
- Coordinates: 34.5194°N 118.6070°W
- Opening date: 1973; 53 years ago

Dam and spillways
- Type of dam: Earthfill
- Impounds: Castaic Creek
- Height: 340 ft (100 m)
- Length: 5,200 ft (1,600 m)
- Dam volume: 44,000,000 yd^{3} (34,000,000 m^{3})
- Spillway type: Uncontrolled overflow

Reservoir
- Creates: Castaic Lake
- Total capacity: 325,000 acre⋅ft (401,000,000 m^{3})
- Catchment area: 153.7 mi^{2} (398 km^{2})
- Surface area: 2,235 acres (904 ha)

Power Station
- Installed capacity: 11 MW

Castaic Dam is an embankment dam in northwestern Los Angeles County, California, in the unincorporated area of Castaic. Although located on Castaic Creek, a major tributary of the Santa Clara River, Castaic Creek provides little of its water. The lake is the terminus of the West Branch of the California Aqueduct, part of the State Water Project. The dam was built by the California Department of Water Resources and construction was completed in 1973. The lake has a capacity of 325,000 acre-feet (401,000,000 m^{3}) and stores drinking water for the western portion of the Greater Los Angeles Area.

== Dimensions ==
Castaic is an earth-fill dam with its surfaces covered with boulders and cobble-sized rocks to prevent erosion. The dam is 340 feet (100 m) high above the streambed, 425 feet (130 m) above the foundations, and 5,200 feet (1,600 m) long, containing 44 million cubic yards (34,000,000 m^{3}) of material. The maximum thickness of the base is 2,350 feet (720 m). Flood waters are released through an ungated, concrete overflow spillway on the west side of the dam, emptying into a stilling basin called Castaic Lagoon (colloquially referred to as the "Lower Lake", while the larger Castaic Lake is called "Upper Lake"). The total storage capacity of Castaic Lake is 325,000 acre⋅ft (401,000,000 m^{3}), of which 31,000 acre-feet (38,000,000 m^{3}) is considered active capacity and 294,000 acre-feet (363,000,000 m^{3}) are considered inactive. The inactive capacity is only used during periods of extended drought or interrupted water delivery, most recently in 2014. At maximum water elevation of 1,515 ft (462 m) AMSL, the lake covers 2,235 acres (904 ha), with 29 miles (47 km) of shoreline. The much smaller Castaic Lagoon can hold 5,560 acre⋅ft (6,860,000 m^{3}) and covers 200 acres (81 ha).

== Operations ==
=== Water supply ===
Castaic Lake is the lower and larger of two main storage reservoirs for the West Branch of the California Aqueduct. Water drawn from the Sacramento–San Joaquin River Delta is transported down the San Joaquin Valley via the California Aqueduct and pumped over the Tehachapi Mountains, where it splits into the East Branch – providing water for Riverside and San Bernardino and eastern Los Angeles Counties – and the West Branch, which supplies western Los Angeles and parts of Ventura County. The West Branch first enters Pyramid Lake, formed by Pyramid Dam, before traveling through the 7.2-mile (11.6 km) Angeles Tunnel to the upper end of Castaic Lake. Together, the two reservoirs can store 505,000 acre⋅ft (623,000,000 m^{3}), or about a year's supply of water. During normal operations, Castaic Lake serves as a regulatory reservoir for water delivered through the California Aqueduct, releasing it at times of peak demand. The dam and lake were also built to provide a pool of emergency storage that can be drawn down if water deliveries from northern California are interrupted, whether due to earthquake, construction, equipment malfunction, or severe drought.

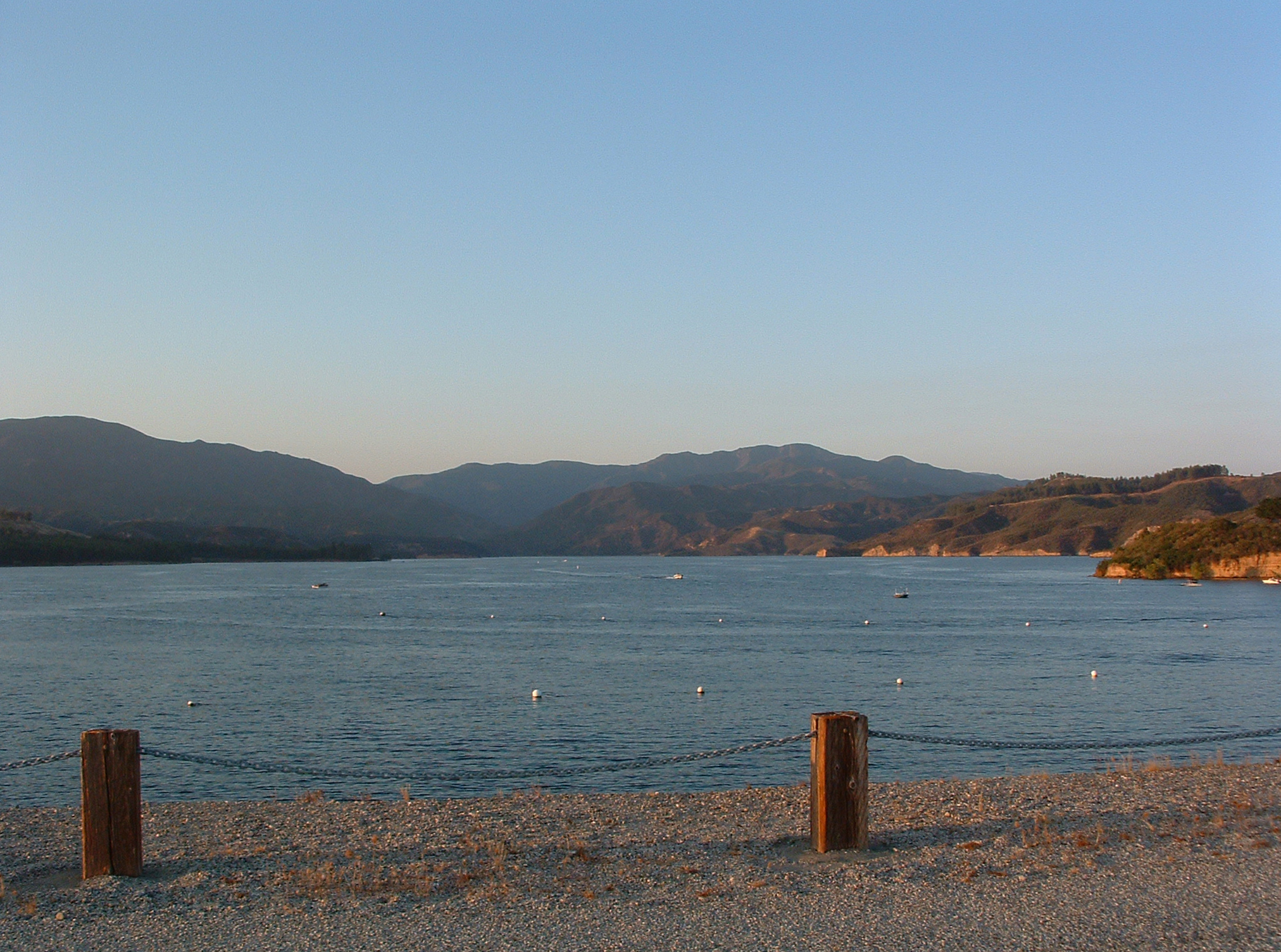
The Castaic Lake.

Below the dam, the majority of the water flows to Los Angeles via a system known as the Foothill Feeder, operated by the Metropolitan Water District of Southern California. The water travels about 20 miles (32 km) south via a 16.75-foot-diameter (5.11 m) pipeline to the Jensen Filtration Plant near San Fernando, where it connects to the municipal water system. The mostly underground, pre-stressed concrete pipe has walls nearly 4 feet (1.2 m) thick. Water from the Foothill Feeder is stored in the smaller Los Angeles Reservoir in the San Fernando Valley. The water continues south via the 45-mile (72 km) Sepulveda Feeder, which provides water to Los Angeles proper and other municipalities in south Los Angeles and Orange Counties. The main customer water agencies are the Central Basin Municipal Water District, West Basin Municipal District, and Municipal Water District of Orange County. As many as 12 million people in these areas receive their full or supplemental water supply from Castaic Lake and the feeder system.

A smaller portion of the water supply is distributed by the Castaic Lake Water Agency. The service area covers about 195 square miles (510 km^{2}) in Ventura and north Los Angeles counties, providing water to about 287,000 people. The main constituents of the agency include the Los Angeles County Waterworks District No. 36, Newhall County Water District, Santa Clara Water Division, and Valencia Water Company.

=== Power generation ===
The 11 MW Foothill Feeder hydroelectric power plant is located at the base of the dam and generates electricity when water is needed in Los Angeles. In 2009, the Foothill Feeder plant generated 49 million kilowatt hours (KWh).

The 1,495 MW (Nominal) Castaic Pumped-Storage Plant is located at the upper end of the west arm of Castaic Lake. The Elderberry Forebay Dam separates the upper arm from the rest of Castaic Lake, maintaining a small pool for power generation known as the Elderberry Forebay, serving as the lower reservoir of the pumped-storage operation. Pyramid Lake, located 7.2 miles (11.6 km) to the west, serves as the upper. When demand for electricity is high, usually during the afternoon, water is withdrawn from Pyramid Lake and released into Castaic Lake. At night, when demand is low, water is pumped back into Pyramid Lake. The sale of peak electricity reduces the Department of Water Resources' overall electric costs for operating the California Aqueduct.

In 2009, the Castaic pumped-storage plant generated a net 465 million KWh.

=== Safety ===
Due to seismic vulnerabilities and its proximity to the San Andreas Fault, the dam has one of the lowest safety ratings in Los Angeles County.

== See also ==
- List of dams and reservoirs in California
- List of power stations in California
- List of the tallest dams in the United States
