= Angeles Tunnel =

Water tunnel under the Sierra Pelona of Los Angeles County, California

Coordinates: 34.5859°N 118.6662°W

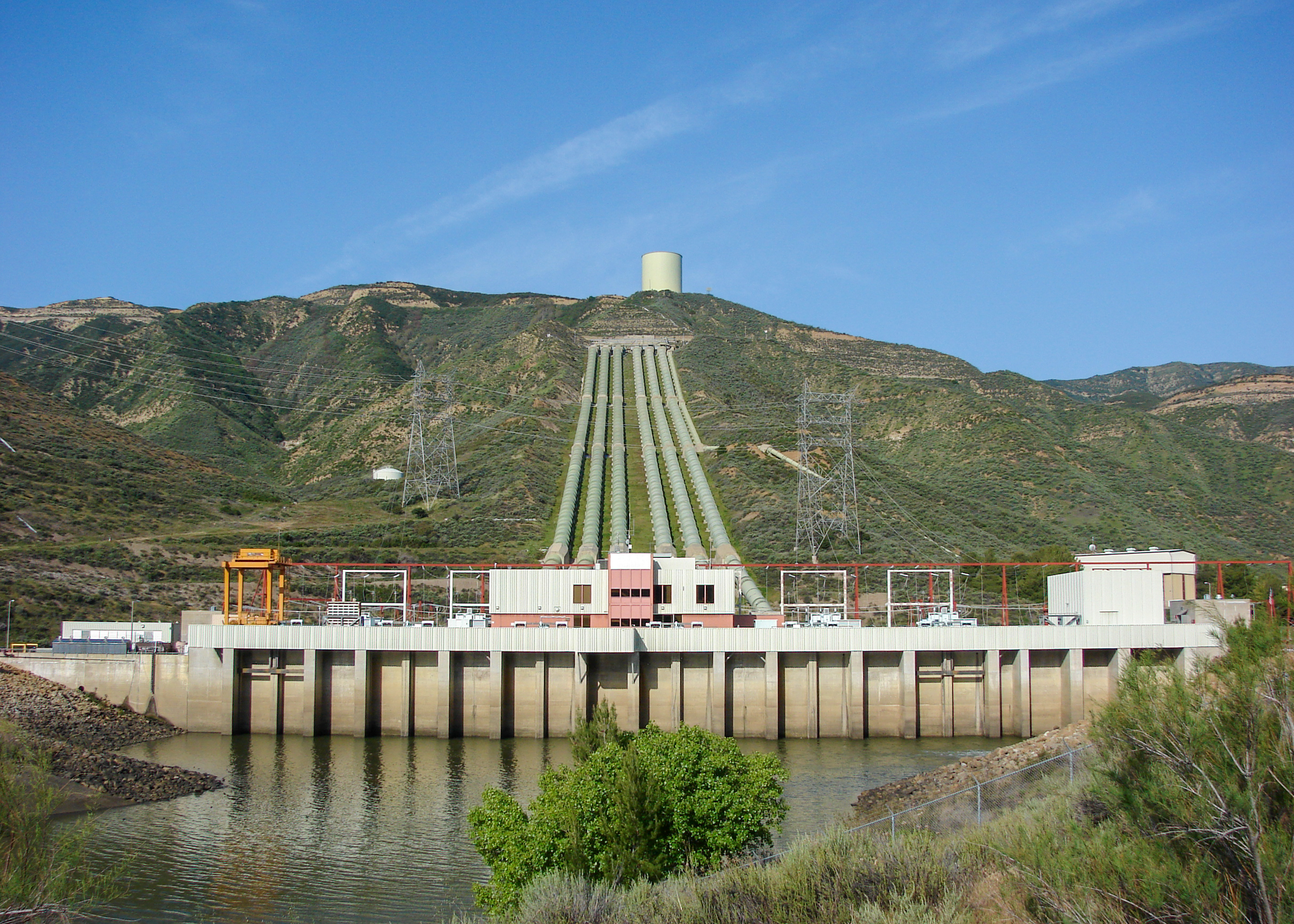
The terminus of the Angeles Tunnel at the Castaic Power Plant

The Angeles Tunnel is a 7.2-mile-long (11.6 km), 30-foot-diameter (9.1 m) water tunnel located in the Sierra Pelona Mountains in Los Angeles County, California, about 50 miles (80 km) north of Los Angeles. It was constructed between 1967 and 1970 as part of the California State Water Project and serves as the final leg of the west branch of the California Aqueduct, which carries Northern California water to Southern California residents.

The tunnel also supplies water to the adjacent Castaic Power Plant, a pumped-storage hydroelectricity generation facility. To facilitate power generation, the tunnel's flow is bidirectional. During on-peak energy-demand hours, water flows downhill through the tunnel, starting at an elevation of 2,572 feet (784 m) in Pyramid Lake, and then falling over 1,000 feet (300 m) to the turbines of the Castaic Power Plant at 1,519 feet (463 m). The water is then stored in the Elderberry Forebay, adjacent to Castaic Lake. During off-peak hours, water is pumped uphill through the tunnel in the opposite direction from Elderberry Forebay and returned to Pyramid Lake. This operation reduces the energy cost of moving water along the California Aqueduct.

== See also ==
- California State Water Project
- California Aqueduct
