= Elderberry Forebay Dam =

- Interactive map of Elderberry Forebay Dam
- Location: Los Angeles County, California
- Coordinates: 34°33′43″N 118°37′51″W
- Opening date: 1974; 52 years ago

Dam and spillways
- Type of dam: Earthfill
- Impounds: Castaic Creek
- Height: 179 ft (55 m)
- Length: 1,935 ft (590 m)
- Elevation at crest: 1,550 ft (470 m)
- Width (base): 25 ft (7.6 m)
- Dam volume: 5,896,950 cu yd (4,508,540 m^{3})

Reservoir
- Creates: Elderberry Forebay
- Total capacity: 28,400 acre⋅ft (35,000 dam^{3})
- Catchment area: 81.6 sq mi (211 km^{2})
- Surface area: 450 acres (180 ha)
- Normal elevation: 1,519 ft (463 m)

Elderberry Forebay Dam is a dam located in the Sierra Pelona Mountains of northwestern Los Angeles County, California. The dam partitions Elderberry Forebay from Castaic Lake. It forms the headwater reservoir for Castaic Power Plant, a pumped-storage hydroelectricity generation facility. The dam was completed in 1974 as part of the California State Water Project.

== See also ==
- California State Water Project
