= Vista del Lago Visitors Center =

Los Angeles County visitor center

Coordinates: 34.6622°N 118.7611°W

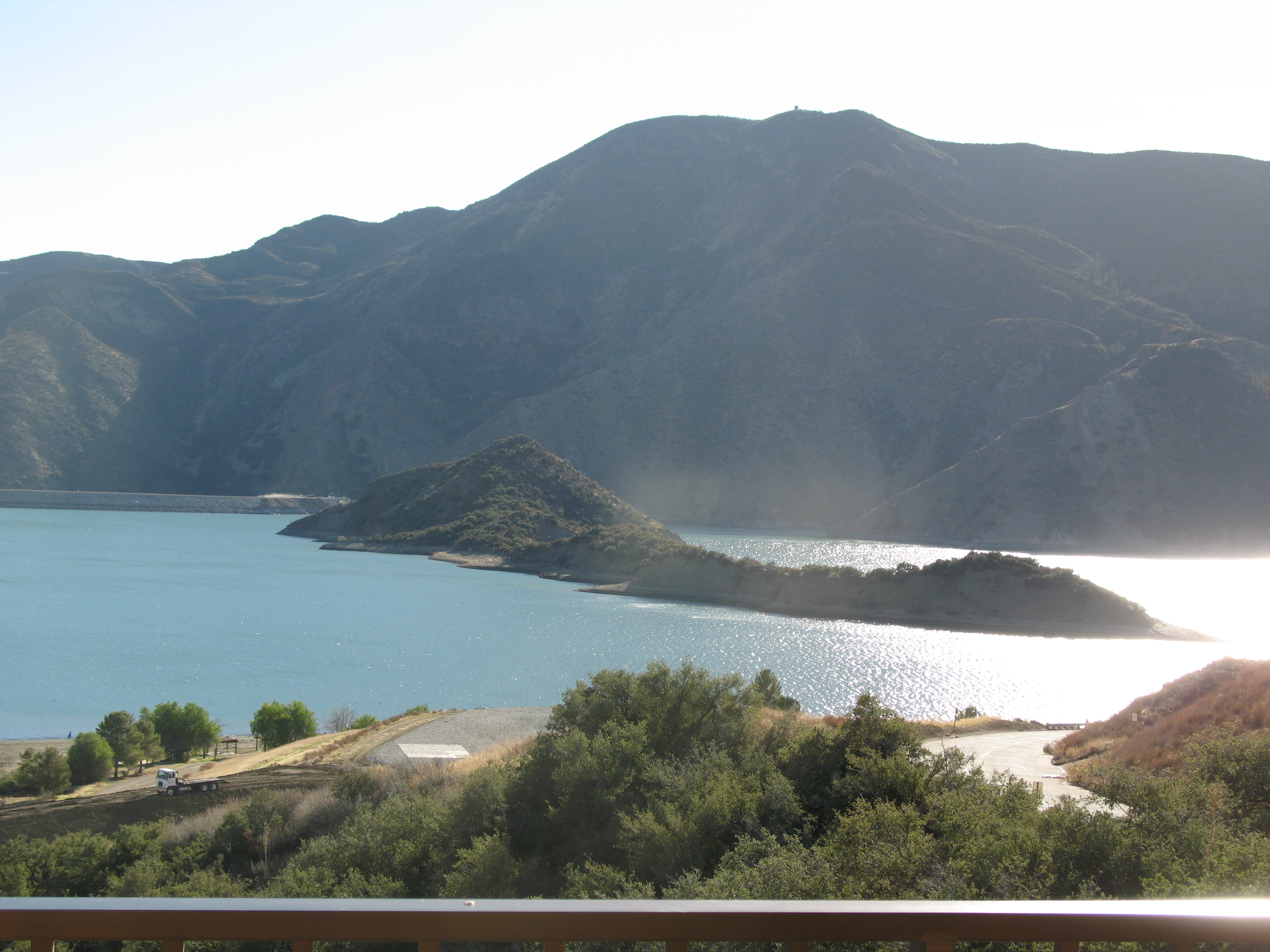
Chumash Island in Pyramid Lake seen from the visitor center.

Vista del Lago Visitors Center is a visitor center above Pyramid Lake in Los Angeles County, between the communities of Gorman and Castaic, near Interstate 5. It features an outdoor overlook of Pyramid Lake and interpretive displays by the California Department of Water Resources, including slide shows and a video.
