= Bouquet Canyon, California =

Canyon in northern Los Angeles County, California, U.S.

Coordinates: 34.4317°N 118.5351°W

Bouquet Canyon, also known as Hangman's Canyon and Dead Man's Canyon, is a canyon in Los Angeles County, California.

== Description ==
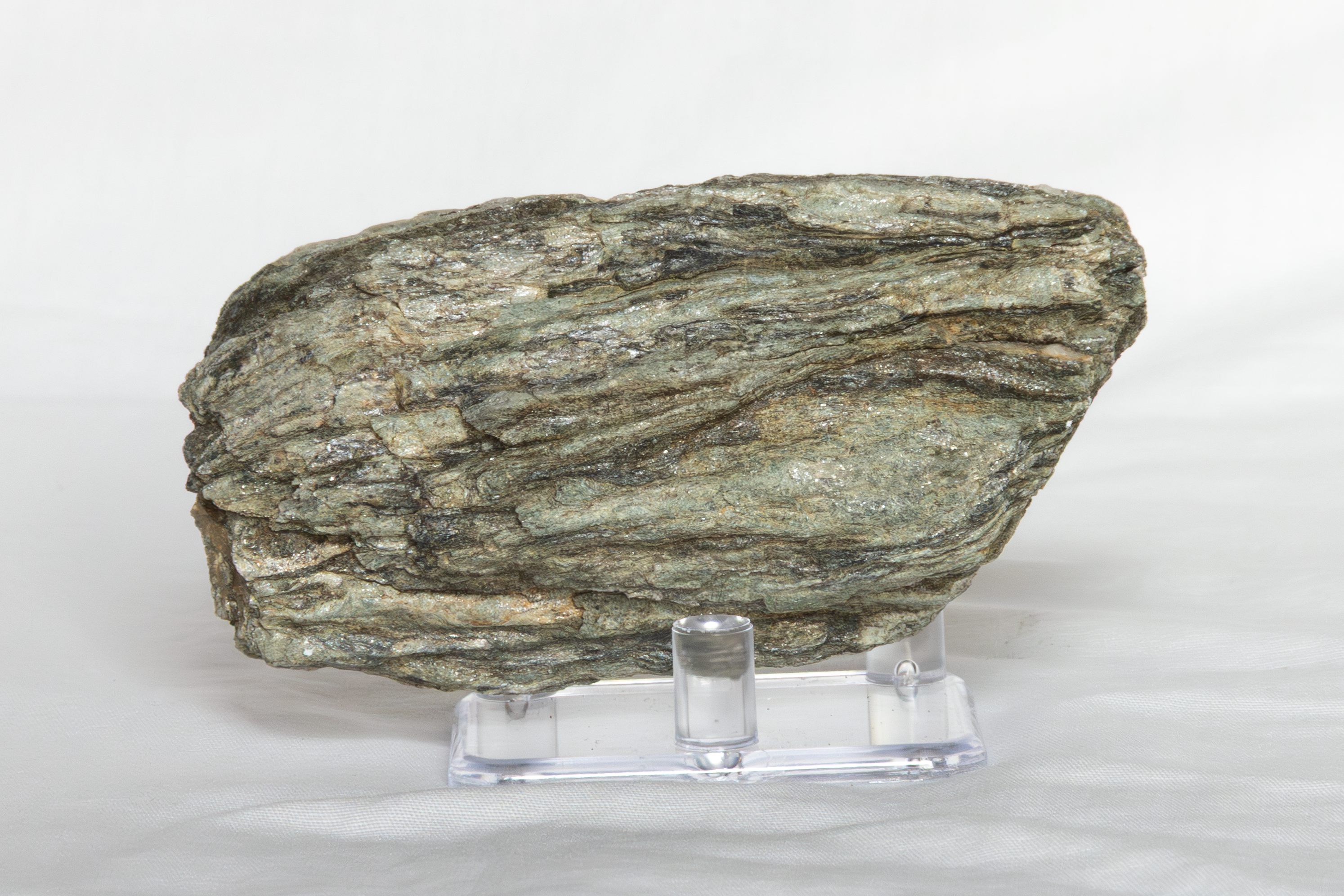
Found in Pelona Schist formation off of Bouquet Canyon Road in abandoned quarry.

Bouquet Canyon is one of many canyons branching from the Santa Clarita Valley in Los Angeles County, whose streams feed the Santa Clara River. The canyon's main stream, Bouquet Creek, begins in the Sierra Pelona Mountains, near Leona Valley. Bouquet Reservoir, formed by the earthen Bouquet Dam is situated along the creek, and forms part of the Los Angeles Aqueduct system. The two-lane Bouquet Canyon Road follows the stream from Leona Valley to the Saugus neighborhood in the city of Santa Clarita, where it becomes a major thoroughfare.

== Name origin ==
The name "Bouquet" is the name of the Californian historic ranch established upland from the crossing of Bouquet Canyon Road and 'Newhall' Ranch Road, and founded by a French vacher who landed in California off a Spanish ship. Buque is Spanish for "ship" and bouquet derives from the ranch's French origins. Bouquet Ranch is the only section of historic the Rancho San Francisco that was legally parceled off and continued under the terms of the Protocol of Querétaro, specified in the Californian Constitution, before agents of the Northeastern Establishment were sent West to take control of lands and cities in the wake of the American Civil War.

The canyon is nicknamed the "Hangman's Canyon" or "Dead Man's Canyon", after an event in the Castaic Range War where a young cowboy was lynched.
