= Disappearance of Bryce Laspisa =

2013 disappearance in California

Bryce Laspisa
- Laspisa's driver's license photo
- Born: Bryce David Laspisa; April 30, 1994; Illinois, U.S.
- Disappeared: August 30, 2013 (aged 19); Castaic Lake, California, U.S.
- Status: Missing for 13 years, 2 months and 10 days
- Height: 5 ft 11 in (180 cm)

On August 30, 2013, Bryce David Laspisa, a 19‑year‑old student from Sierra College in Rocklin, disappeared near Castaic Lake in Los Angeles County, California, after his 2003 Toyota Highlander was found overturned at the bottom of an embankment. In the two days before the crash, he had been driving south toward his parents' home in Laguna Niguel, making a series of unusual stops and phone calls along the way. Although he was seen by a roadside assistance worker and a law enforcement officer in the hours before the vehicle was discovered, no trace of him was found at the scene, and extensive searches of the surrounding area produced no evidence of his whereabouts. His disappearance remains unsolved.

== Background ==
Bryce David Laspisa was born on April 30, 1994, and grew up in Naperville, Illinois, the only child of Karen and Michael. The family later moved to California. In August 2013, Laspisa had spent the summer at his parents' home in Laguna Niguel before returning to Sierra College in Rocklin for the fall semester. In the days after classes resumed, friends reported that his behavior had changed, and he gave away some of his personal belongings. On August 28, he drove to Chico and broke up with his girlfriend. After leaving her apartment, he intended to make the roughly 500‑mile drive back to his parents' home in Orange County.

== Disappearance ==
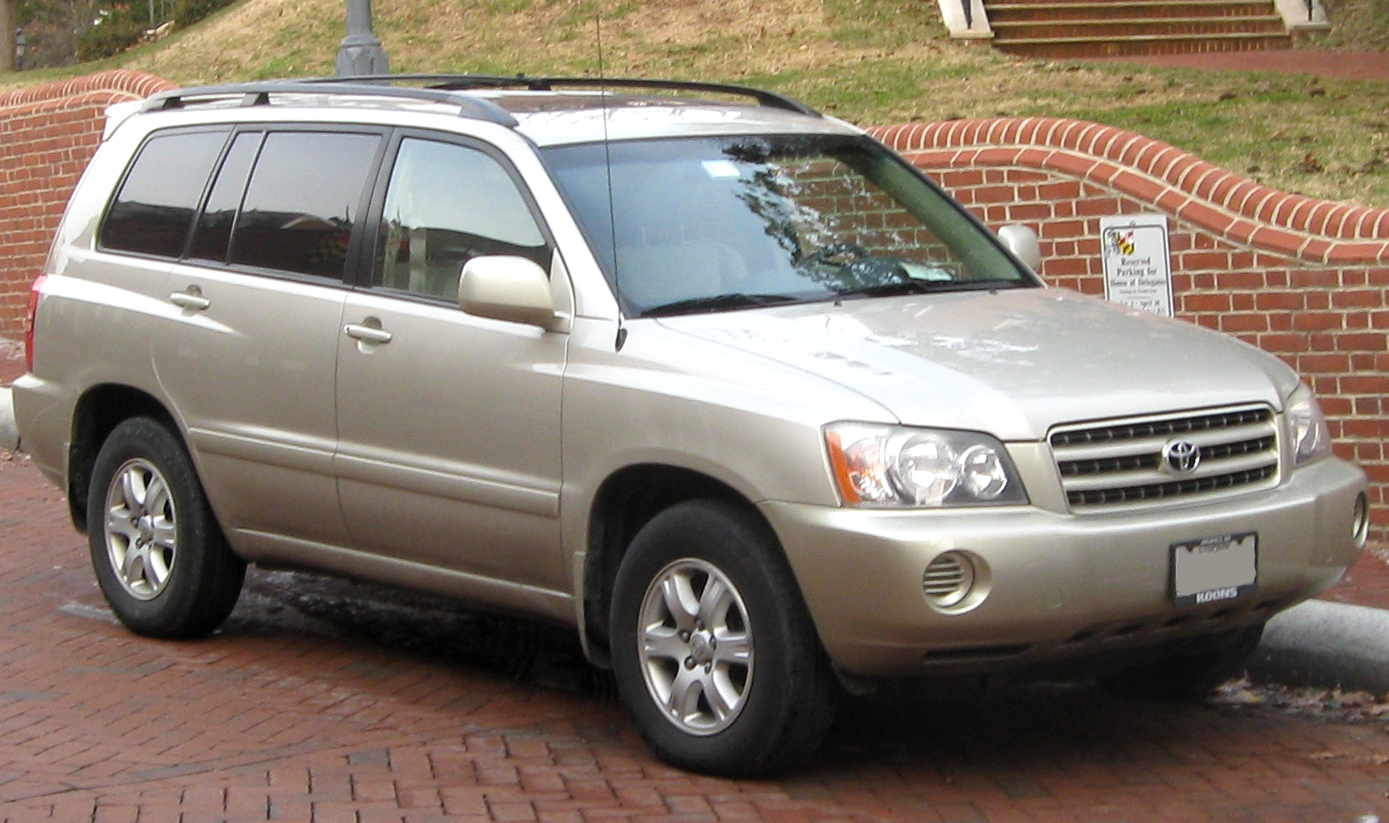
A 2001–2003 Toyota Highlander similar to the SUV driven by Laspisa

On August 29, 2013, Laspisa's parents became concerned when they learned that the family's vehicle had required roadside assistance earlier that day in Buttonwillow, Kern County. He had run out of fuel and contacted a local service provider, who delivered gas to him. Despite receiving help, Laspisa remained parked in the same spot for several hours. Unable to reach him, his mother asked the service provider to check on him again. The owner returned and found Laspisa still in the same location and, after speaking with him, encouraged him to continue his drive. Laspisa then phoned his mother and said he was heading home to Laguna Niguel, a trip that normally took about three hours.

When he did not arrive by evening, his parents reported him missing to the Orange County Sheriff's Office. Investigators determined that his phone remained in Kern County, and after 7 p.m., a Kern County deputy located him only a short distance from where he had been earlier in Buttonwillow. The deputy checked on him, found no signs of impairment, and searched the vehicle, reporting that nothing concerning was discovered.

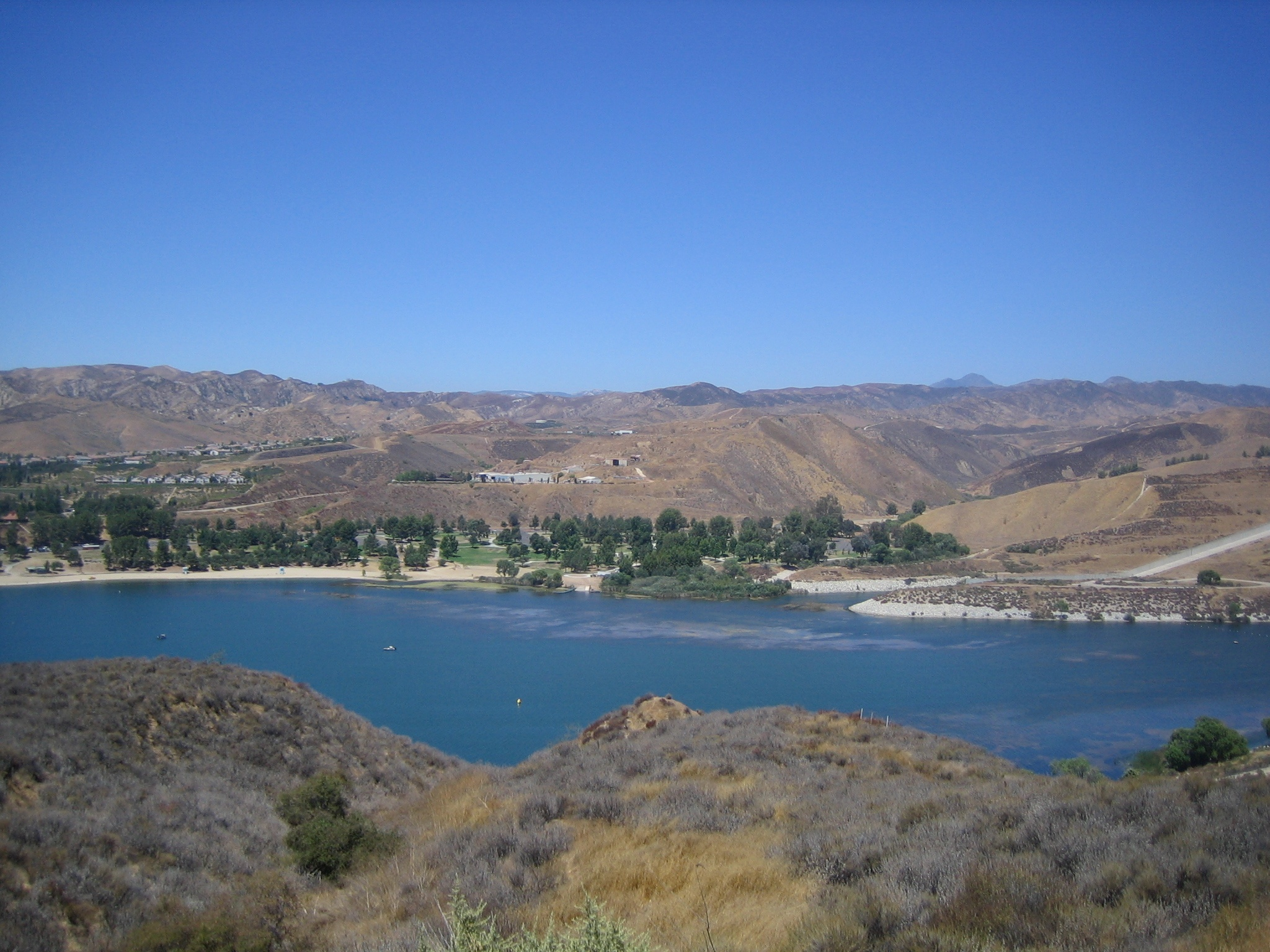
Castaic Lake

At 2:08 a.m. on August 30, Laspisa called his mother again and said he had pulled off Interstate 5 to rest because he was tired. He described the area as a residential neighborhood, though his exact location was unclear. He planned to sleep briefly before continuing the drive. A few hours later, the family's doorbell rang, and they initially believed Laspisa had arrived home. Instead, a California Highway Patrol officer informed them that their 2003 Toyota Highlander had been found between 4:20 and 5:15 a.m. in Castaic, Los Angeles County, roughly 90 miles south of Buttonwillow and about two hours north of Laguna Niguel. The SUV had gone down a 15-foot embankment near Main Ramp Road at Castaic Lake and was discovered on its side.

== Investigation and aftermath ==
Detectives examined the SUV and confirmed that Laspisa's personal belongings, including his phone, wallet and laptop, were inside. The rear window had been removed, and investigators believed he exited through the back of the vehicle. Blood on the windshield was attributed to the crash impact, but there was no evidence of a life‑threatening injury at the scene.

Following the discovery of Laspisa's vehicle, the Los Angeles County Sheriff's Department coordinated an extensive search of the surrounding area. Ground teams, helicopters, divers, scent‑tracking dogs, and volunteers covered the lake, shoreline, and nearby terrain over several days. No physical trace of Laspisa was found, and investigators reported no clear indication of the direction he may have taken after leaving the vehicle.

In September 2013, a burned body found near Castaic Lake prompted speculation about a possible connection, but investigators later confirmed the remains belonged to an unrelated homicide victim from Los Angeles.

Laspisa's disappearance was featured in a 2016 episode of the television series Disappeared.

Over the years, additional tips and reported sightings were investigated, including a widely circulated 2022 photograph of a man in Missoula, Montana, who resembled Laspisa. A detective located the individual and confirmed he was not Laspisa.

== See also ==
- List of people who disappeared mysteriously (2000–present)
