= Pyramid Lake (Los Angeles County, California) =

Reservoir in Los Angeles County, California, United States

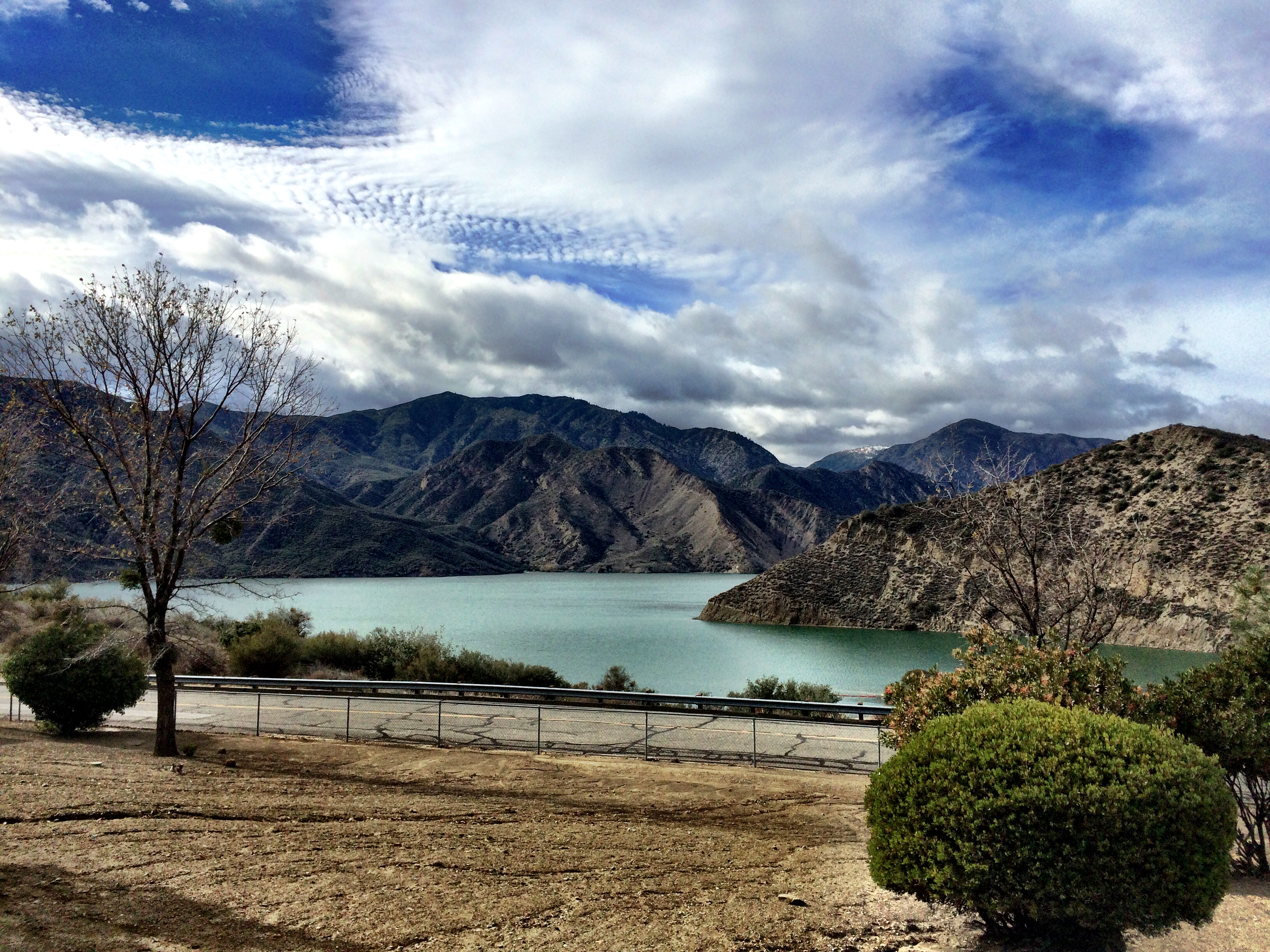
- Pyramid Lake and Topatopa Mountains.

- Location within the Los Angeles metropolitan area Location within California Location within the United States
- Location: Angeles National Forest / Los Padres National Forest; Los Angeles County, California
- Coordinates: 34°38′39″N 118°45′51″W
- Type: Reservoir
- Primary inflows: West Branch California Aqueduct; Piru Creek
- Primary outflows: West Branch California Aqueduct; Piru Creek
- Basin countries: United States
- Surface area: 1.97 sq mi (5.1 km^{2})
- Average depth: 200 ft (61 m)
- Max. depth: 355 ft (108 m)
- Water volume: 222,000 acre⋅ft (274,000,000 m^{3})
- Shore length^{1}: 21 mi (34 km)
- Surface elevation: 786 m (2,579 ft)
- References: U.S. Geological Survey Geographic Names Information System: Pyramid Lake
- ^{1} Shore length is not a well-defined measure.

Pyramid Lake is a reservoir formed by Pyramid Dam on Piru Creek in the western Sierra Pelona Mountains, near Castaic, Southern California. It is a part of the West Branch California Aqueduct, which is a part of the California State Water Project. Its water is fed by the system after being pumped up from the San Joaquin Valley and through the Tehachapi Mountains.

== Background ==
This lake was created in 1972, and completed in 1973, as a holding reservoir for the California State Water Project. The lake was named after a pyramid-shaped rock carved out by engineers building U.S. Route 99. Travelers between Los Angeles and Bakersfield christened the landmark “Pyramid Rock”, which still stands just adjacent to the dam.

The 118 m (387 ft) earth and rock dam was built by the California Department of Water Resources and was completed in 1973. Pyramid Lake is part of the California Aqueduct, which is part of the California State Water Project. Outflow goes downstream to Castaic Lake, which is the terminus of this West Branch aqueduct line.

Pyramid and Castaic lakes act as the upper and lower reservoirs for the Castaic Power Plant, a 1,495-megawatt pumped storage hydroelectric plant located at Castaic Lake. The plant generates electricity from the water that flows down from Pyramid Lake to Castaic Lake, and can store energy by pumping water in the reverse direction when desired.

Its name comes from the Pyramid Rock, created when a ridge was cut through in 1932 by the Ridge Route Alternate (US 99). Pyramid Rock still exists directly in front of the dam.

In 1843, gold was discovered near what is now Pyramid Lake, in the Santa Feliciana Canyon, just south of what is now Pyramid Dam. The small find failed to trigger a rush to the mountainous countryside. Only Francisco Lopes, owner of Rancho Temescal, a Mexican land grant, and a handful of ranchers attempted to settle the region.

== Geography ==
Pyramid Lake is built up along the steep canyon walls surrounding Piru Creek.

The 180,000-acre-foot (220,000,000 m^{3}) reservoir lies on the border between the Angeles National Forest and the Los Padres National Forest, in the northwestern portion of Los Angeles County. It is to the west of Interstate 5 (I-5) south of Tejon Pass. The former alignment of US 99 is below the waters here, replaced by I-5. The lake also lies between the Sierra Pelona and the Topatopa Mountains. Just below the dam, Piru Creek returns to its natural state as it winds down through the Topatopa Mountains to feed into the Lake Piru reservoir and later the Santa Clara River. Water from Pyramid Lake continues through the Angeles Tunnel to Castaic Lake, which is the terminus of the west branch of the aqueduct.

== Recreation ==
Pyramid Lake offers boating, fishing, jet skiing, and picnic areas (including 5 unique sites that are accessible only by boat), and courtesy docks. Vista del Lago Visitors Center overlooks the lake. Access is from exiting Interstate 5 at Vista Del Lago Road (Exit 191).

Fishing is allowed from every location at Pyramid Lake. This includes fish such as large mouth bass, small mouth bass, striped bass, blue gill, crappie, and some trout. The California Office of Environmental Health Hazard Assessment (OEHHA) has developed a safe-eating advisory for fish caught in Piru Creek based on levels of mercury or PCBs found in local species.

Access to the lake was temporarily closed in June 2024 due to the impacts of the Post Fire.

== Gallery ==
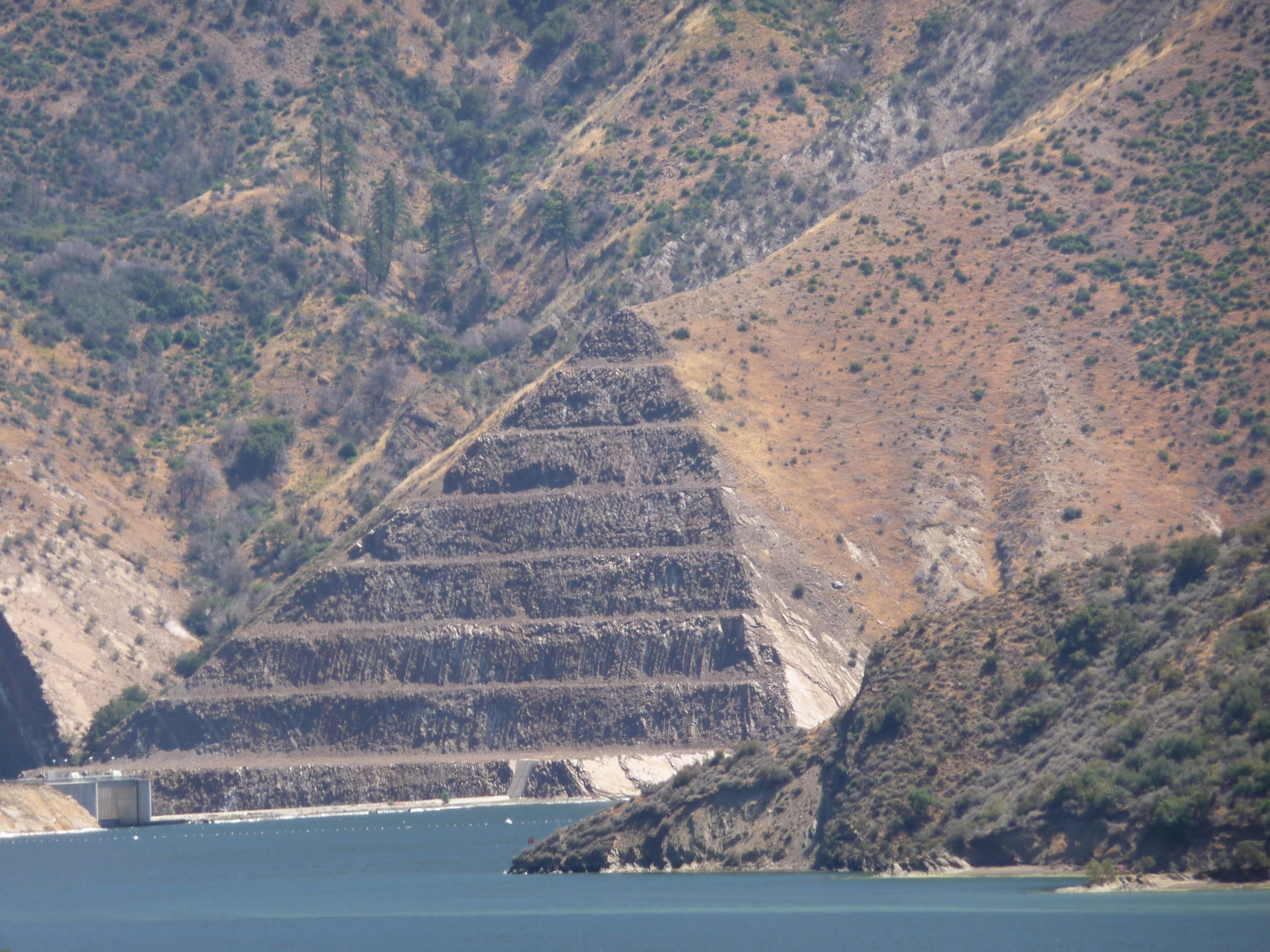
Pyramid Lake earthworks.

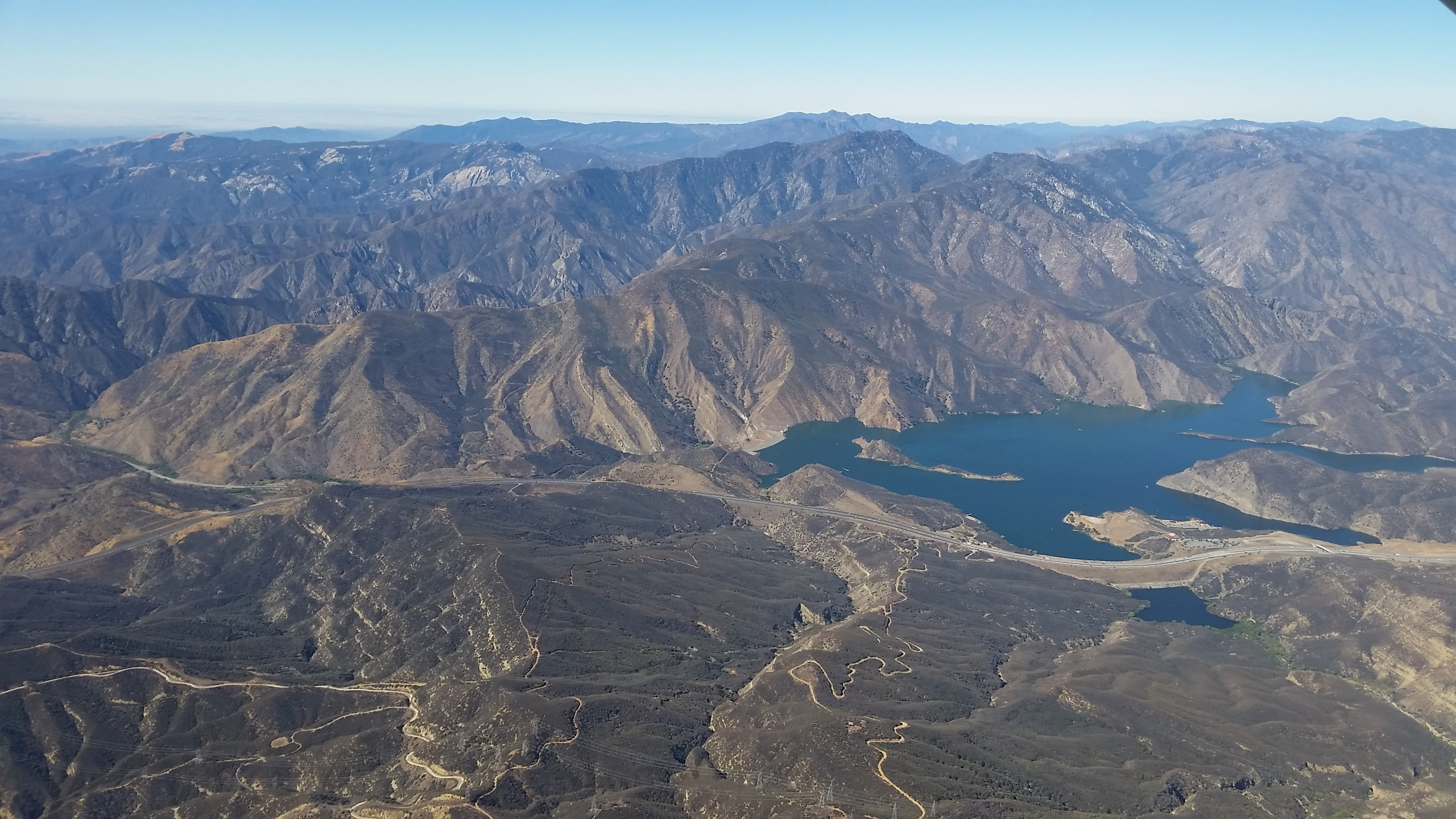
Pyramid Lake seen from the air with the Pacific Ocean in the distance.

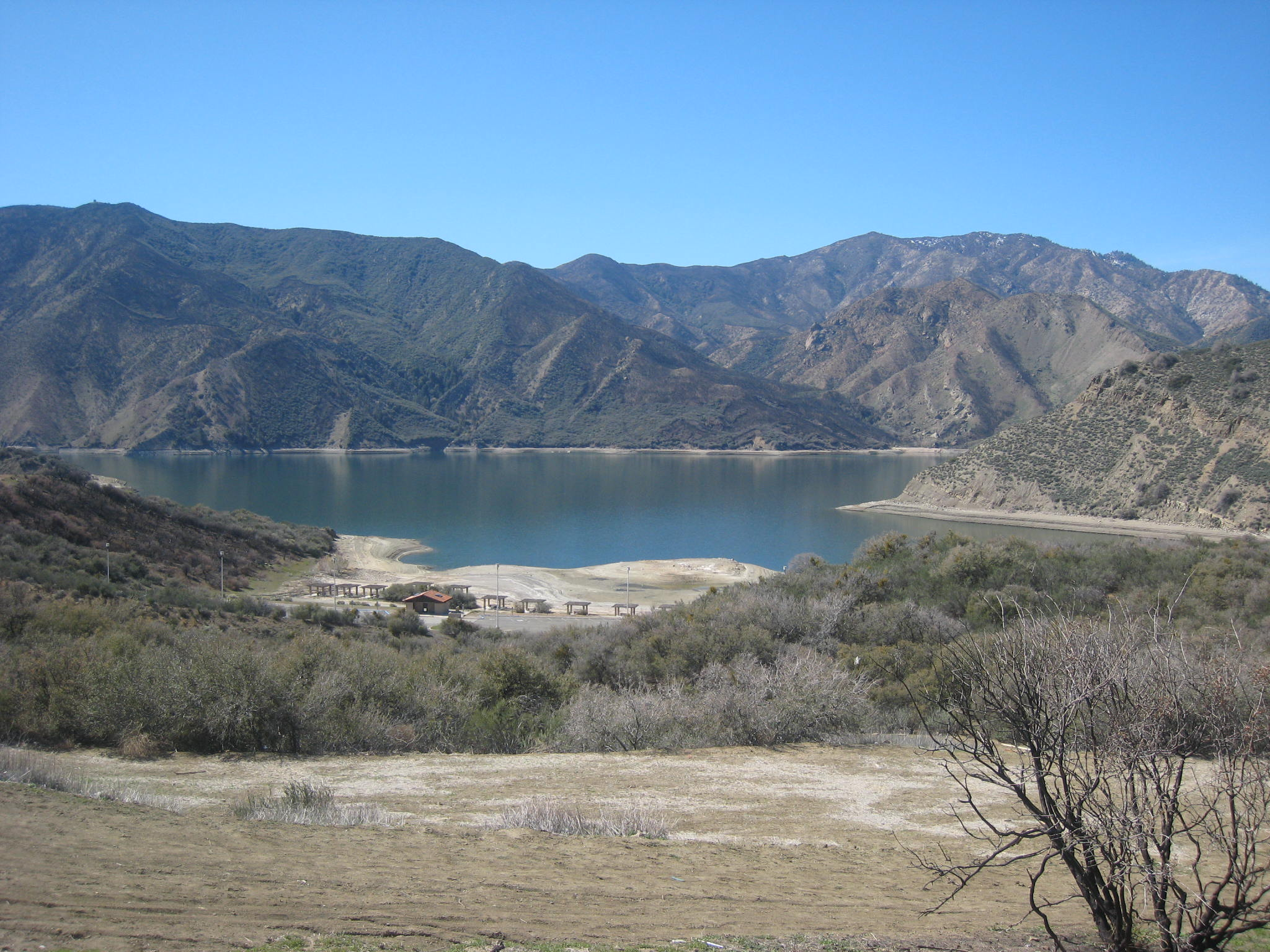
Pyramid Lake and San Emigdio Mountains.

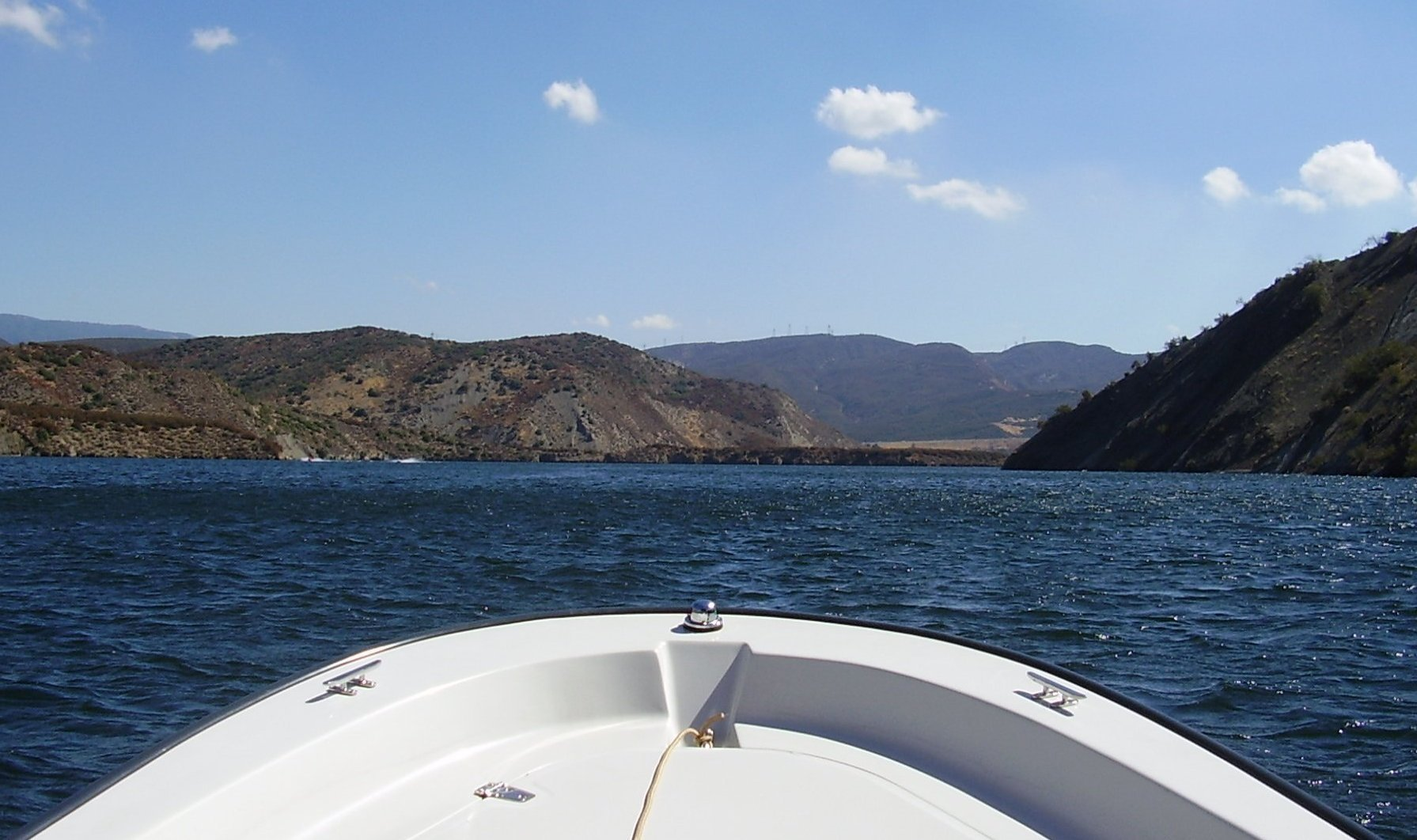
View south towards Pyramid Dam from boat.

== See also ==
- List of dams and reservoirs in California
- List of lakes in California
- Dome Mountain (Los Angeles County)
