= Castaic Junction, California =

Unincorporated community in California, United States

- Unincorporated community
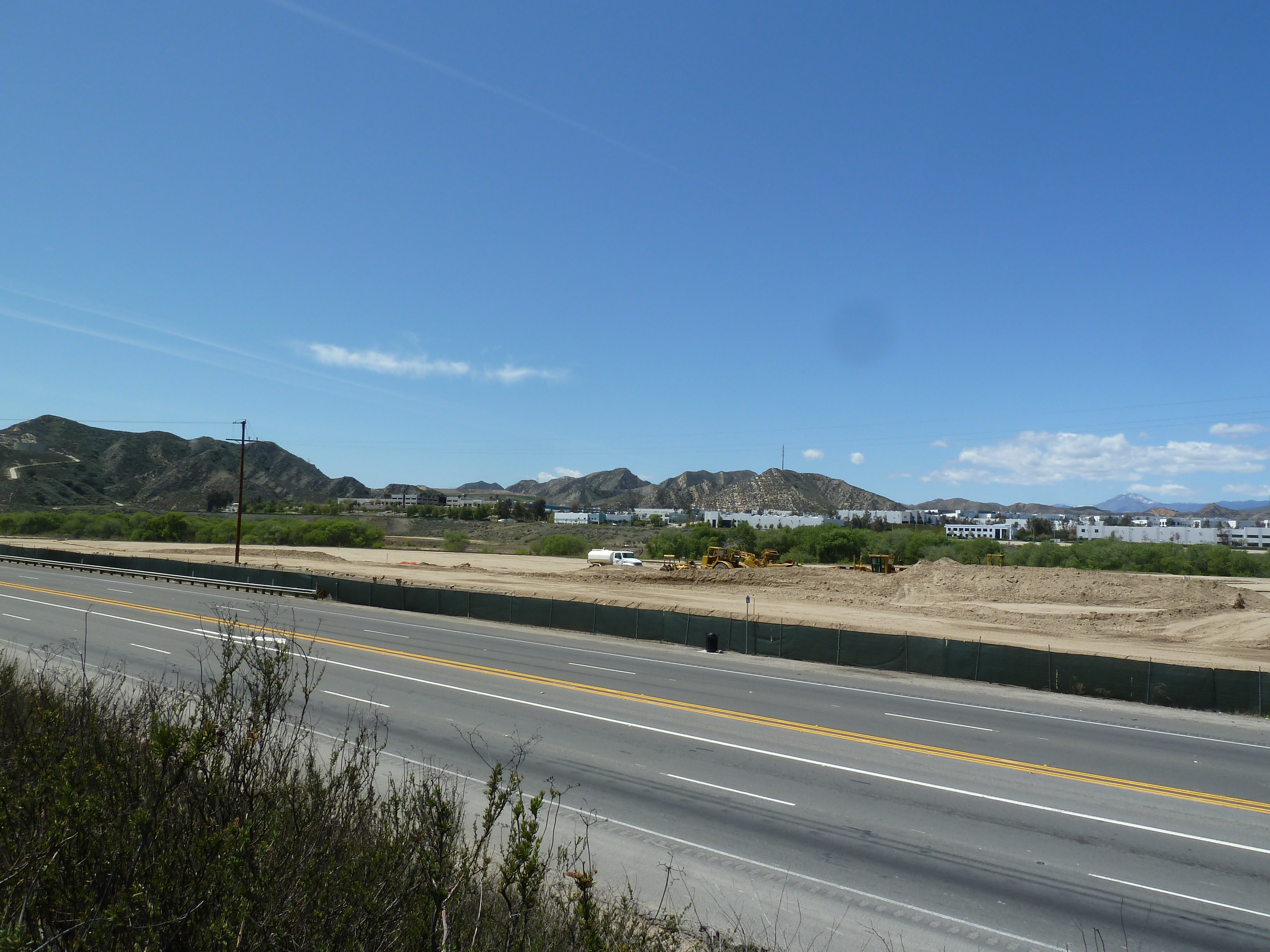
- Castaic Junction as viewed from SR 126

- Location within Santa Clarita Location within California
- Coordinates: 34°26′35″N 118°36′39″W
- Country: United States
- State: California
- County: Los Angeles
- Elevation: 1,017 ft (310 m)
- Time zone: UTC-8 (Pacific (PST))
  - Summer (DST): UTC-7 (PDT)
- Area code: 661
- GNIS feature ID: 270336

Castaic Junction is an unincorporated community located in Los Angeles County, California, United States. It is located at the crossroads of Interstate 5 and State Route 126, near the confluence of Castaic Creek and the Santa Clara River.

Places in Castaic Junction carry a Valencia zip code (91355), and it is adjacent to the City of Santa Clarita.

Six Flags Magic Mountain theme park is just south of the junction.

== History ==
Father Juan Crespí camped near what is now Castaic Junction in 1769, at which time there was a "thriving Indian village" on the site.

Castaic Junction was the official southern end of the Ridge Route. The name dates to 1887, before highways were built, when a railroad siding was set up at the junction.

A highway bridge at Castaic Junction was destroyed by the collapse of the St. Francis Dam in 1928.

The community had an Art Deco−Moderne style train depot, serving the railroad line that ran along the Santa Clara River between Saugus and Piru. The depot was demolished around 1990.

Just beyond the north end of the Magic Mountain parking lot is the site of the adobe ranch house for the historic Rancho San Francisco, a Mexican land grant that encompassed the Santa Clarita Valley from Piru to Canyon Country.

According to local legend, icon James Dean ate his last meal at the Tip's Restaurant formerly at the crossroads of Highway 126 and The Old Road before he drove on north.

== See also ==
- Santa Clarita, California topics
- Rancho San Francisco
- Death Valley '49ers § Burnt Wagons (Jayhawkers)
