= Castaic Creek =

Tributary of the Santa Clara River in California, United States

Coordinates: 34°25′10″N 118°37′48″W

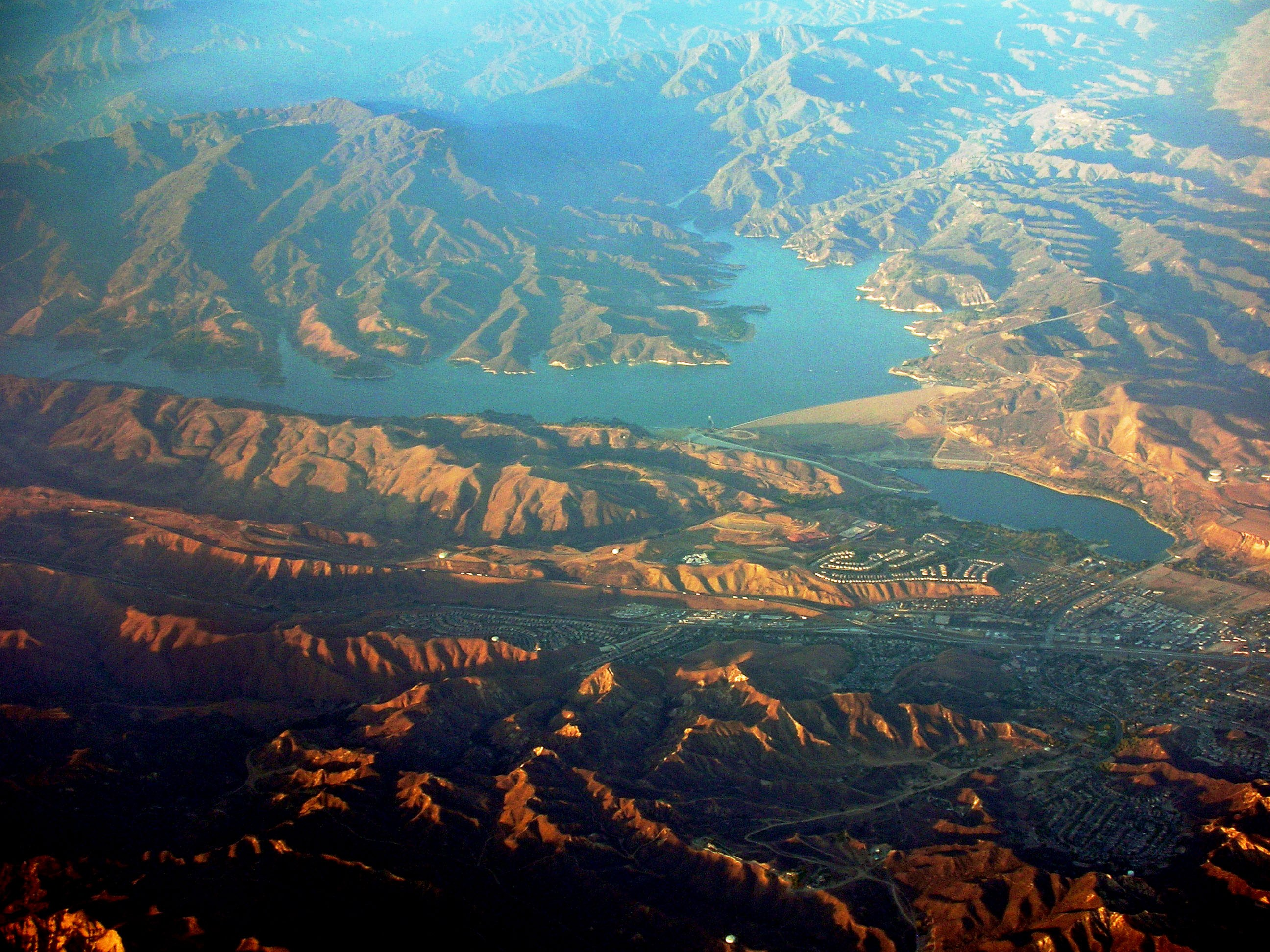
- Castaic Lake, with Castaic Lagoon and lower Castaic Creek in center-right side.

Location
- Country: United States
- State: California
- Region: Los Angeles County

Physical characteristics
- Source
  - location: Sierra Pelona Mountains
- Mouth
  - location: confluence with Santa Clara River at Castaic Junction
- Length: 25 mi (40 km)

Basin features
- River system: Santa Clara River

Castaic Creek (Chumash: Kaštiq) is a 25.0-mile-long (40.2 km) watershed in the Sierra Pelona Mountains, in northeastern Los Angeles County, California. It is a tributary of the Santa Clara River.

== Castaic Lake ==
Castaic Dam on the creek forms Castaic Lake, but most of the water comes from the West Branch of the West Branch California Aqueduct, part of the California State Water Project. The 323,700 acre-foot (399,300,000 m^{3}) lake is the terminus for west branch of the aqueduct. The aqueduct delivers water to the lake by a pipeline from Pyramid Lake.

Besides storing drinking water, Castaic Lake is the lower reservoir in a pumped-storage hydroelectric system. During times of peak electricity demand, water is released from Pyramid Lake and run through the turbines at Castaic Power Plant. At night, when demand and electricity prices are lower, water is pumped from Castaic Lake to Pyramid Lake. The income from the electricity sold offsets a portion of the cost for pumping the water in some parts of the aqueduct, such as over the Tehachapi Mountains.

== Creek resumes ==
Some water is released into Castaic Lagoon, immediately downstream of the dam. The lagoon provides Groundwater recharge of the aquifer and recreation. Downstream of the lagoon, water continues in Castaic Creek through the southwestern foothills of the Sierra Pelona Mountains to its confluence with the Santa Clara River, a few miles west of Santa Clarita. The rest is distributed to the northern Greater Los Angeles Area by pipelines.

== See also ==
- Santa Clara River topics
- San Francisquito Creek (Santa Clara River)
- St. Francis Dam
- List of rivers of California
