= Castaic Lake =

Reservoir in Los Angeles County, California, United States

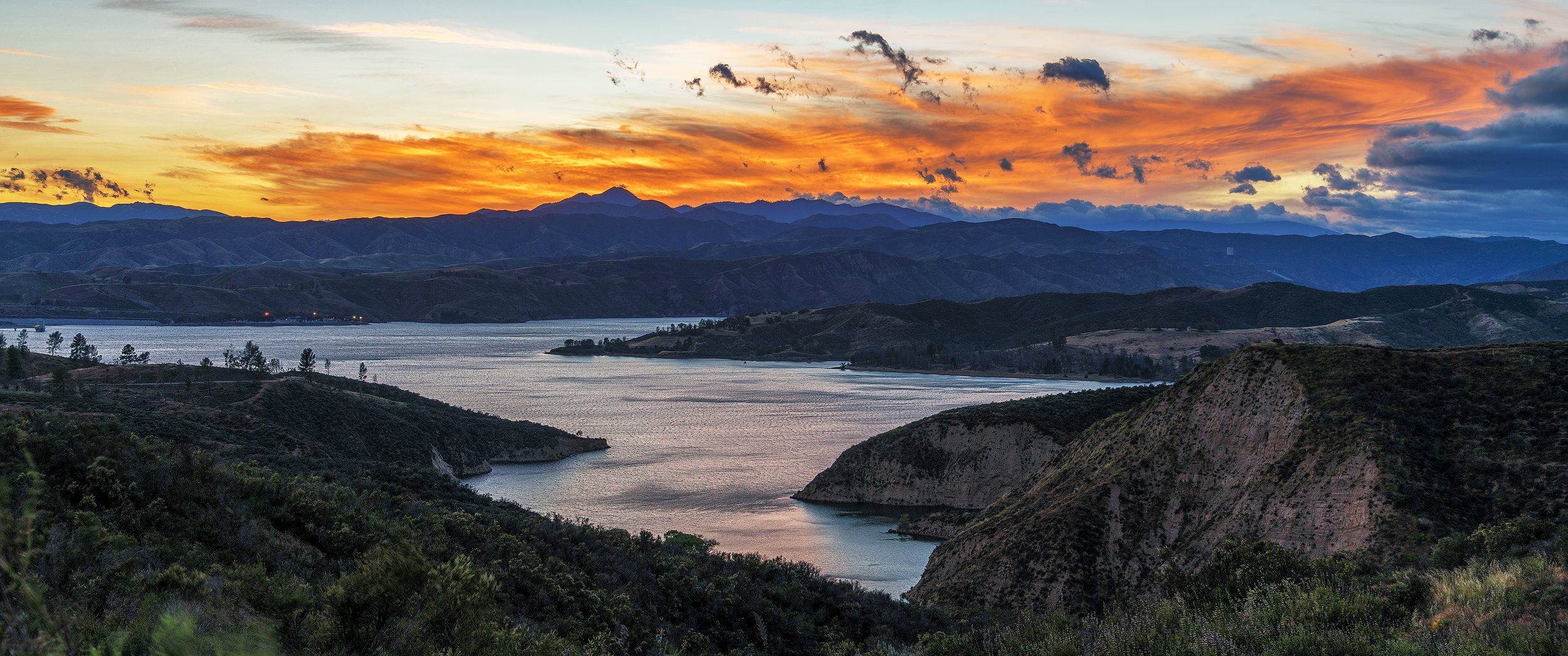
- Castaic Lake at sunset

- Location within the Los Angeles metropolitan area Location within California Location within the United States
- Location: Castaic, Los Angeles County, California
- Coordinates: 34.53°N 118.61°W
- Type: Reservoir
- Primary inflows: West Branch California Aqueduct; Castaic Creek watershed Lake Elizabeth Canyon Creek
- Primary outflows: Castaic Creek
- Catchment area: 220.48 square miles (571.0 km^{2})
- Basin countries: United States
- Surface area: 3.45 square miles (8.9 km^{2})
- Average depth: 147 feet (45 m)
- Max. depth: 330 feet (100 m)
- Water volume: 320,000 acre⋅ft (390,000,000 m^{3})
- Surface elevation: 1,519 feet (463 m)

Castaic Lake (Chumash: Kaštiq) is a reservoir formed by Castaic Dam on Castaic Creek, in the Sierra Pelona Mountains of northwestern Los Angeles County, California, United States, near the town of Castaic.

The California Office of Environmental Health Hazard Assessment has issued a safety advisory for any fish caught in Castaic Lake and Castaic Lagoon due to elevated levels of mercury and PCBs.

== Description ==
The 320,000 acre⋅ft (390,000,000 m^{3}) lake, with a surface elevation of approximately 1,500 feet (460 m) above sea level, is the terminus of the West Branch California Aqueduct, though some of its water comes from the 154-square-mile (400 km^{2}) Castaic Creek watershed above the dam. Castaic Lake is bisected by the Elderberry Forebay Dam, which creates the adjacent Elderberry Forebay. The aqueduct water comes from Pyramid Lake through the Angeles Tunnel and is used to power Castaic Power Plant, a pumped-storage hydroelectric facility on the northern end of the forebay. Water is mostly powering the turbines, rather than being pumped by them.

=== Distribution ===
Water from the lake is distributed throughout the northern portion of the Greater Los Angeles Area. Some water is released into Castaic Lagoon below the dam, to maintain its water level for recreation. Castic Lagoon drains into Castaic Creek, which flows south until it meets the Santa Clara River, a few miles west of Santa Clarita.

== Recreational activities ==
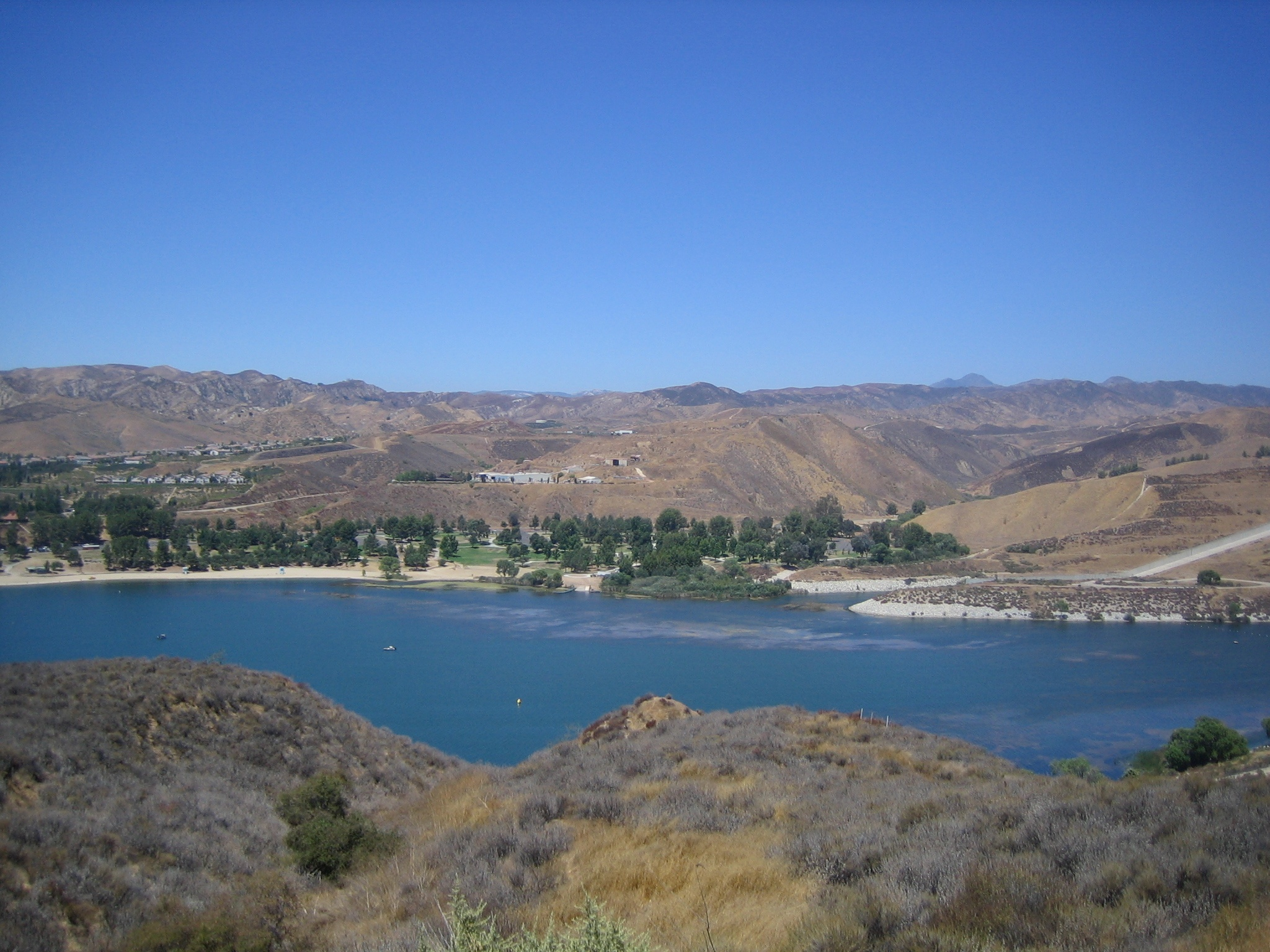
Castaic Lake

Castaic Lake State Recreation Area is a state park located in northwestern Los Angeles County near the community of Castaic, north of Santa Clarita. It is controlled by the California Department of Parks and Recreation. The recreational area is adjacent to the Angeles National Forest. The 4,224-acre (1,709 ha) park was established in 1965. The area encompasses Castaic Lake. Primary access is via Interstate 5 at exits 176A and 176B at the town of Castaic.

Castaic Lake has a lower lagoon with a swim beach that is open from Memorial Day weekend to Labor Day weekend annually. This lake also offers bass fishing in the upper and lower lake year-round and float tube fishing in the lower lake.

Due to the Los Angeles County's budget cuts, the Lake became one of six regional parks closed on Mondays and Tuesdays, starting from June 30, 2025.

== In popular culture ==
Castaic Lake was one of the main filming locations for the Mighty Morphin Power Rangers series. Many of the action scenes were recorded here. It would be frequently used in every season until the end of Power Rangers Wild Force. It was also used in VR Troopers, Masked Rider, and Beetleborgs.

The lake was the site of the Disappearance of Bryce Laspisa in 2013.

Castaic Lake was the starting point for The Amazing Race 26 on November 12, 2014. NBC's Fear Factor was also shot there.

Musician Baby Keem's debut album The Melodic Blue's album cover photo was taken at Castaic Lake.

The lake also served as the main filming location for the music video of Sabrina Carpenter's 2024 hit single "Espresso”, filmed in the spring of the same year.

== See also ==
- List of dams and reservoirs in California
- List of lakes in California
- List of largest reservoirs of California
