= Forebay (reservoir) =

Artificial pool of water ahead of a larger body of water

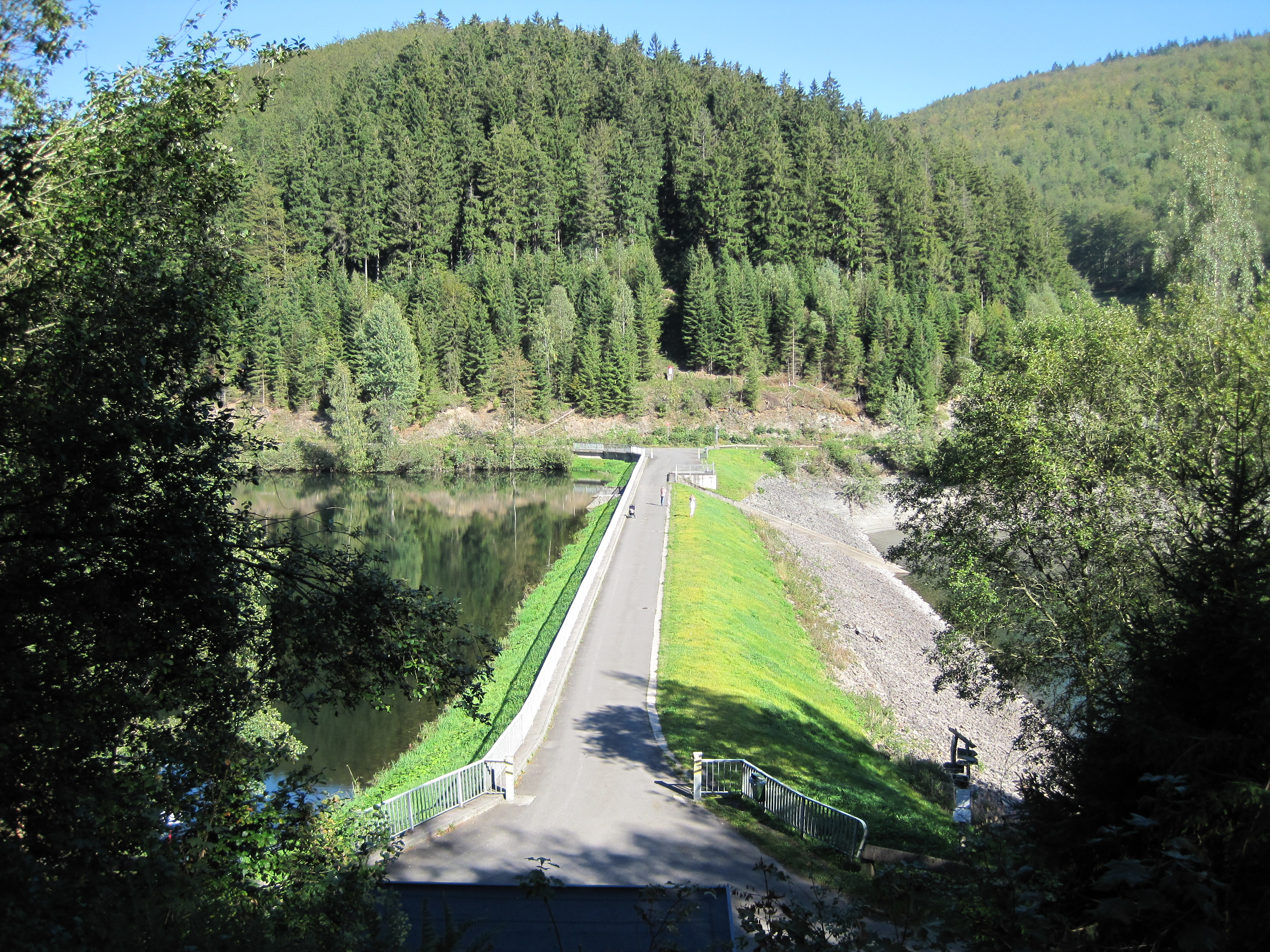
The Schleusegrund forebay and pre-dam, part of the Schönbrunn Dam system

A forebay is an artificial pool of water in front of a larger body of water. The larger body of water may be natural or human-made.

Forebays have a number of functions. They are used in flood control to act as a buffer during flooding or storm surges, impounding water and releasing in a controlled way into the larger waterbody. They may be used upstream of reservoirs to trap sediment and debris (sometimes called a sediment forebay) in order to keep the reservoir clean. This entails the use of a dam built upstream of the main reservoir, called a forebay dam or pre-dam. Forebays may also be used upstream of lakes to prevent siltation. Some forebays are used simply to create a natural habitat for flora and fauna, to counterbalance the environmental impact of a dam or reservoir. Forebays vary greatly in size depending on their situation and purpose.

A forebay can also be a reservoir from which water is taken to run machinery such as turbines.
