= Castaic Power Plant =

Pumped-storage hydroelectric power station in Los Angeles County, California

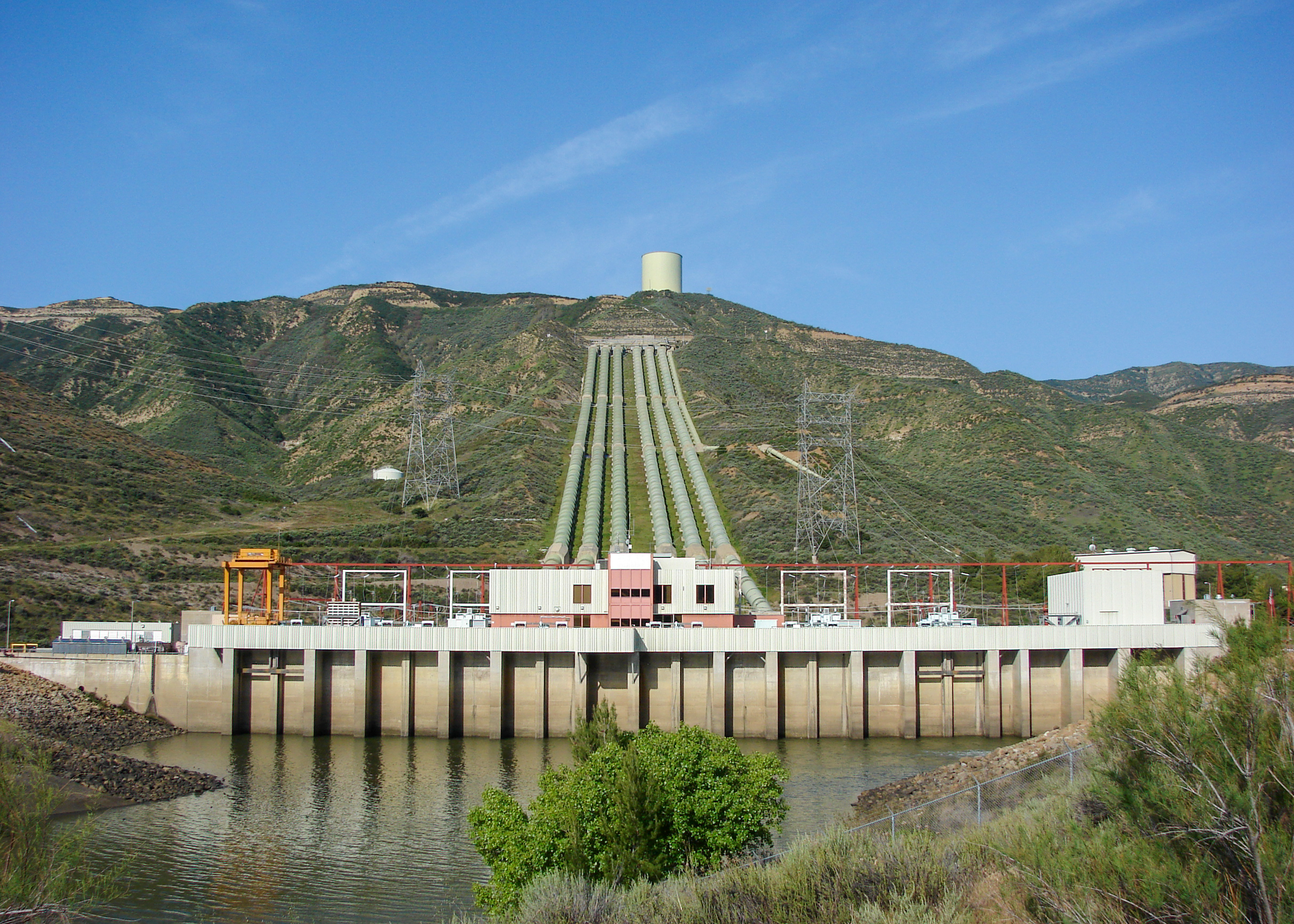
- Front of Castaic Power Plant
- Interactive map of Castaic Power Plant
- Official name: Castaic Power Plant
- Country: United States
- Location: Los Angeles County, California
- Coordinates: 34°35′14.32″N 118°39′23.88″W
- Construction began: 1966
- Opening date: July 11, 1973
- Owners: CDWR, LADWP

Upper reservoir
- Creates: Pyramid Lake
- Total capacity: 186,000 acre⋅ft (229,427,622 m^{3})

Lower reservoir
- Creates: Elderberry Forebay
- Total capacity: 28,400 acre⋅ft (35,030,884 m^{3})

Power Station
- Hydraulic head: 1,060 ft (323 m)
- Turbines: 7
- Pump-generators: 6
- Installed capacity: 1507 MW (nominal); 1247 MW (rated)
- Annual generation: 880,702,000 KWh (gross, 2001–2012); 319,181,000 KWh (net, 2001–2012)

Castaic Power Plant, also known as the Castaic Pumped-Storage Plant, is a seven-unit pumped-storage hydroelectric plant, operated by the Los Angeles Department of Water and Power, which provides peak load power from the falling water on the West Branch of the California State Aqueduct. It is a cooperative venture between the LADWP and the Department of Water Resources of the State of California. An agreement between the two organizations was signed on September 2, 1966, for construction of the project.

== Location ==
The Castaic Power Plant is located about 22 miles (35 km) from the northern Los Angeles city limits at the upper end of the West arm of Castaic Lake.

== Water supply ==
California State Aqueduct water en route to Southern California is pumped up through the Tehachapi Mountains (by the Edmonston Pumping Plant) to the Tehachapi Afterbay. There, the aqueduct divides into the East and West Branches. The West Branch water is again pumped at the Oso Pumping Plant to Quail Lake, near Highway 138 east of Gorman. From here it flows through a permanent pipeline waterway to Warne Power Plant, which is located at the inlet to Pyramid Lake. The Warne Plant was constructed by the state of California in 1983. Pyramid Lake has a surface area of 1,380 acres (560 ha) and a storage capacity of 180,000 acre-feet (220,000,000 m^{3}) with a maximum water surface elevation of 2,578 feet (786 m) above sea level. Pyramid Lake is the upper forebay for the Castaic Power Plant.

== Angeles Tunnel ==
The State of California had planned to build a tunnel 17 feet (5.2 m) in diameter. Under the cooperative development, this tunnel was enlarged to 30 feet (9.1 m) in diameter. The 7.2-mile-long (11.6 km) tunnel, including the penstocks, drops water 1,060 feet (320 m) between Pyramid Lake and the hydroelectric power facilities, and carries over five times the flow previously contemplated for the 17-foot (5.2 m) tunnel.

== Turbines ==
The Castaic Power Plant has six reversible 250-megawatt main units and one conventional 55-megawatt auxiliary unit. By comparison, the largest generators at Hoover Dam are 130 MW. The plant rating is 1,247 MW (Nominal installed capacity is higher (over 1,500 MW); however, when all main units are operating at full load in generating mode, they are de-rated by friction losses from the water flow in the Angeles Tunnel). The 55 MW Unit 7 was placed in service in February 1972. The unit also serves as a pump-starting unit for the six reversible units. The first main unit became operational in 1973. Unit six, the last unit, was placed in service in 1978. Power is generated at 18,000 volts and stepped up to 230,000 volts to be distributed to various receiving substations in Los Angeles. Each of the six 250,000-kilowatt units functions as both a pump and a generator. Each pump has a power input of 240 MW when pumping at a rate of 2,300 cubic feet per second (65 m^{3}/s). The turbines/pumps are used a few percent of the time.

== Surge chamber ==
Visible from Templin Highway and normally mistaken for a water tank, the surge chamber sits at the south end of the Angeles Tunnel. The surge chamber is 120 feet (37 m) in diameter and 400 feet (120 m) high, with 160 feet (49 m) visible above ground. The chamber is there to relieve excess pressure in the tunnel and penstocks if the plant were to experience an emergency shutdown of its generators. It also supplies water for quickly starting the plant's generators while water gains speed in the 7-mile-long (11 km) Angeles Tunnel.

== Castaic Reservoir ==
Water from the Castaic Power Plant is discharged into Elderberry Lake (pumping forebay) from which it can be released into Castaic Lake, created by Castaic Dam. Castaic Lake has a surface area of 2,232 acres (903 ha) and a storage capacity of 324,000 acre-feet (400,000,000 m^{3}), with a normal maximum surface elevation of 1,505 feet (459 m) above sea level. The amount of water in the lake varies with the demand for water delivery from the West Branch of the State Aqueduct.

== Pumped-storage operation ==
The pumping forebay, which is separated from the main reservoir by a dam located downstream from the Castaic Power Plant, functions in connection with the pumped-storage operations of the plant. This assures the availability of at least 10,000 acre-feet (12,000,000 m^{3}) of water that can be pumped back to Pyramid Lake by the use of off-peak energy when economical to do so. The pumping function at Castaic hydroelectric plant provides additional water for power generation beyond the supply of water available from the flow of the State Aqueduct. The City of Los Angeles has need for capacity to meet its peak requirements ranging from 3 to 6 hours per day in the winter to 6 to 10 hours per day in summer, depending upon climatic conditions. The water which normally flows through the West Branch of the State Aqueduct during off peak periods, is stored in the higher-level Pyramid Lake. This water can be channeled through the turbine-generators in a very short time to immediately meet short-time peak demands on the DWP's electric system. If the need exists for power for longer-than-normal peak demand periods, extra water can be pumped back to Pyramid Lake from Elderberry Lake to extend the peaking period.

== In popular culture ==
The exterior scenes of the fictional Ventana Nuclear Power Plant in the film The China Syndrome were filmed at the Castaic Power Plant.
