= Castaic, California =

Census-designated place in California, United States

- Unincorporated community Census designated place
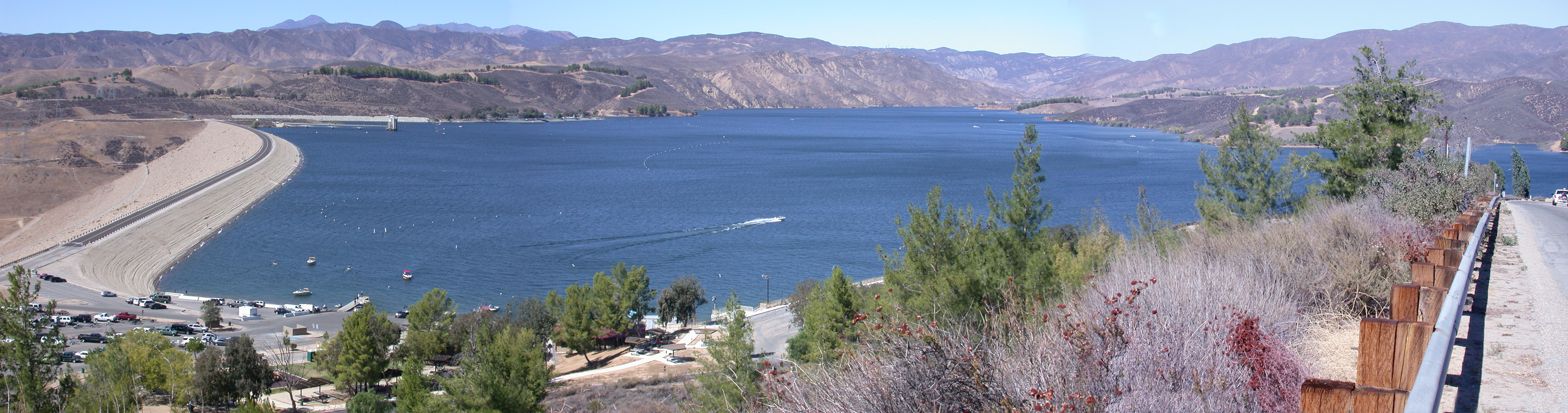
- Castaic Dam and its lake, 2007
- Interactive map of Castaic, California
- Location in Santa Clarita Valley. Castaic (the Los Angeles metropolitan area) Castaic (California)
- Coordinates: 34.49°N 118.62°W
- Country: United States
- State: California
- County: Los Angeles

Area
  - Total: 7.28 sq mi (18.85 km^{2})
  - Land: 7.26 sq mi (18.81 km^{2})
  - Water: 0.015 sq mi (0.04 km^{2}) 0.24%
- Elevation: 1,280 ft (390 m)

Population (2020)
  - Total: 18,937
  - Density: 2,607.8/sq mi (1,006.87/km^{2})
- Time zone: UTC-8 (Pacific (PST))
  - Summer (DST): UTC-7 (PDT)
- ZIP Codes: 91310, 91384
- Area code: 661
- FIPS code: 06-11796
- GNIS feature ID: 2582966
- Website: https://www.castaicca.com/

Castaic (/kəˈsteɪ.ɪk/) (Chumash: Kaštiq; Spanish: Castéc) is an unincorporated community and census-designated place (CDP) in northwestern Los Angeles County, California, United States. As of the 2020 census it had a population of 18,937.

Tens of thousands of motorists pass through Castaic daily as they drive to or from Los Angeles on Interstate 5 (the Golden State Freeway). Castaic Lake is part of the California Water Project and is the site of a hydro-electric power plant. Castaic is 38 miles (61 km) northwest of Los Angeles Union Station and northwest of the city of Santa Clarita.

The Castaic Range War went on for decades in the late 19th and early 20th centuries resulting in dozens of deaths before hostilities ceased in 1916.

== Name ==
The name Castaic is derived from the Chumash word Kaštiq, meaning "the eye". The Spanish and Mexicans later spelt the name in Spanish as Castéc. Castec is first mentioned on old boundary maps of Rancho San Francisco, as a canyon at the trailhead leading to the old Chumash camp at Castac Lake (Tejon Ranch), which is intermittently wet and briny. Early publications in English spelled it Casteque before the current spelling became standardized.

== History ==
The Córdova family of California were the first settlers in the area. Modern Castaic began in 1887 when Southern Pacific set up a railroad siding on the line between Piru and Saugus Station, naming it "Castaic Junction". Between January and April 1890, the Castec School District adopted the new spelling, "Castaic".

=== Range War ===
Between 1890 and 1916, the Castaic Range War was fought in Castaic country over ranch boundaries and grazing rights. It was the biggest range war in U.S. history.

A feud started over Section 23, where the Stonegate subdivision is now. William Chormicle had legally bought the property, but William "Wirt" Jenkins was already storing grain on it and said he had filed for ownership. During a heated dispute, Chormicle and a friend shot and killed two of Jenkins's cowhands. They were acquitted in court.

Jenkins, however, was the local justice of the peace, with friends of his own, and the feud quickly grew into war. Former Los Angeles Rangers (among whom Jenkins had fought) and other notables were drawn in. The war claimed dozens of lives and foiled a negotiator, a forest ranger whom President Theodore Roosevelt had sent in to quell it.

=== Cattle business ===
Castaic has the last traditional cattle roundup—with horses, lariats, and branding irons—in Los Angeles County. It has been held by the Cordova family since 1834, when the family first settled here. Members of the Cordova family were scouts for the U.S. Army during the Mexican War in 1846 and helped identify bodies during the St. Francis Dam disaster in San Francisquito Canyon in 1928. Operations scaled back in 1967 when the government seized around 1,000 acres (400 ha), including the ancestral ranch-house, for the planned Castaic Lake and dam.

== Geography ==
=== Seismology ===
The area is seismically active. On January 3, 2015, a pair of earthquakes of magnitude 3.1 (location: 34.610°N 118.635°W, depth: 5.6 miles (9.0 km)) and 4.2 (location: 34.620°N 118.630°W, depth: 5.5 miles (8.9 km)), respectively, were reported approximately 14 kilometres (8.7 mi) north of Castaic. The epicenter was 16 miles (26 km) from Santa Clarita.

=== Climate ===
This region experiences hot and dry summers, and cool, moderately rainy winters. During the months of June though September, the average high temperature ranges from the 90s F (30s C) to above 100 °F (38 °C). According to the Köppen Climate Classification system, Castaic has a hot-summer Mediterranean climate, abbreviated "Csa" on climate maps.

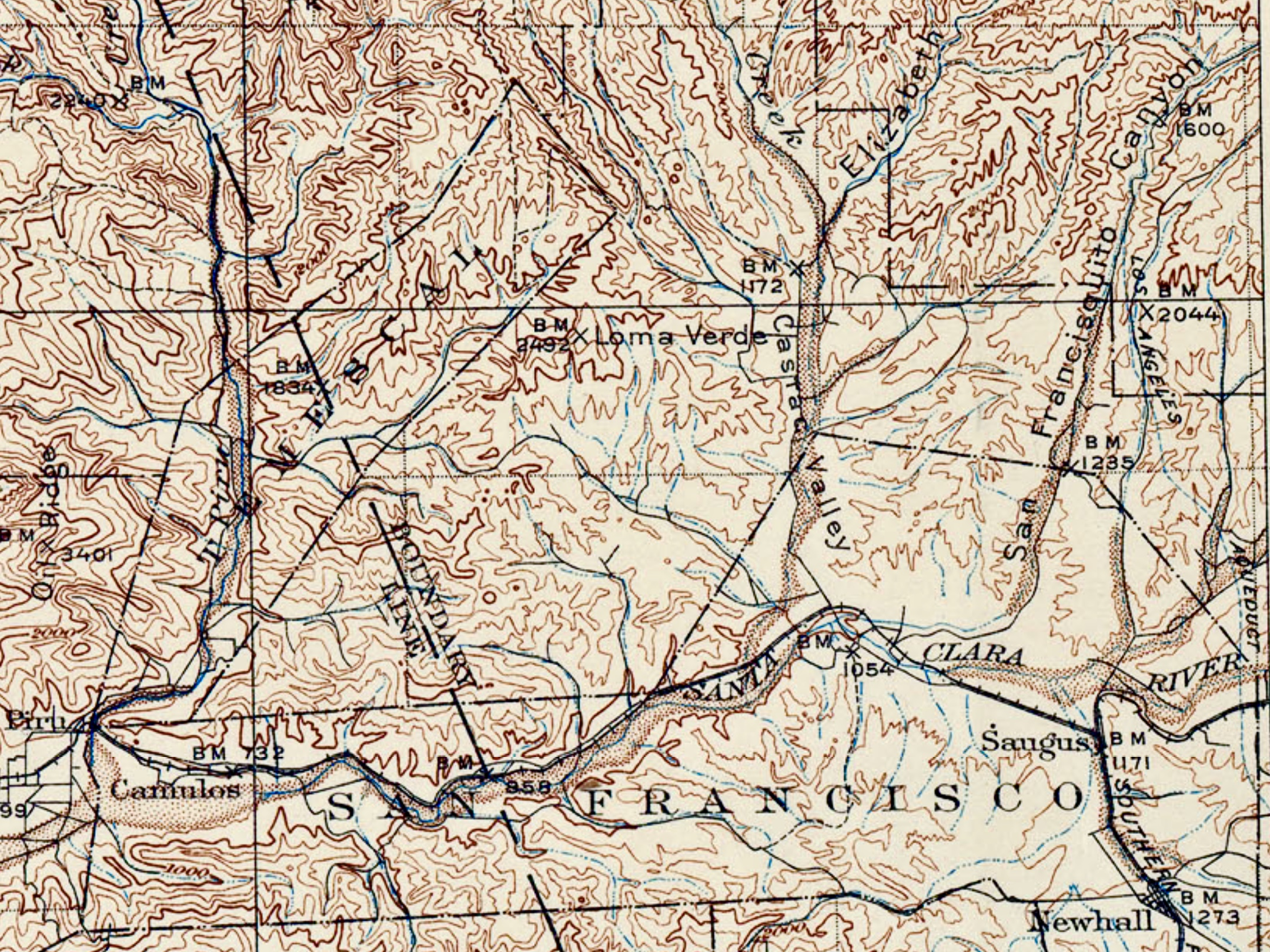
Topography of Castac Valley and Rancho San Francisco

== Demographics ==
Historical population
Census	Pop.	Note	%±
2010	19,015		—
2020	18,937		−0.4%
U.S. Decennial Census; 1860–1870 1880-1890; 1900 1910 1920; 1930 1940 1950; 1960 1970 1980; 1990 2000 2010; 2020

Castaic first appeared as a census designated place in the 2010 U.S. census.

=== Racial and ethnic composition ===
Castaic CDP, California – Racial and ethnic composition Note: the US Census treats Hispanic/Latino as an ethnic category. This table excludes Latinos from the racial categories and assigns them to a separate category. Hispanics/Latinos may be of any race.
Race / Ethnicity (NH = Non-Hispanic)	Pop 2010	Pop 2020	% 2010	% 2020
White alone (NH)	10,864	9,208	57.13%	48.62%
Black or African American alone (NH)	589	600	3.10%	3.17%
Native American or Alaska Native alone (NH)	45	51	0.24%	0.27%
Asian alone (NH)	2,123	2,036	11.16%	10.75%
Native Hawaiian or Pacific Islander alone (NH)	23	27	0.12%	0.14%
Other race alone (NH)	29	151	0.15%	0.80%
Mixed race or Multiracial (NH)	626	978	3.29%	5.16%
Hispanic or Latino (any race)	4,716	5,886	24.80%	31.08%
Total	19,015	18,937	100.00%	100.00%

=== 2020 census ===
As of the 2020 census, Castaic had a population of 18,937 and a population density of 2,607.7 inhabitants per square mile (1,006.8/km^{2}). The census reported that 99.9% of residents lived in households, 0.1% lived in non-institutionalized group quarters, and no one was institutionalized. Overall, 96.5% of residents lived in urban areas and 3.5% lived in rural areas.

The median age was 39.0 years; 23.5% of residents were under the age of 18, 9.6% were between 18 and 24, 23.9% were between 25 and 44, 31.3% were between 45 and 64, and 11.6% were 65 years of age or older. For every 100 females there were 99.8 males, and for every 100 females age 18 and over there were 96.4 males.

There were 6,054 households; 39.2% had children under the age of 18 living in them, 64.7% were married-couple households, 5.5% were cohabiting couple households, 17.3% had a female householder with no partner present, and 12.5% had a male householder with no partner present. About 14.7% of all households were made up of individuals and 5.5% had someone living alone who was 65 years of age or older; the average household size was 3.13. There were 4,859 families (80.3% of all households).

There were 6,130 housing units at an average density of 844.1 units per square mile (325.9 units/km^{2}), of which 6,054 (98.8%) were occupied and 1.2% were vacant. Of the occupied units, 82.5% were owner-occupied and 17.5% were occupied by renters; the homeowner vacancy rate was 0.3% and the rental vacancy rate was 1.9%.

Racial composition as of the 2020 census
Race	Number	Percent
White	10,452	55.2%
Black or African American	633	3.3%
American Indian and Alaska Native	207	1.1%
Asian	2,127	11.2%
Native Hawaiian and Other Pacific Islander	33	0.2%
Some other race	2,330	12.3%
Two or more races	3,155	16.7%
Hispanic or Latino (of any race)	5,886	31.1%

=== Income ===
In 2023, the US Census Bureau estimated that the median household income was $132,153, and the per capita income was $50,338. About 3.8% of families and 4.0% of the population were below the poverty line.

== Education ==
Elementary and middle school students attend schools in the Castaic Union School District. The high school district is William S. Hart Union High School District. High school students attend Castaic High School in the William S. Hart District. Castaic High School first opened in 2019.

== Government and infrastructure ==
In the California State Legislature, Castaic is in the 23rd senatorial district, represented by Republican Suzette Martinez Valladares, and in the 40th Assembly district, represented by Democrat Pilar Schiavo.

In the United States House of Representatives, Castaic is in California's 27th congressional district, represented by Democrat George T. Whitesides.

The Los Angeles County Sheriff's Department (LASD) operates the Santa Clarita Valley Station in Santa Clarita, serving Castaic. Station 149 of the Los Angeles County Fire Department serves the community. The Castaic Area Town Council meets monthly.

Los Angeles County Animal Care Services operates the Santa Clarita Valley/ Castaic Animal Care Center in Castaic.

== Notable people ==
- Stacey Koon, police officer who was found guilty in the Rodney King beating
- Troy Neiman, baseball pitcher
- Trevor Plouffe, baseball player

== In popular culture ==
- The community is featured by Huell Howser in The Bench, Episode 19.

== See also ==
- List of places in California
