= Death of Naya Rivera =

2020 drowning incident

Coordinates: 34°28′39″N 118°45′18″W

On July 8, 2020, American actress and singer Naya Rivera, known for playing Santana Lopez on the television series Glee, was declared missing after she failed to return from a boating excursion on Lake Piru near her home in California. Shortly afterwards, her rented boat with her unharmed four-year-old son Josey Hollis Dorsey was located. A search conducted by various authorities in southern California began, though Rivera was formally presumed dead the next day; the search lasted until the morning of July 13, 2020, when her body was recovered and she was pronounced dead from drowning at the age of 33. The death was ruled accidental, with the investigation determining Rivera exhausted herself saving her son's life in the water. In November 2020, Rivera's ex-husband, Ryan Dorsey, and estate brought wrongful death lawsuits against Ventura County and the management of Lake Piru. The public manner of the search contributed to extensive media attention on developments before and after she was found.

== Background ==
Rivera was a strong swimmer. She had vertigo that could become worse when swimming, but had previously been treated for the condition at Cedars-Sinai Medical Center and managed it with appropriate medication. Rivera was an experienced boater, taking similar trips from a young age. In a 2017 interview, Rivera had mentioned a scary experience on one such trip, when the anchor of her family's boat got stuck and her father injured himself on the propeller trying to free it.

The Lake Piru Recreation Area was closed to the public for much of 2020, with the closure starting before April 4 because of the COVID-19 pandemic and lasting until it reopened on July 1. Rivera had been visiting Lake Piru for years by the time of her death and is said to have considered it a sanctuary.

== Drowning ==
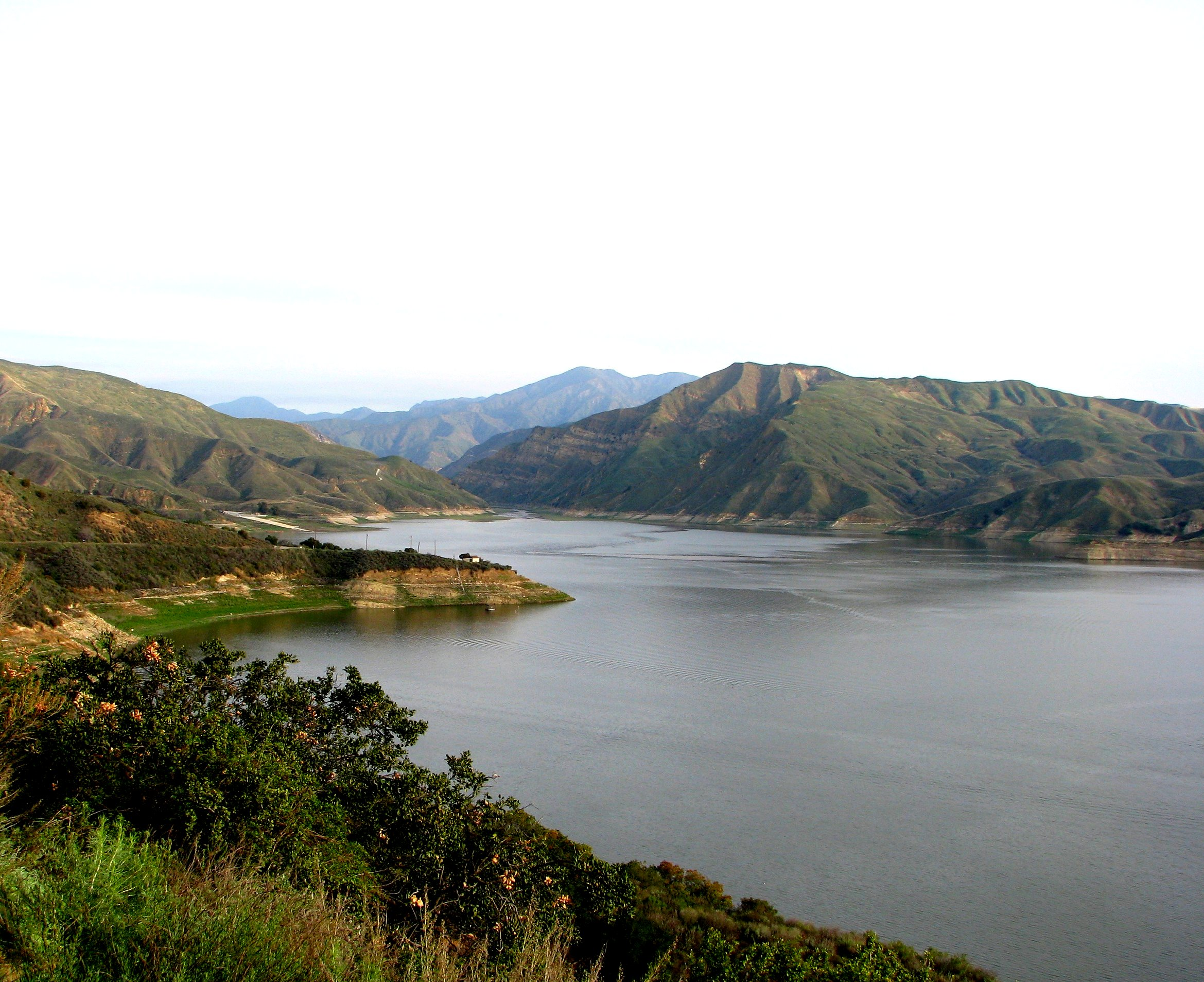
Lake Piru, facing to the north, photographed in 2009.

Rivera's mother, Yolanda Previtire, said that Rivera and her four-year-old son, Josey Hollis Dorsey, were planning a barbecue by Lake Piru on July 8, 2020, before deciding to rent a boat when they arrived. They left the dock at about 1:00 p.m. PDT, and were expected back at 4:00 p.m., three hours after they left the dock. When they did not return, a search began. Josey was found at around 5:00 p.m., alone and asleep on the boat wearing a life jacket. He was found in the Narrows, an area at the north of the lake that can be quite deep and windy. When interviewed by the Ventura County Sheriff's Office, Josey told investigators that he and Rivera had jumped off the boat into the lake together and swam briefly, but his mother quickly told him to get back onto the boat. The boat had begun to drift and rock violently while they were in the water because of the wind, which Ryan Dorsey's lawsuit says reached speeds of up to 21 mph (34 km/h) that afternoon. Police reports state that Josey had recalled that Rivera helped him climb back into the boat but was unable to climb back onboard herself and then disappeared underwater, while the lawsuit claims that Josey climbed aboard unaided while his mother struggled to do the same. Both accounts state that Josey watched his mother reaching up and calling out for help; he searched for a rope on the boat to help while she was struggling. He also stated that she was not wearing a life jacket.

The Ventura County sheriff suggested that Rivera and Josey likely found themselves caught in a rip current – these can be common in the area of the lake they were in, especially during the afternoon – and struggled to get back to the boat, which was found unanchored and so may have drifted from where they entered the water. He concluded that Rivera likely "mustered enough energy to save her son, but not enough to save herself", noting how Josey described being pushed back onto the boat by his mother.

== Search and recovery ==
After Josey was found, a 9-1-1 call was made and a formal search and rescue operation was launched. The boat was searched and an adult life jacket was found on board, along with Rivera's identification. Rivera's vehicle, a black Mercedes G-Class, was found in the parking lot by the dock.

The sheriff's office suspended the search and rescue operation that evening and resumed again the following day. The lake was closed to the public, with dive teams from across the region taking part in the search. On July 9, the sheriff's department confirmed to NBC that Rivera was presumed dead and that rescue efforts would now shift to recovery efforts: on the first day of the search, efforts had been made on land to determine if Rivera had made it out of the lake; a lack of evidence and Josey's testimony led them to change the search to recovery. They also released CCTV footage of Rivera and her son arriving in the parking lot and leaving the dock on the boat. On July 10, the number of divers involved was cut from around 100 to around 40. The sheriff's department explained that the visibility was so poor it was more probable Rivera would be found by using sonar devices. As well as dive teams and sonar, sniffer dogs were taken out on the lake.

On July 11 and 12, Rivera's parents and stepfather, brother Mychal Rivera, ex-husband Ryan Dorsey and close friend and Glee co-star Heather Morris joined the search team at the lake. Morris had wanted to conduct her own search around the shoreline, and was in contact with the sheriff's captain in charge of the search, Eric Buschow, whom she already knew, several times. The sheriff's office dissuaded more civilians from trying to search because of dangerous terrain. They restated that they were searching on land as well as in the lake. On July 11, the sheriff's office had announced that other counties and a private contractor were assisting with the search.

On July 13, it was announced that a body had been found floating in Lake Piru by divers when the search resumed in the morning, at around 9:30 a.m.; the body was confirmed to be Rivera's at a press conference held later that day. Buschow told the media that the body had been found just north of Diablo Cove, and the sheriff's office stated that it was likely the body had been trapped in vegetation underwater before resurfacing. Rivera was officially declared dead on July 13, which is reflected on her death certificate, though this document does state that she died "within minutes".

On July 14, the Ventura County medical examiner released an autopsy report stating that the cause of death was an accidental drowning and that there was no evidence of injury or intoxication. The complete toxicology report was made public on September 11, 2020. It said that small amounts of prescription medications for ADHD and anxiety – amphetamine and diazepam – were found in Rivera's system, as well as caffeine. She also had a negligible blood alcohol content at the time of her death. The autopsy concluded that none of these factors led to intoxication or contributed to her death.

=== Public response to disappearance ===
Fans of Rivera posted messages of support during the time of her disappearance, though some expressed frustration on social media as the sheriff's office repeatedly asked fans not to attempt to search themselves in the land around the shore of Lake Piru; while Morris had initially suggested she would do this, she also joined the authorities in asking civilians to keep away, as they may get into difficulty in the rural terrain and need rescuing themselves. Shortly after Rivera's disappearance was reported, a petition was started by fans to have signs warning of the danger of swimming erected at Lake Piru.

Another Glee actress, Lea Michele, deleted her Twitter account during Rivera's disappearance after becoming a target for internet trolls. While many of the show's actors had stayed close after it ended in 2015 and had posted on social media with prayers for her safe rescue, Michele had stayed silent. In May and June 2020, Michele had been the subject of backlash as many of her co-stars accused her of unpleasant and even racist behavior on set, and she had been absent on social media after this. In previous years, Rivera had personally spoken out against Michele, saying she was difficult and that they were not on speaking terms by the end of the show's run, but said that they did not have any "beef". Michele reportedly received death threats for her silence.

== Funeral ==
Rivera was interred at the Forest Lawn Memorial Park in Hollywood Hills, Hollywood, following a private service attended by family and close friends, including members of the Glee cast, on July 24, 2020.

== Lawsuit ==
In November 2020, Ryan Dorsey, on behalf of Josey, and Rivera's estate, brought wrongful death lawsuits against Ventura County and the management of Lake Piru. The suit claims that there were no signs to warn of the dangers of the lake and of swimming in the lake, and that the rental boat provided to Rivera did not meet safety standards under California law, specifically that it did not come equipped with flotation devices, nor "with a safely accessible ladder, adequate rope, an anchor, a radio, or any security mechanisms to prevent swimmers from being separated from their boats". The lawsuit also pursued survivor's claims for Josey and claims of negligent emotional distress, stating that "Rivera may not have known that her son had made it to the boat but she surely knew that she was dying and would not make it back to her son", and highlighted the later publication of toxicology reports, which it said were the defendants' "attempts to discredit [Rivera] in the media and distract from their own negligence".

In February 2022, People Magazine reported that the lawsuit brought on by Ryan Dorsey was settled. The terms of the settlement were not made public, but the family stated that the money awarded would be used to help raise her child.

== Responses ==
In end-of-year reports for 2020, Rivera's death was widely covered in the media. Mitú noted that she was the eighth most-searched topic on Google, writing that "in a year of catastrophic loss, [...] the tragic loss of Naya Rivera [...] seems to have struck a major chord among all of us", and news outlets in Australasia described the drowning as the "most chilling celebrity death" of the year. Insider listed a photograph of Glee cast members holding hands along the shore of Lake Piru on July 13 as one of the most powerful images of 2020.

=== Public figures ===
Fans of Rivera shared tributes after she was found dead. Her family thanked them for the "outpouring of love" in a message shared on July 15. On July 13, Rivera's boyfriend, soccer player Jermaine Jones made an Instagram post expressing his grief while focusing on Rivera's love for her son, and her ex-fiancé, Big Sean, wrote a post on July 19 saying she was "a hero", referring to saving her son and the representation she gave for many. Her ex-husband Ryan Dorsey made no public statement until after Rivera's funeral, when he posted on Instagram to say that he was still finding her death hard to believe, but that having their son makes coping easier "because a part of [Rivera] will always be with [him]", promising to raise their son knowing who his mother was. Other reactions from public figures included prominent politicians Alexandria Ocasio-Cortez and Kamala Harris, who noted her profound impact in creating intersectional representation on primetime television; Demi Lovato, who played the girlfriend of Rivera's character on Glee in its fifth season, expressed similar sentiments, writing: "The character you played was groundbreaking for tons of closeted (at the time) queer girls like me and your ambition and accomplishments were inspiring to Latina women all over the world". Tributes came from performers across music, television, film, and theatre.

=== Glee ===
Rivera's many Glee co-stars, a group of whom had gathered at the lake on July 13 to say prayers shortly before her body was found, also paid tribute. Jane Lynch was one of the first to react after her death, tweeting "Rest sweet, Naya. What a force you were"; several other members of the cast also described her as "a force". The show's creators, Ryan Murphy, Ian Brennan, and Brad Falchuk, announced that they planned to start a college fund for Rivera's son. Heather Morris posted photos of their sons together, calling Rivera a "consistent and loving friend" who was the "strongest and most resilient human being [she knew]", and shared a video of herself dancing to Rivera's song "Radio Silence" in tribute.

The media noted that Rivera's body was found on the anniversary of the death of her co-star and friend, Cory Monteith seven years earlier; a tribute she had sung for him, the song "If I Die Young", saw a surge of views. Lea Michele posted black-and-white images of Monteith and Rivera on Instagram to remember both of the actors, while Max Adler tweeted "Hey, July 13th" followed by a middle finger emoji, and John Lock tweeted "today of all the days", as reactions to the deaths of their co-stars. Another member of the cast, Kevin McHale, tweeted that "[he is] not religious by any means, but you'd be hard-pressed to convince [him] that Cory didn't help find our girl [Rivera] today". Monteith's mother, Ann McGregor, also posted a lengthy tribute, writing how much Rivera's friendship had meant to her son and their family and saying: "We'll carry you in our hearts forever. We miss you. Friends reunited for eternity". In 2022, Dianna Agron, remembered Rivera on a podcast by saying she and her late co-star “instilled each other with confidence”, as Rivera was her first ever friend on set.

=== Rivera's work ===
Rivera had a lead role in the television series Step Up, which was renewed for a third season and moved network to Starz in May 2020; Rivera was announced to be continuing her role as the season went into production. With Rivera's death, the season was set to be rewritten. In the two weeks following her death, the single "Supermassive Black Hole", a 2012 track by 2Cellos featuring Naya Rivera, appeared in the charts; it reached number 16 on the iTunes Top 100 Classical chart in the week of July 13 to July 19, 2020, dropping to number 81 the week after.

In February 2020, shortly before filming was shut down, Rivera recorded a guest spot in an episode of the Netflix show Sugar Rush, to be released on July 31, 2020. Following her death shortly before this date, Netflix entered discussions with Rivera's family and manager about releasing the episode; it was announced on the day before the season's release that it would be airing as planned, with the episode dedicated to her. She made a second and final posthumous appearance in November 2020, in an episode of The Eric Andre Show. Eric Andre told IndieWire that, though the show had said they would never release the long cuts of celebrity interviews, "[they] almost did put an extended interview up this year [...] with Naya Rivera because she had so many funny gags in her interview that [they] couldn't cram in the episode's time. [They] were gonna put it out but then she passed away and [they] didn't want it to feel like [they] were exploiting her death or anything dark or weird for marketing."

The first part of the 2021 animated film Batman: The Long Halloween, in which Rivera posthumously voiced Selina Kyle / Catwoman, was dedicated in her memory.

=== Lake Piru ===
Lake Piru remained closed to the public for over a month after Rivera's death. It planned to reopen on August 17, 2020, but the Holser Fire between the town of Piru and the reservoir prevented access and the lake remained closed until August 20. While it reopened for fishing and boating, swimming at the reservoir is now prohibited. However, four years after Rivera's death, a man from North Carolina drowned at Lake Piru after experiencing a medical emergency.

=== Tributes ===
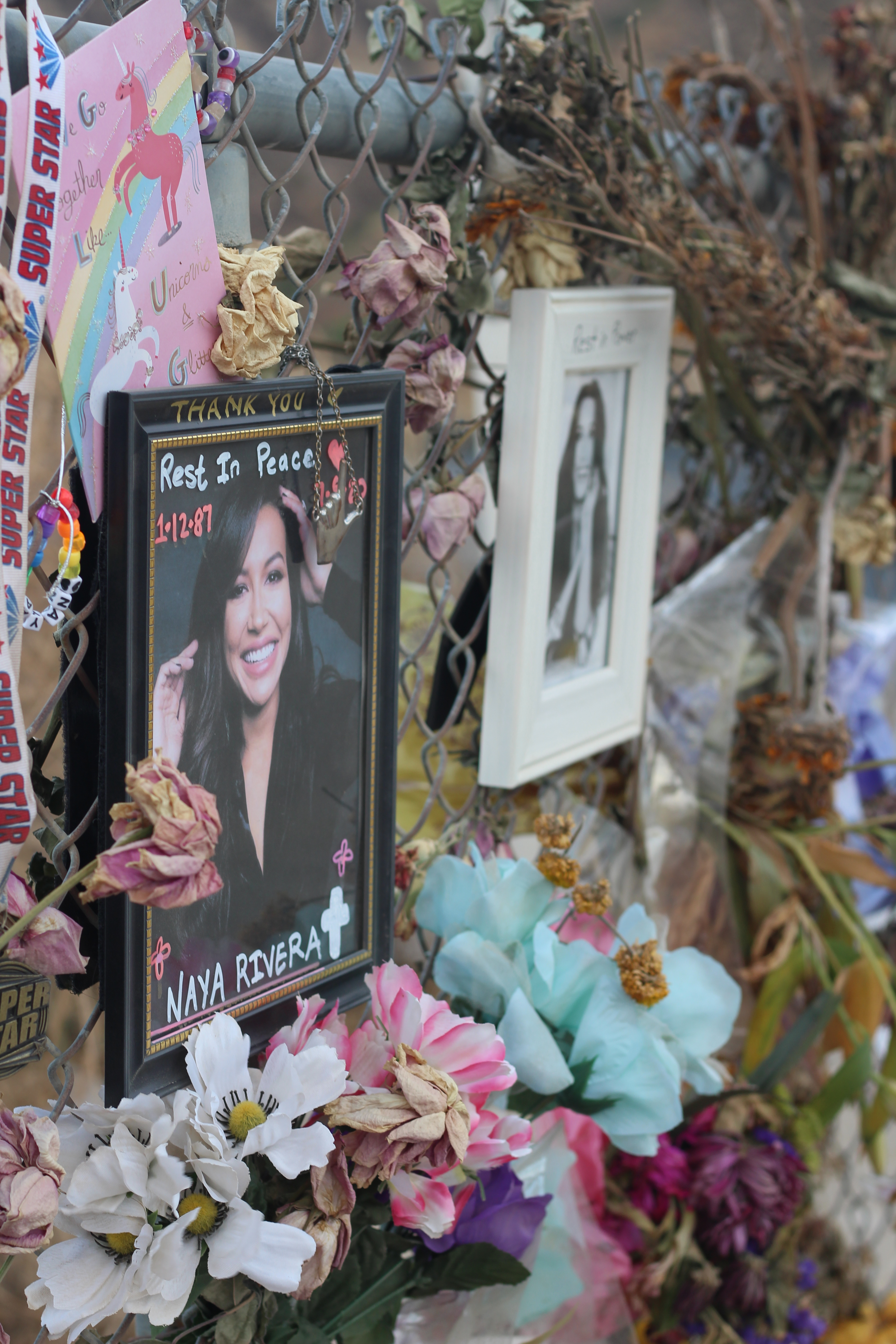
Naya Rivera Memorial at Lake Piru

A memorial to Rivera was constructed under the Lake Piru sign in the days after her death. In late July 2020, Filipino director Drama Del Rosario thanked Rivera and her representation in his acceptance speech for the Jury Prize at the PBS Short Film Festival; his winning film looked at how his family came to accept his sexuality when he was outed in high school, with Rivera's Glee character Santana Lopez helping them understand, and he said "[she] is a testament to how much queer entertainment can change the life of a family on the other side of the world". Chris Colfer guest wrote an article for Variety eulogizing her. To honor Rivera, the Gay Emmys replaced its Best Coming Out Story award with the Santana Lopez Legacy Award For Outstanding Queer Teen Character, beginning with the 2020 event.

Singer and Glee co-star Amber Riley performed a tribute to Rivera on the August 27, 2020 episode of Jimmy Kimmel Live!; guest host Lil Rel Howery, another friend of the late actress, organized the tribute when a musical guest dropped out, inviting Riley instead. The performance, broadcast in black-and-white, included a montage of images from Rivera's life provided by her mother. Rivera was featured in the In Memoriam segment at the 72nd Primetime Emmy Awards, appearing with Regis Philbin at the beginning of the montage, and, despite not being primarily associated with music in 2020, she was similarly remembered at the 2020 MTV Video Music Awards, appearing along with Chadwick Boseman at the end of the montage. When Boseman died in August 2020, his death was likened to other unexpected deaths of young black celebrities in 2020, particularly Kobe Bryant and Rivera; the Associated Press and Clarín noted Rivera and Boseman as Hollywood's most impactful 2020 deaths. On April 8, 2021, at the 32nd GLAAD Media Awards, several Glee cast members honored Rivera in a tribute introduced by Lovato.

== See also ==
- Lists of solved missing person cases
