= Antimony Peak =

Peak located in Kern County, California

- Antimony Peak (top center)

Highest point
- Elevation: 6,851 ft (2,088 m) NAVD 88
- Prominence: 888 ft (271 m)
- Listing: Hundred Peaks Section
- Coordinates: 34°52′37″N 119°06′44″W

Geography
- Location within California Location within the United States
- Location: Kern County, California, U.S.
- Parent range: San Emigdio Mountains
- Topo map: USGS Pleito Hills

Climbing
- Easiest route: Hike, class 1

Antimony Peak is a steep peak of quartz diorite located in southern Kern County, in the San Emigdio Mountains of the Transverse Ranges of California. It is the taller one of two summits with that name in Kern County. The second Antimony Peak is in the Sierra Nevada Mountains; a third Antimony Peak, the shortest of the three, is in the Diablo Range on the boundary of San Benito County and Merced County, California. All three of these peaks are in California, and no other mountains have this name in the United States.

The land is administered by the Los Padres National Forest. It was named in 1854 by W. P. Blake, a Pacific Railroad surveyor, after he identified a suspected vein of silver ore on the mountain as being the metalloid antimony.

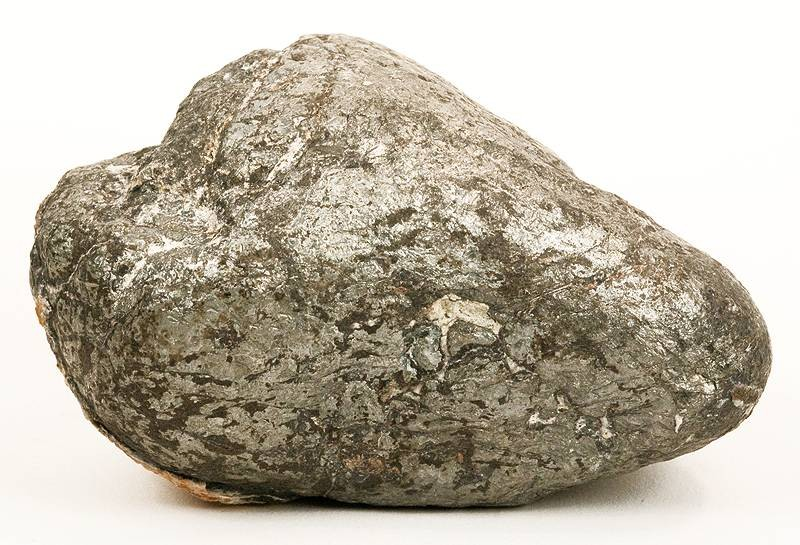
Antimony specimen from Antimony Peak
