= French Ranch, San Benito County, California =

Coordinates: 36°56′48″N 121°14′17″W

French Ranch is a locale northeast of Hollister in the Diablo Range, in San Benito County, California. It lies on a flat just south of Wildcat Canyon at an elevation of 1,821 feet (555 meters) at the foot of Frenchs Pass. It lies west of an unnamed stream that descends northward to its confluence with Wildcat Canyon Creek from the north slope of Antimony Peak.

== History ==
Before the ranch existed, in the early 1850s, the nearby spring was called Aguaje Caballo Blanco (White Horse Watering place), for a broken down white horse that frequented the area during the time Joaquin Murrieta and his gang used La Vereda del Monte here where they rested and watered the droves of wild and stolen horses they drove through here before crossing over the Diablo Range divide at what later became known as Frenchs Pass on their way south to their depot and ranch at Cantua Creek and ultimately to Sonora.
