= Hines Peak =

Mountain in California, United States

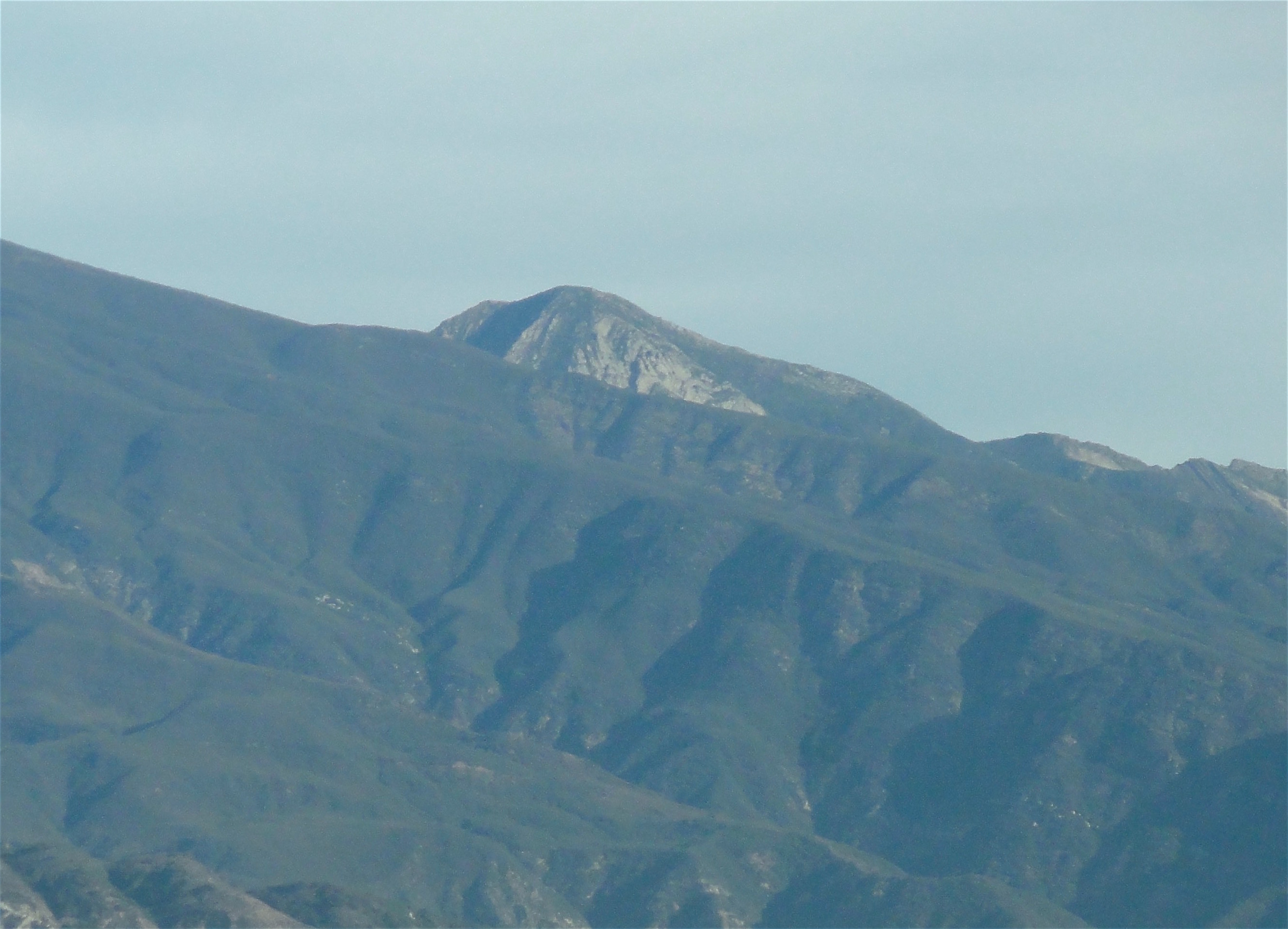
- View from just west of Santa Paula.

Highest point
- Elevation: 6,703 ft (2,043 m)
- Listing: Sierra Club Hundred Peaks Section
- Coordinates: 34°30′39″N 119°04′32″W

Geography
- Location: Ventura County California, U.S.
- Parent range: Topatopa Mountains; Transverse Ranges
- Topo map: USGS Hines Peak

Climbing
- Easiest route: Hike

Hines Peak is a mountain of the Topatopa Mountains, in Ventura County, California, at an elevation of 6,703 feet (2,043 m). It is the second highest peak of the Topatopa Mountains after Cobblestone Mountain.

It is located within the Ventura County section of Los Padres National Forest, several miles northeast of Santa Paula. Snow falls on the mountain during the winter months.

== See also ==
- Topatopa Mountains
- Los Padres National Forest
- Transverse Ranges
- Cobblestone Mountain
