= Brush Mountain (Kern County, California) =

Mountain in Kern County, California

- Location within California Location within the United States

Highest point
- Elevation: 7,051 ft (2,149 m) NAVD 88
- Prominence: 368 ft (112 m)
- Listing: Hundred Peaks Section
- Coordinates: 34°53′04″N 119°13′29″W

Geography
- Location: Kern County, California, U.S.
- Parent range: San Emigdio Mountains
- Topo map: USGS Eagle Rest Peak

Climbing
- Easiest route: Hike, class 1

Brush Mountain is located in Southern California's Kern County, a little north of Ventura County. It's located in the Los Padres National Forest, a few miles west northwest of San Emigdio Mountain.
