= Chief Tecuya =

Emigdiano Chumash elder

Chief Tecuya was an Emigdiano Chumash elder said to be the last living soul to have known the precise whereabouts of an exposed gold ledge that spawned the legend of the Lost Padre Mine.

== Alternative spelling ==
While Tecuya is the most common spelling, variations in spelling have been used including Tucoya (Graham) and Tecoya (Miller).

== Key reference ==
An Indian chief named Tecuya was a central figure in a series of newspaper articles published by W. J. Graham in 1915. The series was entitled "The Lost Padre Mine or The Mystery of Tejon" edited by Frederick Q. Tredway, the newspaper's "city editor". Tredway also played a role in shaping these stories through editorial comment. According to Graham, the story he committed to paper was from the Native American story-telling tradition (oral history).

A version of this same tale was published 13 years earlier in the San Francisco Chronicle in 1902. The source of the story was attributed to Graham by the author Flora Haines Loughead.

== Biography ==
William John Graham was born 13 November 1859 at Carson Hill, County of Calaveras, California, from parents that had immigrated from Ireland. William was a blacksmith by trade who worked in Bakersfield, CA, for a number of years. In 1888 Graham was elected Sheriff of Kern County running on a Democratic ticket. He served one, two-year term as sheriff from April 1889 to April 1891.

He was twice married, firstly to Agnes Sullivan on 11 April 1878. His second marriage was c.1904 to Julia Elizabeth Hinkson (1874-1964).

Around the turn of the century, Graham turned his attention to gold mining in Tuolumne County. "W. J. Graham, superintendent of the Duleek mine near Sonora, is arranging to add new machinery to the plant and will run a tunnel 4000 feet in length to tap the ledge at a depth of 800 feet." The Duleek gold mine was in Groveland, Big Oak Flat District, East Belt area, in Tuolumne County.

Graham died at age 74 on 3 January 1934, Eugene, Lane, Oregon.

== Legend ==
Graham told the story of an exposed gold ledge where pure gold could be simply picked up from the ground. He claimed his story came from the Native American oral-history or story-telling tradition before the recording of written history in that part of California. Tecuya's father told him of Jesuit priests who had come to their village in San Emigdio Canyon from across the Colorado River.

Several priests lived among the Indians and built smelters for processing ore. Every year they loaded a mule train with processed gold and silver recovered in the area which they exported across the Colorado River. One of these annual expeditions was attacked by Paiute Indians and two priests were killed. In an ensuing inter-tribal battle that started at the Canebrake (Battle of the Canebrake), three remaining priests also lost their lives. Their deaths put an end to the export of precious metals by these mission fathers.

Some years later another priest arrived at Tecuya's village. This time it was a priest from the Dominican or Franciscan Order. He came alone with a smaller mule train of 13 animals. Every year for eleven consecutive years, this priest exported gold that he had recovered single-handedly from a secret location in the surrounding mountains. On his last trip, the priest revealed the gold ledge to the young Tecuya making him the life-long guardian of the gold field. Tecuya was sworn to keep the location an absolute secret. A padre's curse was placed on the site with serious consequences, including death, for any interlopers. Native Americans in particular took these curses very seriously.

== Other authors ==
A number of authors have repeated the stories introduced by Graham in partnership with the newspaper man, Tredway. Examples of authors who published versions of Graham's stories include Virginia Wegis, Thelma B. Miller, Harry Earl Rieseberg, Clarence Cullimore, Jerry Reynolds, and Annie Rose Briggs.

Using a different spelling for Tecuya's name, the author, Thelma B. Miller, wrote about Tecoya and his father, also named Tecoya, in her book "History of Kern County, California" published in 1929. Thelma Miller's account closely parallels the William J. Graham story and therefore her account appears to be entirely derivative rather than being based on independent corroborative sources.

Virginia Wegis published a series of stories for their intrigue and entertainment value Her stories paraphrased what Graham had published in 1915.

The architect, Clarence Cullimore, also refers to Tucoya in his booklet, "Old Adobes of Forgotten Fort Tejon" but acknowledges William J. Graham as the source.

== Geographical nomenclature ==
A mountain, a ridge, a canyon, and a creek are all named after Tecuya. Tecuya Mountain (7,163 feet) is the highest point on the Tecuya Ridge section of the San Emigdio Mountain range bordering Cuddy Valley in southern Kern County. Tecuya Mountain is the headwaters of Tecuya Creek that flows north through Tecuya Canyon. The name Tecuya first appeared on U.S. Geological Survey (USGS) maps in 1904.

Rather than being named after a person, these geographical features were named after a Native American tribe which was a sub grouping known as the Tecuya Chumash.

== Origin of name ==
The origin of the geographical name Tecuya is thought to be derived from the Indian word, Tokya, which is the name the Yokuts Indians used when referring to the neighboring Chumash peoples. The origin of that name is probably the Yokuts word thoxil meaning "west". In other words, a descriptive name for their western neighbors, or tribe to the west.

In an expedition in 1806, the diarist Father José María Zalvidea visited the Indian ranchería (village) named Taku'y/Tacui. The report mentioned 23 inhabitants who were living in this village near what later became known as Tecuya Creek. Father Zalvidea baptized two old men there that he named Fernando and Ramon. Taku'y/Tacui could be a Spanish transliteration of the word, Tokya, so this is another possibility for the origin of the name Tecuya.

The inland Chumash welcomed many coastal Chumash refugees fleeing Mexican-era oppression including a large migration of Kagismuwas Chumash who vacated the area of the current-day Vandenberg Air Force Base to take up residency in Tecuya Canyon.

== Death ==
At the end of the nineteenth century, Tecuya was said to be one of the last of the full-blood, tribal elders remaining on what used to be the Sebastian Indian Reservation better known as the Tejon Indian Reservation (1853-1864). He lived in an isolated hut about eight miles from the ranch headquarters. Tecuya reportedly died on Tejon Ranch in 1898. He was thought to be around 100-years old at the time of his passing.

== Tashlipun ==
The name of the Chumash village in the mouth of San Emigdio Canyon was Tashlipun (pronounced Tash-lé-poon). The Graham/Tredway legend asserts that the chief of Tashlipun in the early 1800s was Tecuya. However, records clearly show the chief at that time was Andrés Uichojo who was baptized by Mission Santa Bárbara in 1818 when he was age 55. Most of the members of his village were baptized at the same time.

== Validity ==
An elderly Indian named Tecuya was never mentioned in any of the studies made about Tejon Indian history covering the late nineteenth century. This includes John P. Harrington ethnographic and linguistic fieldwork at Tejon. Nor is anything found in the original notebooks of C. Hart Merriam, Alfred Kroeber, and Frank Forrest Latta from their research at Tejon. Both Harrington and Latta interviewed Bill Skinner, who Graham alleges was a close blood relative of Tecuya, yet Skinner never mentions any person with this name.

The absence of independent references to an Indian named Tecuya undermines the validity of William J. Graham's stories. Tecuya, therefore, appears to be a fictional character created to drive a story about a fabulously rich gold field in southern California's early history.

It is reasonable to conclude Tecuya is not a real person but rather is an imaginary protagonist in a lost-mine legend. It appears Tecuya only exists as a larger-than-life character in folklore.
