= Eagle Rest Peak =

Mountain in California, United States

- Location within California

Highest point
- Elevation: 6,008 ft (1,831 m) NAVD 88
- Prominence: 968 ft (295 m)
- Listing: Hundred Peaks Section
- Coordinates: 34°54′27″N 119°08′01″W

Geography
- Location: Kern County, California, U.S.
- Parent range: San Emigdio Mountains
- Topo map: USGS Eagle Rest Peak

Climbing
- Easiest route: Scramble, mostly class 2 with a class 3 summit block

Eagle Rest Peak is a remote peak in the San Emigdio Mountains, located in southern Kern County, California, 12 miles (19 km) west of the settlement of Grapevine and Interstate 5.

== Wind Wolves Preserve ==
The mountain is in the Wind Wolves Preserve, owned by The Wildlands Conservancy.
