= Brush Mountain =

Brush Mountain may refer to:

== United States ==
The USGS Geographical Names Information System lists 35 summits, including:

| Name | USGS link | State | County | USGS map | Coordinates | Elevation | |
|---|---|---|---|---|---|---|---|
| Brush Mountain | | Alabama | Madison | Meridianville | 34°48′04″N 086°33′31″W | 935 ft | 285 m |
| Brush Mountain | | Arkansas | Carroll | Eureka Springs | 36°27′09″N 093°39′11″W | 1,486 ft | 453 m |
| Brush Mountain | | Arizona | Navajo | Oak Creek Ranch | 34°00′05″N 110°39′38″W | 5,620 ft | 1,710 m |
| Brush Mountain | | California | Santa Clara | Isabel Valley | 37°17′56″N 121°31′56″W | 2,861 ft | 872 m |
| Brush Mountain | | California | Mendocino | Sherwood Peak | 39°34′50″N 123°30′17″W | 3,097 ft | 944 m |
| Brush Mountain | | California | Mendocino | Tan Oak Park | 39°47′45″N 123°37′10″W | 3,494 ft | 1,065 m |
| Brush Mountain | | California | Humboldt | Willow Creek | 40°54′53″N 123°40′07″W | 3,937 ft | 1,200 m |
| Brush Mountain | | California | Tehama | Riley Ridge | 39°59′00″N 122°39′35″W | 3,448 ft | 1,051 m |
| Brush Mountain | | California | Shasta | Cassel | 40°55′42″N 121°35′09″W | 3,743 ft | 1,141 m |
| Brush Mountain | | California | Kern | Eagle Rest Peak | 34°53′04″N 119°13′29″W | 7,050 ft | 2,150 m |
| Brush Mountain | | California | Trinity | Four Corners Rock | 40°01′57″N 123°14′11″W | 4,216 ft | 1,285 m |
| Brush Mountain | | Colorado | Routt | Tumble Mountain | 40°52′37″N 107°14′59″W | 9,741 ft | 2,969 m |
| Brush Mountain | | Colorado | Mesa | Snipe Mountain | 38°37′23″N 108°33′02″W | 8,907 ft | 2,715 m |
| Brush Mountain | | Colorado | Rio Blanco | Razorback Ridge | 39°38′55″N 108°36′39″W | 8,861 ft | 2,701 m |
| Brush Mountain | | Idaho | Adams | Railroad Saddle | 45°07′08″N 116°24′27″W | 6,004 ft | 1,830 m |
| Brush Mountain | | Kentucky | Bell | Varilla | 36°39′34″N 083°34′00″W | 3,130 ft | 950 m |
| Brush Mountain | | Kentucky | Knox | Kayjay | 36°42′44″N 083°51′09″W | 1,585 ft | 483 m |
| Brush Mountain | | Massachusetts | Franklin | Northfield | 42°40′30″N 072°25′58″W | 889 ft | 271 m |
| Brush Mountain | | Maine | Oxford | Roxbury | 44°42′14″N 070°34′29″W | 2,428 ft | 740 m |
| Brush Mountain | | Montana | Lincoln | Horse Mountain | 48°13′26″N 115°23′08″W | 5,846 ft | 1,782 m |
| Brush Mountain | | Montana | Sheridan | Brush Mountain | 48°28′26″N 104°05′02″W | 2,205 ft | 672 m |
| Brush Mountain | | North Carolina | Randolph | Eleazer | 35°36′38″N 079°55′35″W | 810 ft | 250 m |
| Brush Mountain | | North Carolina | Rockingham | Mayodan | 36°28′42″N 079°58′05″W | 797 ft | 243 m |
| Brush Mountain | | New York | Hamilton | Lake Pleasant | 43°25′10″N 074°27′07″W | 2,165 ft | 660 m |
| Brush Mountain | | Oregon | Lane | Cottage Grove Lake | 43°40′58″N 123°00′10″W | 2,310 ft | 700 m |
| Brush Mountain | | Oregon | Jackson | Brown Mountain | 42°15′02″N 122°19′09″W | 6,106 ft | 1,861 m |
| Brush Mountain | | Pennsylvania | Blair | Bellwood | 40°32′02″N 078°18′46″W | 2,408 ft | 734 m |
| Brush Mountain | | Pennsylvania | Centre | Millheim | 40°56′34″N 077°23′13″W | 1,936 ft | 590 m |
| Brush Mountain | | Tennessee | Monroe | Whiteoak Flats | 35°22′31″N 084°02′43″W | 3,996 ft | 1,218 m |
| Brush Mountain | | Virginia | Albemarle | Schuyler | 37°51′57″N 078°41′47″W | 1,772 ft | 540 m |
| Brush Mountain | | Virginia | Warren | Bentonville | 38°48′53″N 078°19′15″W | 1,214 ft | 370 m |
| Brush Mountain | | Virginia | Craig | Glenvar | 37°21′42″N 080°13′51″W | 3,104 ft | 946 m |
| Brush Mountain | | Virginia | Amherst | Montebello | 37°47′48″N 079°09′24″W | 3,442 ft | 1,049 m |
| Brush Mountain | | Washington | Pend Oreille | Boyer Mountain | 48°08′34″N 117°24′10″W | 3,146 ft | 959 m |
| Brush Mountain | | Washington | Ferry | La Fleur Lake | 48°26′02″N 118°17′18″W | 3,491 ft | 1,064 m |

== Other countries ==
- Brush Mountain (Alberta) in Alberta, Canada
