= Topatopa Mountains =

Mountain range of the Transverse Ranges in California, United States

- Topa Topa Mountains
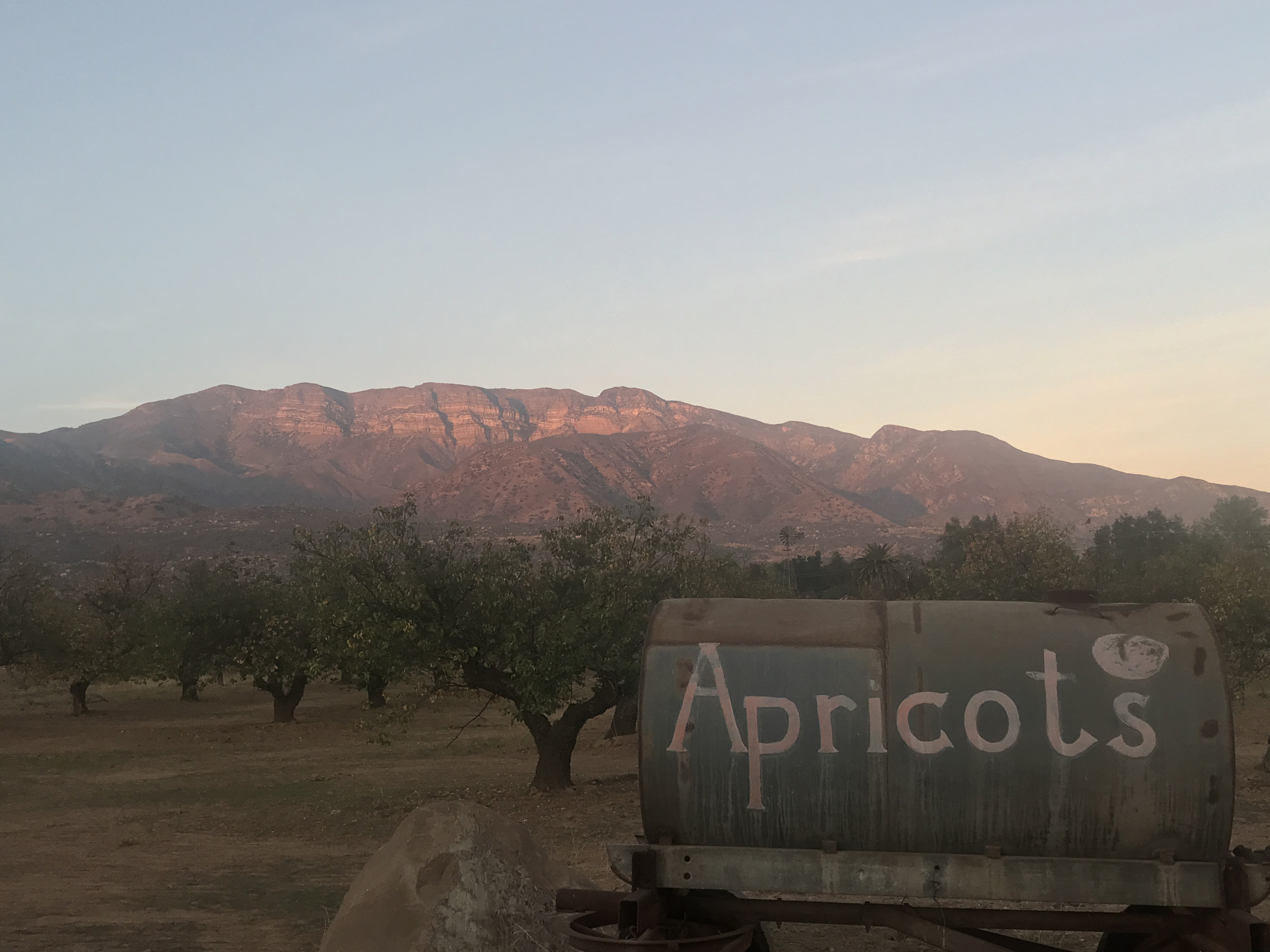
- "The Pink Moment" on the Topa Topa bluffs, as viewed from Upper Ojai.

Highest point
- Peak: Alamo Mountain
- Elevation: 7,402 ft (2,256 m)
- Coordinates: 34°31′48″N 119°02′35″W

Geography
- Location within California
- Country: United States
- State: California
- County: Ventura
- Parent range: Transverse Ranges
- Borders on: Sierra Pelona Mountains and Sierra Madre Mountains

The Topatopa Mountains are a mountain range in Ventura County, California, north of Ojai, Santa Paula, and Fillmore. They are part of the Transverse Ranges of Southern California.

== Etymology ==
A name for the mountains was first inscribed within the archives of Mission Basilica San Buenaventura in 1943, citing a nearby Chumash ranchería named "Si-toptopo". In 1945, American linguist and ethnologist John Peabody Harrington noted that "topa" is a Chumash word meaning "reed" or "rush".

== Geography ==
The Topatopa Mountains lie in an east–west direction east of the Sierra Madre Mountains, and west of the Sierra Pelona Mountains. To the south lies the Santa Clara River Valley into which various creeks drain starting in the mountains into the Santa Clara River. The range reaches an elevation of 7,402 feet (2,256 m) at Alamo Mountain. Snow frequently falls on the high peaks during winter.

=== Hydrology ===
Several major tributaries of the Santa Clara River flow down from the Topatopa Mountains, the largest being Piru Creek and Sespe Creek.

Lake Piru is the only major reservoir located within the mountains.

== Natural history ==
The Topatopa Mountains are within the southern Los Padres National Forest. The Sespe Wilderness Area, and the Sespe Condor Sanctuary, are primarily within the Topatopa Mountains and foothills. They are part of the home range of the endangered California condor.

The habitat is of the California montane chaparral and woodlands ecoregion. Sespe Creek flows through the range, creating Sespe Gorge, with Riparian habitats of willows and woodlands.

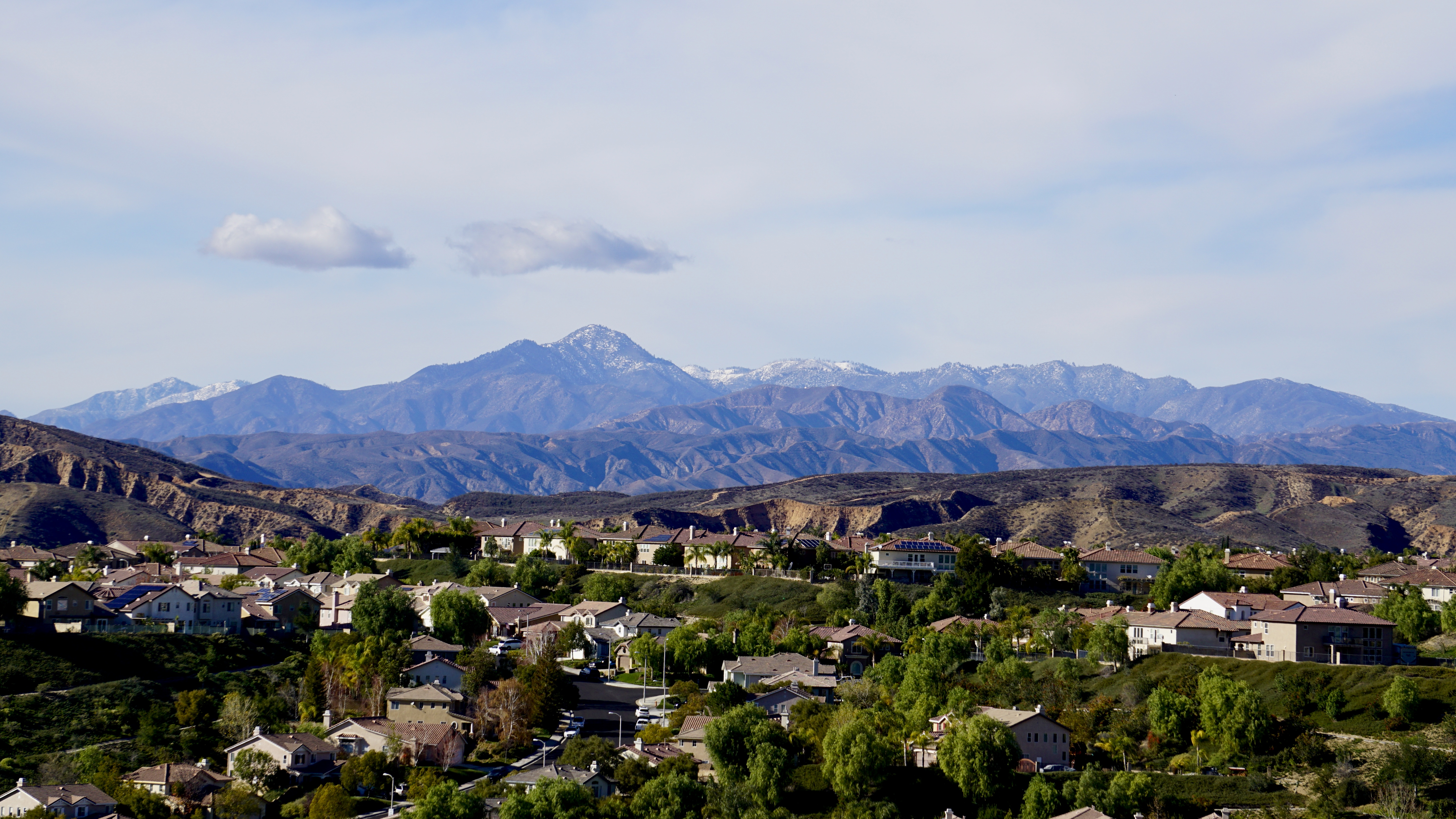
Northeastern face as viewed from Santa Clarita.

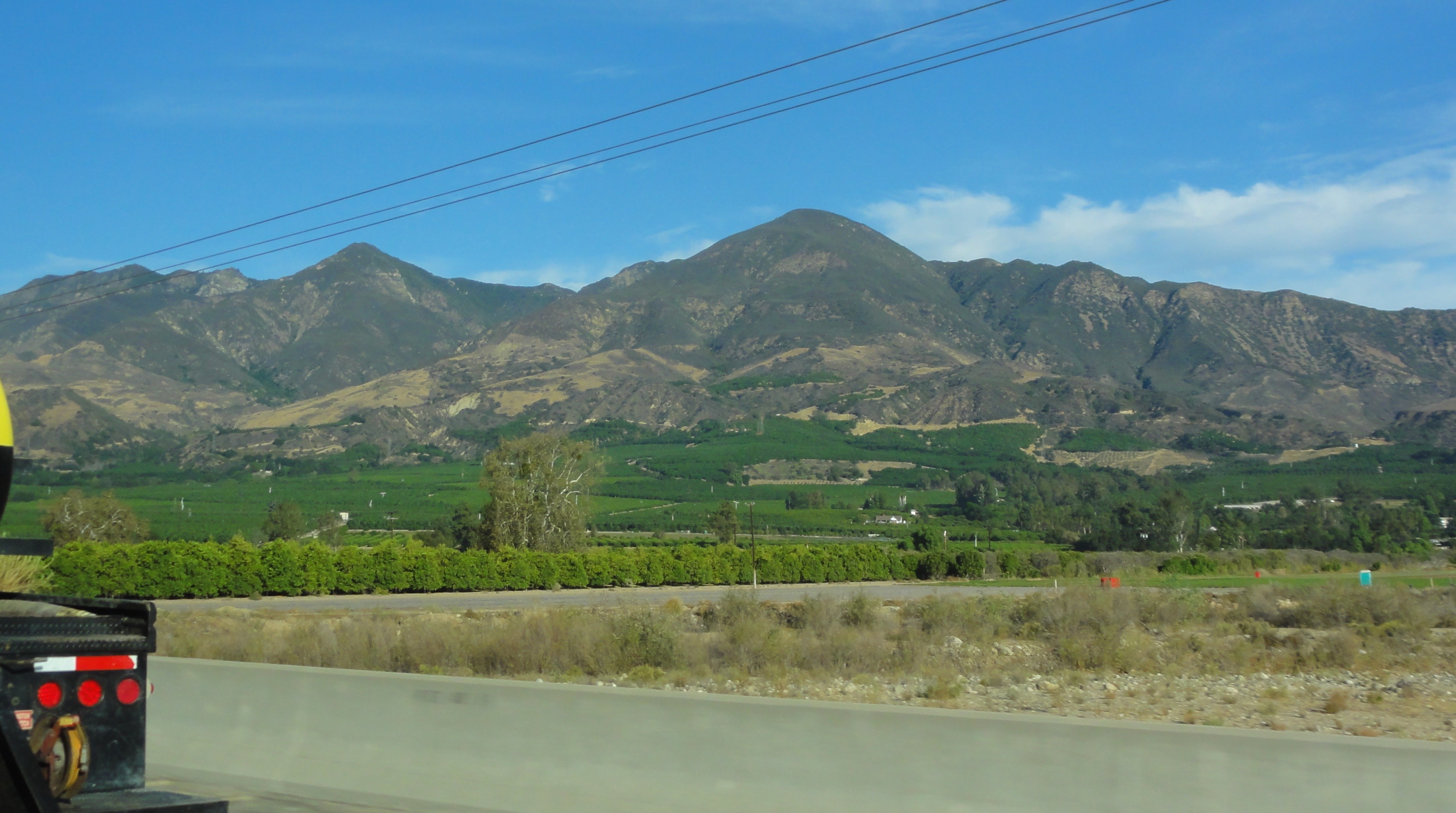
View from Fillmore of the Topatopa Mountains, with San Cayetano Mountain at center.

The southeastern face of the Topatopa Mountains as seen from Santa Clarita Valley.

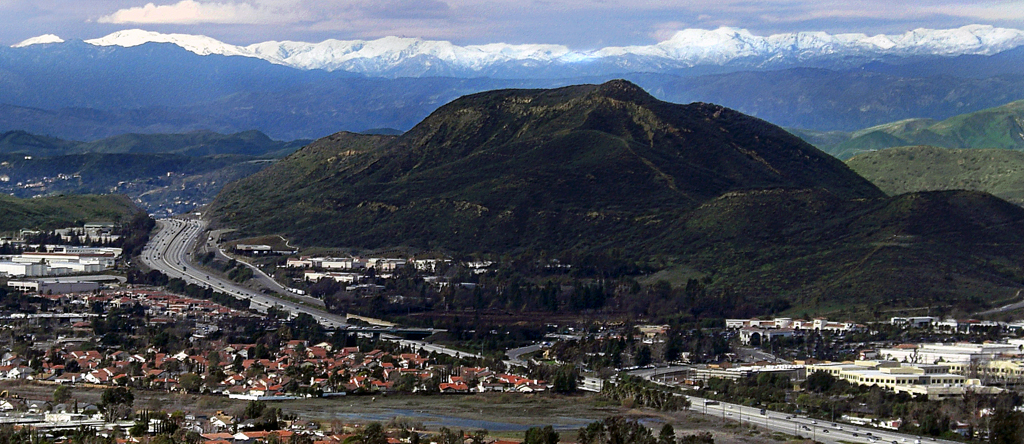
View from Newbury Park with Conejo Mountain in front and the Topatopa skyline behind.

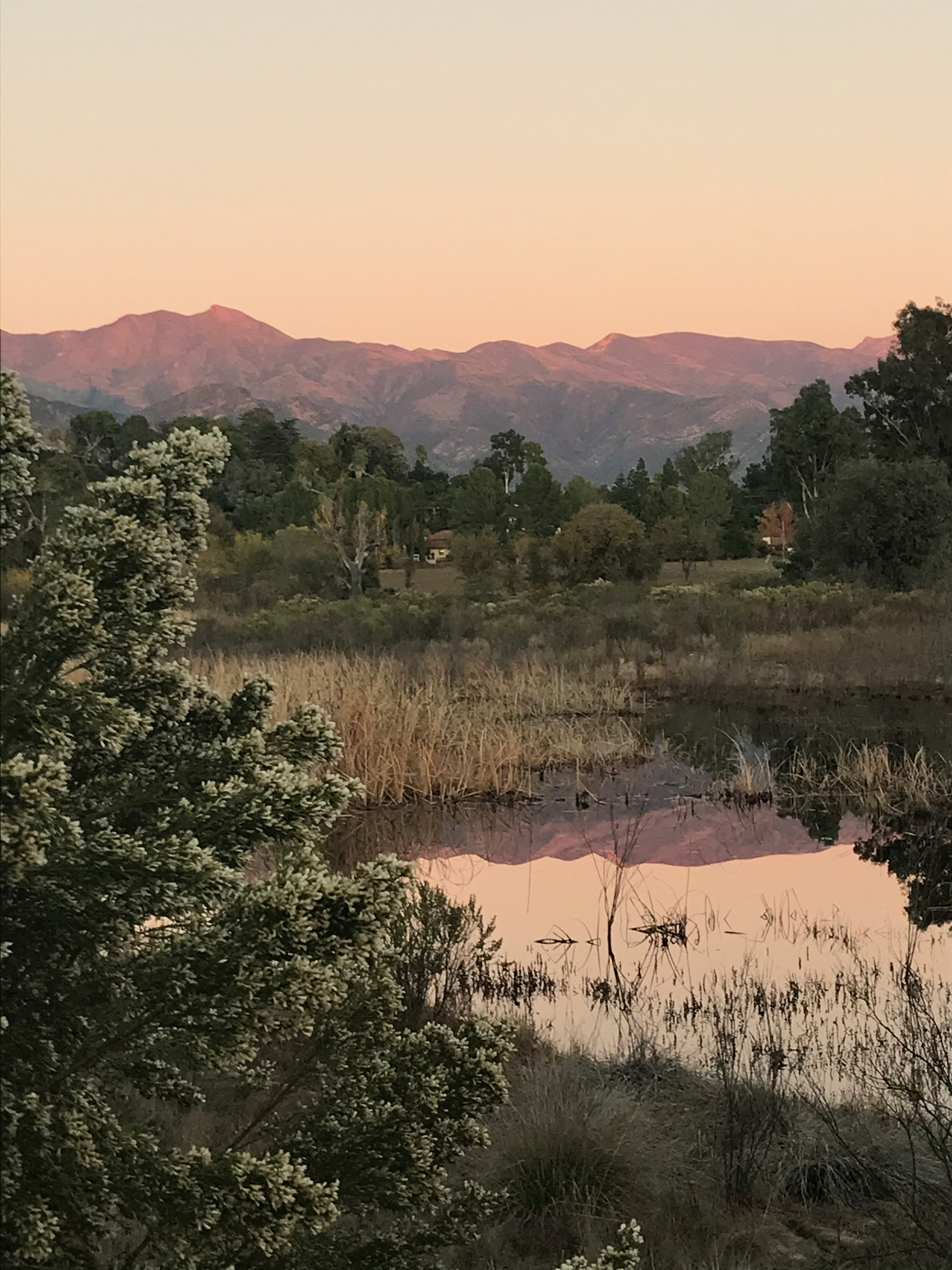
"The Pink Moment" on Chief Peak, as seen from across a vernal pool at Ojai Meadows Preserve.

== Peaks over 6,000 ft (1,829 m) ==
- Alamo Mountain - 7,402 ft (2,256 m)
- McDonald Peak - 6,875 ft (2,096 m)
- Cobblestone Mountain - 6,738 ft (2,054 m)
- Sewart Mountain - 6,737 ft (2,053 m)
- Hines Peak - 6,703 ft (2,043 m)
- San Rafael Peak - 6,666 ft (2,032 m)
- San Guillermo Mountain - 6,609 ft (2,014 m)
- Snowy Peak - 6,537 ft (1,992 m)
- Peak 6453 - 6,453 ft (1,967 m)
- Topatopa Bluff - 6,367 ft (1,941 m)
- White Mountain - 6,253 ft (1,906 m)
- Black Mountain - 6,204 ft (1,891 m)
- Topatopa Peak Lookout - 6,200 ft (1,890 m)

== Adjacent Transverse Ranges ==
- San Emigdio Mountains - to the north
- Pine Mountain Ridge - to the north and northwest
- Sulphur Mountains - northwest across the Ojai Valley
- Sierra Madre Mountains - to the west
- Santa Ynez Mountains - to the southwest
- Santa Susana Mountains - to the southeast
- Sierra Pelona - to the east
- Tehachapi Mountains - to the northeast

== See also ==
- Sespe Creek
- Piru Creek

Media related to Topatopa Mountains at Wikimedia Commons
