= PBS Short Film Festival =

American film festival

- Founded: 2012
- Awards: Juried Prize, Most Popular (deprecated), People's Choice (deprecated), Most Watched (deprecated)
- Hosted by: PBS
- Festival date: held annually, usually in July
- Website: https://www.pbs.org/show/pbs-online-film-festival/

The PBS Short Film Festival, previously known as the PBS Online Film Festival, is an annual film festival focused on independent short films, hosted by American public broadcaster PBS. The festival began in 2012. In 2020, the name changed from the PBS Online Film Festival to the PBS Short Film Festival. In 2021, the festival replaced online voting and popularity awards with a jury prize, selected by a jury composed of filmmakers, producers and PBS executives.

The festival's films often cover social issues and are available to stream online via PBS’ website or its mobile video app, Passport, and additionally air on PBS’ member stations. The festival runs for two to six weeks and also hosts in-person screenings. As part of film selection, different member stations partner with PBS to find and submit films.

== History ==
The festival began in 2012, showcasing 20 films, which aired on the PBS website and YouTube channel. A "People’s Choice" prize was awarded based on votes from online viewers. The festival ran from March 1 to April 16 and was hosted by filmmakers Patrick Epino and Stephen Dypiangco of the National Film Society. In 2013, the festival expanded to highlight 25 films. Voting ran between March 4 and March 22.

The 2014 festival ran from June 16 to June 31 and similarly had 25 films, which were additionally streamed on Roku and Xbox, alongside the PBS website and YouTube. The 2015 film festival ran from June 15 to July 17 and was nominated for a Webby award. The 2015 festival garnered 350,000 streams and 50,000 votes. The 2016 festival ran from July 11 to July 29 and was the last to feature the "Most Watched" and "People’s Choice" awards. It also included 25 films.

In 2017, the festival introduced a Juried Prize, with a panel of eight jurors from PBS and the film industry selecting their favorite film. The "People’s Choice" award was renamed the "Most Popular" award, but was still chosen by online voters. The award was determined by adding all views, votes and Facebook and YouTube "shares" and "likes." In 2017, films were additionally streamed on Apple TV, Amazon’s FireTV and the PBS app on Android and iOS.

In 2018, the festival, which ran July 16 to July 27, expanded streaming to include Facebook video. The 2019 festival ran July 15 to 26 and began with a screening event at the Howard Theater. The 2019 jury included Washington Post film critic Ann Hornaday. The festival included Balloon Girl, a film by children's TV creator Shabnam Rezaei. The 2019 festival kept a Juried Prize and the Most Popular award.

In 2020, the festival changed its name from the PBS Online Film Festival to the PBS Short Film Festival. The 2020 competition kept both prizes from 2019 and ran July 13 to July 24.

In 2021, for the film festival's tenth anniversary, films were additionally available to be viewed in VR, across VR platforms like Daydream, Oculus/Meta Quest and PlayStation VR. That year, selected films were separated into six topical categories: culture, family, race, humanity, identity and society. The 2021 festival only offered a Juried Prize.

In 2022, the festival won a people’s choice Webby award for best festival or conference, as well as a People’s Choice Webby award. Those awards were among 10 won by PBS that year. The films were presented in five categories: family, identity, culture, humanity and race. The festival ran from July 11 to July 22. An inaugural screening was held at the National Harbor on July 15. Like the 2021 festival, the 2022 festival only offered a Juried Prize.

The 2023 festival was announced in January 2023.

== Awards ==
From 2012 to 2016, the PBS Short Film Festival awarded a "People’s Choice" award, voted on by online viewers of the year's selected films. In 2013, the festival also awarded a "Most Watched" award, which gave a second prize to the film with the most views or streams. In 2017, the festival changed to a single "Most Popular" award, based on views. That same year, PBS introduced a Juried Prize. In 2021, PBS retired the Most Popular award.

As of 2022, the PBS Short Film Festival only offers a Juried Prize.

=== Mixed Award table ===
Film		Notes	Award	Filmmakers
2023	WINN	From REEL SOUTH. Cover's Pamela Winn's advocacy for the Dignity for Incarcerated Women Act.	Juried Prize	Joseph East Erica Tanamachi
2022	Chilly and Milly	Animated. Also screened at Sundance and Miami Short Film Festivals.	Juried Prize	William D. Caballero
2021	Ms. Diva Trucker	From KLRU-TV	Juried Prize	Dana Reilly
2020	In This Family	Winner of Loni Ding Award in Social Issue Documentary at CAAMFest	Juried Prize	Drama Del Rosario
2020	Joyride	From Latino Public Broadcasting (LPB). Winner of SFFILM Kenneth Rainin grant.	Most Popular	Edwin Alexis Gomez
2019	The Moon and the Night	In Hawaiian: Ka Mahina a me Ka Pō	Juried Prize	Erin Lau
2019	BT Lives in the Stitch	From Illinois Public Media. Follows the knitting club at North Lawndale College Prep High School. Nominated for a 2020 Emmy award.	Most Popular	
2018	Black Canaries	Grand Jury Awards for Best Film and Best Cinematography at HollyShorts Film Festival	Juried Prize	Jesse Kreitzer
2018	Cowgirl Up	Premiered at Slamdance Film Festival	Most Popular	Nathan Willis
2017	You Can Go	From Georgia Public Broadcasting. Also screened at the 2016 Tribeca Festival.	Juried Prize	Christine Turner
2017	Maria	Stylized as "MARIA”	Most Popular	Karin Williams Jeremiah Tauamiti
2016	Goldstar	From LPB. Later made into a feature film called Bruising for Besos.	People's Choice	Karla Legaspy
2016	Artist's Day Jobs: Emily Lynch Victory	From Twin Cities PBS. Also called "Emily Lynch Victory – Painter/Math Trainer." Part of Minnesota Original web series "Artist’s Day Jobs.”	Most Watched	
2015	Sinner, Victim, Saint		People's Choice	Moses Flores
2015	11 Paper Place	Animated. From Vermont PBS.	Most Watched	Daniel Houghton
2014	My Dear Americans	Won Shoe String Trophy and Best of the Fest at the Rochester International Film Festival 2015	People's Choice	Arpita Kumar
2014	Digging for Water	Follows a Haitian community trying to find a clean water source after a drought.	Most Watched	
2013	LIVE Art	About the School of the Performing Arts in the Richmond Community (SPARC). Not be confused with From the Wings: The LIVE ART Story, a long-form documentary about SPARC that won an Emmy award.	People's Choice	Bill Gaff Martin Montgomery
2013	The Story of An Egg	Details the origins of the phrase "cage-free"	Most Watched	Douglas Gayeton
2012	The Horse You See	In Navajo, with English subtitles	People's Choice	Melissa Henry
