= Lake Piru =

Reservoir in Ventura County, California

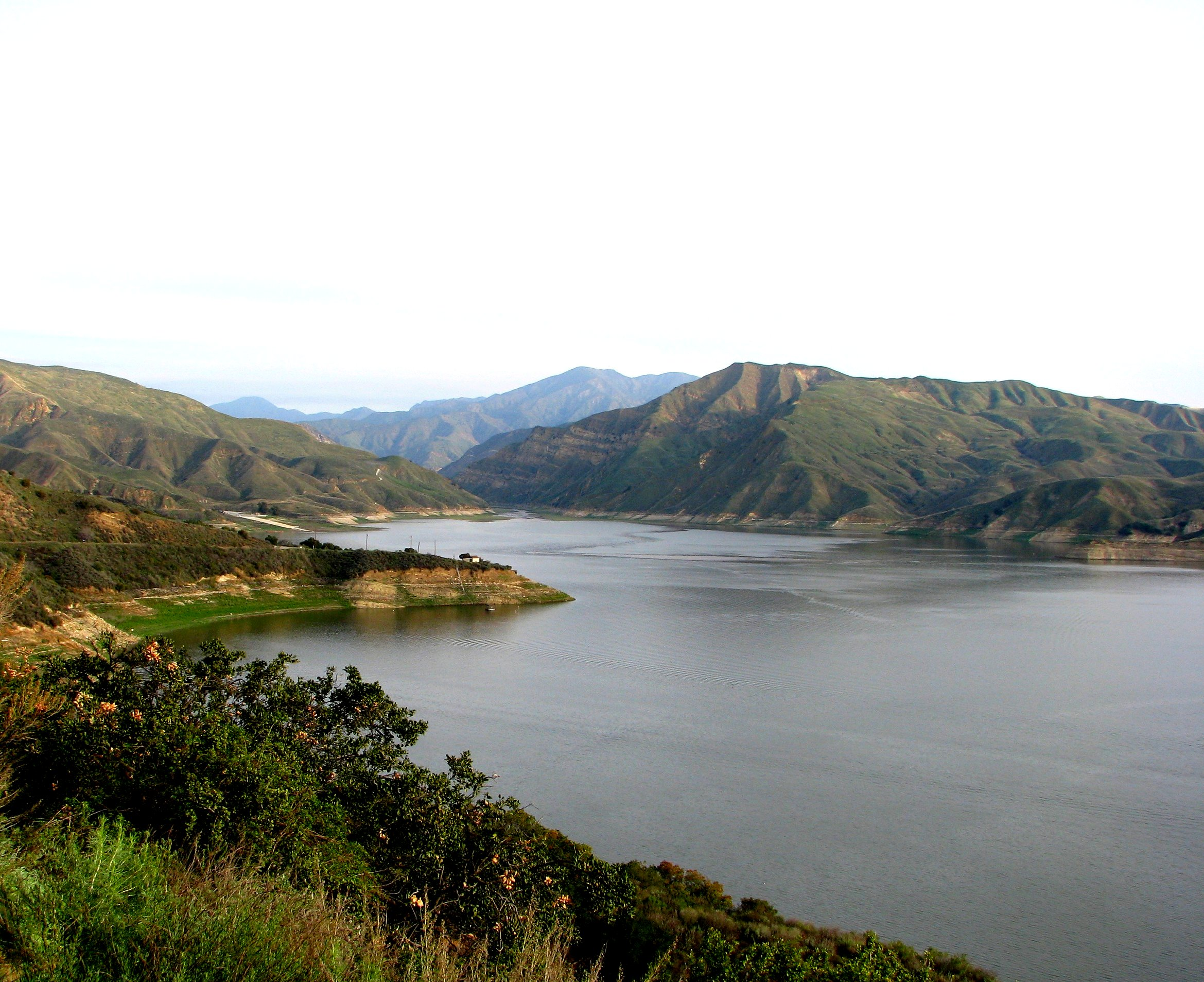

- Location within California
- Location: Los Padres National Forest, Topatopa Mountains, Ventura County, California
- Coordinates: 34°28′39″N 118°45′18″W
- Type: Reservoir
- Primary inflows: Piru Creek; Agua Blanca Creek
- Primary outflows: Piru Creek
- Catchment area: 421.4 sq mi (1,091 km^{2})
- Basin countries: United States
- Surface area: 1,240 acres (500 ha)
- Max. depth: 130 ft (40 m)
- Water volume: 83,244 acre⋅ft (102,680,000 m^{3})
- Surface elevation: 1,043 ft (318 m)
- References: U.S. Geological Survey Geographic Names Information System: Lake Piru

Lake Piru (/ˈpaɪruː/) is a reservoir located in Los Padres National Forest and Topatopa Mountains of Ventura County, California, created by the construction in 1955 (71 years ago) of the Santa Felicia Dam on Piru Creek, which is a tributary of the Santa Clara River.

The reservoir is widely known for celebrity incidents: in 1999, actor Harrison Ford crashed his helicopter by the lake, and in 2020, actress Naya Rivera died by drowning. Several other people have drowned in the lake as well.

== United Water Conservation District ==
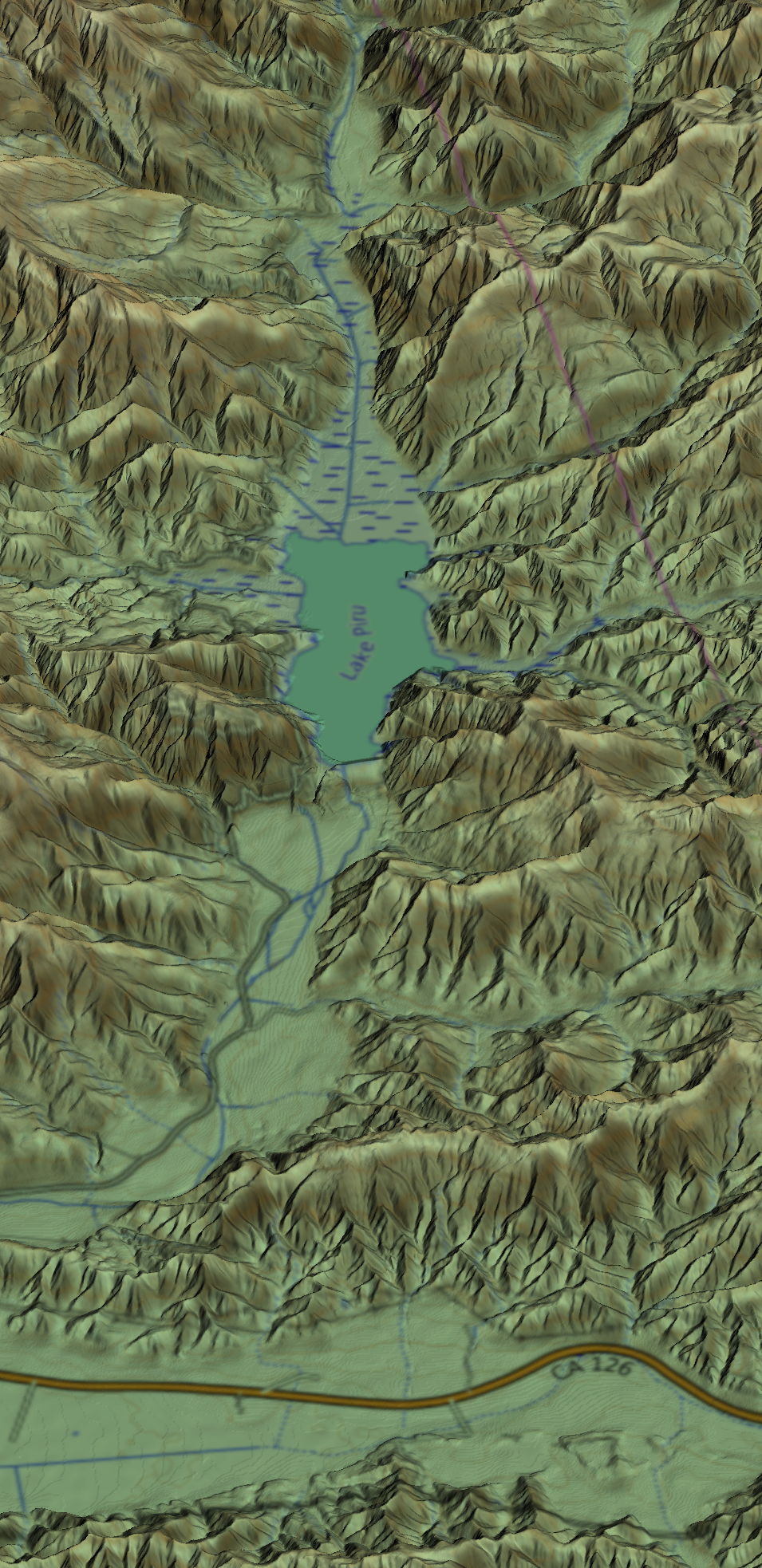

The elevation of the reservoir is 1,043 ft (318 m), and the elevation of the dam spillway is 1,055 ft (322 m). The dam is owned and operated by the United Water Conservation District based in nearby Santa Paula, California. The district is a multi-service district providing flood control, recreation services, surface, and groundwater conservation, groundwater replenishment, and wholesale water for agriculture and urban uses to the Santa Clara River Valley and Oxnard Plain. Formed on December 5, 1950, under the Water Conservation Act of 1931, it owns approximately 2,200 acres (890 ha) around and including the lake and dam.

== Lake Piru Recreation Area ==
The Lake Piru Recreation Area, along the western shore, has about 60 acres (24 ha) with various recreational facilities for camping, boating, fishing, and picnicking. The 238 campsites have water and electric hookup along with a snack bar. There are 66 boat slips with a full-service marina. While swimming had been a popular recreational activity, it was formally prohibited in August 2020 following the death of actress Naya Rivera in July that year; the lake had been closed to the public for over a month before the ban was imposed. Prior to this, it was the only lake in the county that permitted swimming.

The lake is situated downstream from Pyramid Lake and can be accessed from Piru Canyon Road near the town of Piru, California.

The California Office of Environmental Health Hazard Assessment (OEHHA) has developed a safe eating advisory for Lake Piru based on levels of mercury or PCBs found in fish caught from this water body.

In 2020, the Lake Piru Recreation Area was closed for several months for various reasons. Besides one week at the start of July, it was closed to the public for almost five months between April and August. It was initially closed before April 4 because of the COVID-19 pandemic, reopening on July 1. It then re-closed a week later following the disappearance of Naya Rivera, and stayed closed until August 20 because of this and, later, the Holser Fire blocking Piru Canyon Road.

=== Invasive species ===
Quagga mussels were discovered in Lake Piru in December 2013. While this was the first discovery in Ventura County, they are an invasive species found in various rivers and lakes in the U.S. United Water Conservation District prepared a draft Quagga Mussel Monitoring and Control Plan in consultation with the California Department of Fish and Wildlife, the Federal Energy Regulatory Commission, the National Marine Fisheries Service, and other relevant stakeholders. The draft plan outlines the monitoring, containment, and control measures United implements to responsibly address quagga mussels. United also adheres to standard operating procedures for vessel screening, inspection, and decontamination.

== Drownings ==
Due to harsh conditions such as debris, low visibility, different currents, strong winds, and cold water temperatures, a number of fatalities related to drowning have occurred at Lake Piru:

- In August 1994, 27-year-old Jesus Danilo Carranza drowned in the lake while on an outing with his family, even though he was wearing a life jacket.
- In July 1997, Liborio Dominguez of Long Beach drowned in the lake while trying to rescue his daughter. Dominguez's body was discovered several days later.
- In September 1997, 22-year-old Isidro Castillo of Newhall drowned in the lake and his body was found a day later.
- In September 1997, rescue workers recovered the body of 30-year-old Ulises Anthony Mendoza of Port Hueneme, who disappeared days earlier while swimming in the lake.
- In February 1998, Lake Piru employee Arthur Raymond Caladara was found drowned in the lake. The details of his death are unknown.
- In June 1998, the body of 30-year-old Vy Xuan Dang of Garden Grove was found by a park ranger; he was last seen swimming near a boat days earlier.
- In September 2000, 25-year-old Eric Cruz of Van Nuys drowned 10 feet from the shore.
- On August 25, 2008, 39-year-old Anatoly Naftoli Smolyansky drowned in the lake. He was on a boat with his family when his 5-year-old daughter fell into the water. Smolyansky jumped into the water to save her, but disappeared beneath the surface as he was pushing her back onto the boat. Smolyansky's 9-year-old son aided in his sister's rescue and both children survived. After a week-long search, Smolyansky's body was found floating north of Diablo Cove by a group of Lake Piru rangers and Ventura County Sheriff's Search and Rescue divers.
- Nine-year-old Piru resident Denise Arredondo drowned roughly 150 feet (46 m) from the shore while wading in the water on May 16, 2009.
- On May 22, 2010, 36-year-old Roberto Barrios disappeared under water while swimming in the lake with friends. His body was found submerged in the lake three days later.
- On September 11, 2014, the drowned body of a 28-year-old Piru woman was found. The following day, Ventura County Medical Examiner's Office described the death as a suicide.
- On July 8, 2020, actress Naya Rivera disappeared while swimming in the lake with her son. Rivera's body was recovered on the morning of July 13 following a five-day search. Taking Rivera's death into consideration, as well as similar incidents prior, Ventura County decided to ban swimming at Lake Piru permanently.
- On July 13, 2024, 50-year old Henry Rodriguez of Charlotte, North Carolina, drowned after experiencing a medical emergency.

== Other incidents ==
On October 23, 1999, actor Harrison Ford was on a training flight in his helicopter when he crashed in a dry riverbed by the lake; both Ford and his instructor were unharmed.

== In popular culture ==
Parts of the pilot episode of television series Supernatural were filmed at the lake, with the episode focusing on the main characters seeking out the ghost of a drowned woman.

The episode of the series Lost Tapes, "Oklahoma Octopus" was filmed here.

The car chase scenes of NSYNC's music video "Bye Bye Bye" were filmed along Piru Canyon Road leading to the lake.

Season 3, episode 1 of the sitcom "Malcolm in the Middle" was filmed at the lake.

Season 1, episode 6 of "Government Cheese" is set at the lake.

Music video of Deftones My Own Summer (Shove It) was filmed here on 1st of October 1997.

== See also ==
- List of dams and reservoirs in California
- Reservoirs in Ventura County, California
- Topatopa Mountains
