= San Emigdio Mountain =

Mountain in Kern, USA

- Location within California Location within the United States

Highest point
- Elevation: 7,495 ft (2,284 m) NAVD 88
- Prominence: 1,412 ft (430 m)
- Listing: Hundred Peaks Section
- Coordinates: 34°52′24″N 119°10′44″W

Naming
- Etymology: Saint Emygdius

Geography
- Location: Kern County, California, U.S.
- Parent range: San Emigdio Mountains
- Topo map: USGS Sawmill Mountain

Climbing
- Easiest route: Dirt road and short hike, class 1

San Emigdio Mountain is in the San Emigdio Mountains, located in Kern County, a few miles north of the Ventura County border in Southern California.

San Emigdio Mountain is part of the southern wall of the San Joaquin Valley, in the Los Padres National Forest. It is near Frazier Mountain, northwest of the community of Pine Mountain Club, and to the west of Interstate 5 and the Tehachapi Mountains.
