= Pine Mountain Ridge (California) =

Massif of the Transverse Ranges in California, United States

Coordinates: 34.3271°N 117.6952°W

Highest point
- Peak: Reyes Peak
- Elevation: 7,510 ft (2,290 m)

Geography
- Country: United States
- State: California
- Region: Ventura County
- Parent range: Transverse Ranges

Pine Mountain Ridge (or simply Pine Mountain) is a massif of the Transverse Ranges located in northern Ventura County, and entirely within the Los Padres National Forest. The ridge is a large block of Matilija Sandstone, and reaches some of the highest elevations in the southern Transverse Ranges. The north slope of the ridge is part of the Sespe Wilderness.

Major peaks on the ridge include, from west to east, Reyes Peak, Haddock Peak, and Thorn Point.

== Ecology ==
The ridge is located in the California montane chaparral and woodlands ecoregion. Lower slopes are dominated by chaparral, while the upper reaches of the mountain support a forest of jeffrey pine, white fir, sugar pine, bigcone douglas fir, and California incense cedar.

== See also ==
- Santa Ynez Mountains - to the west
- Topatopa Mountains - to the south
- Sierra Pelona Mountains - to the east
- San Emigdio Mountains - to the north
