= Tecuya Mountain =

Mountain within the San Emigdio Mountains of California

- Location within California Location within the United States

Highest point
- Elevation: 7163+ ft (2183+ m) NAVD 88
- Coordinates: 34°50′32″N 118°58′53″W

Geography
- Location: Kern County, California, U.S.
- Parent range: San Emigdio Mountains
- Topo map: USGS Frazier Mountain

Climbing
- Easiest route: Trail hike

Tecuya Mountain in southern Kern County, California, more than 7,163 feet (2,183 m) high, is the highest point on the Tecuya Ridge of the San Emigdio Mountains in the Transverse Ranges.
