= Frenchs Pass =

Coordinates: 36°56′25″N 121°13′48″W

Frenchs Pass is a gap on the divide of the Diablo Range and on the boundary of San Benito County and Merced County, California. The pass is at an elevation of 2,428 feet (740 meters) on the north shoulder of 3,257-foot Antimony Peak.

== History ==
Before it was named Frenchs Pass, in the early 1850s, this gap was used by the gang of Joaquin Murrieta to cross over the mountain divide with their droves of wild and stolen horses, driving them south to their depot and ranch at Cantua Creek and ultimately to Sonora for sale.
