= San Emigdio Mountains =

Mountain range of the Transverse Ranges in California, United States

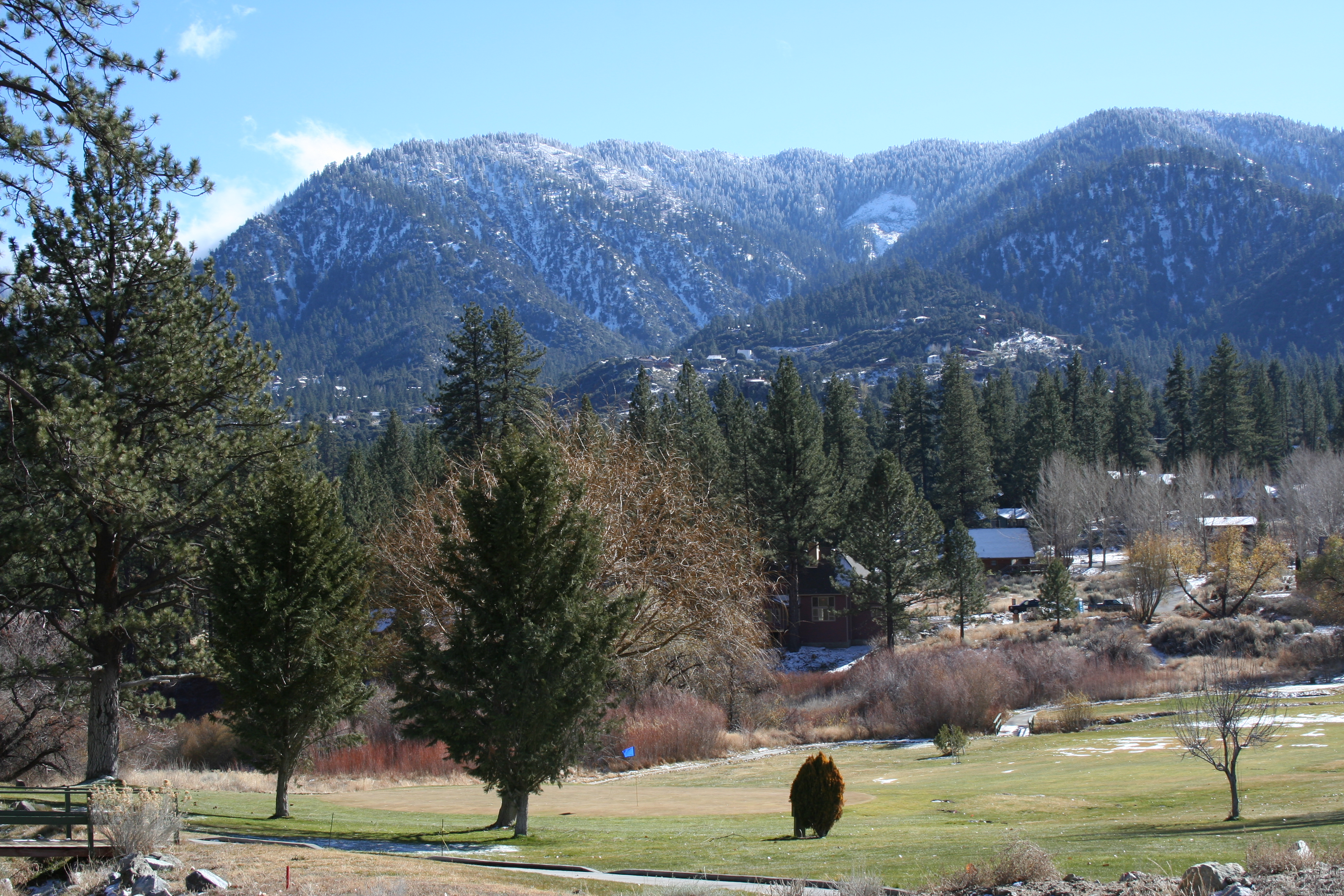
- Mt. Pinos at top right

Highest point
- Peak: San Emigdio Mountain
- Elevation: 7,492 ft (2,284 m)
- Coordinates: 34°52′23.912″N 119°10′44.394″W

Geography
- Location within California
- Country: United States
- State: California
- County: Kern
- Parent range: Transverse Ranges
- Borders on: Tehachapi Mountains and Temblor Range

The San Emigdio Mountains are a part of the Transverse Ranges in Southern California, extending from Interstate 5 at Lebec and Gorman on the east to Highway 33–166 on the west. They link the Tehachapis and Temblor Range and form the southern wall of the San Joaquin Valley. The range is named after Emygdius, an early Christian martyr.

== Geography ==
The range is within Kern County. The highest point is San Emigdio Mountain at 7,492 feet (2,284 m). As with most of the Transverse Ranges, the mountains generally lie in an east-west direction.

Towns or settlements near the San Emigdio Mountains include Frazier Park, Lake of the Woods, and Pine Mountain Club.

== Highest peaks ==
1. San Emigdio Mountain 7,492 ft (2,284 m)
2. Tecuya Mountain 7,160+ ft (2,182+ m)
3. Escapula Peak 7,080+ ft (2,158+ m)
4. Brush Mountain 7,048 ft (2,148 m)
5. Antimony Peak 6,848 ft (2,087 m)
6. Eagle Rest Peak 6,005 ft (1,830 m)

== Adjacent ranges ==
Adjacent Transverse Ranges, with their wildlife corridors, include:

- Tehachapi Mountains — on the northeast
- Sierra Pelona Mountains — on the east
- Pine Mountain Ridge - (to the south)
- Topatopa Mountains — on the southwest
- San Rafael Mountains - (to the west)
- Santa Ynez Mountains - (to the southwest)
- San Joaquin Valley — on the north
- Temblor Range - (to the northwest)

== See also ==
- Mountain Communities of the Tejon Pass
- Pyramid Lake
- Index: Transverse Ranges
