= Antimony Peak (San Benito–Merced counties, California) =

Mountain in California, United States

Coordinates: 36°56′25″N 121°13′48″W

Antimony Peak is a mountain summit on the east west divide of the Diablo Range and on the boundary of San Benito County and Merced County, California. It rises to an elevation of 3,248 feet (990 meters) just south of Frenchs Pass on the same divide and southeast of French Ranch.
