= Wildcat Canyon (South Fork Pacheco Creek) =

Wildcat Canyon is a canyon and tributary stream of South Fork Pacheco Creek in Santa Clara County, California. Its source is in the Diablo Range in San Benito County, California. Its source is a spring at an elevation of 2,560 feet (780 meters), on the southwest slope of Mariposa Peak (3,448 feet) near its summit at 36°57′15″N 121°12′52″W. Its mouth is at its confluence with South Fork Pacheco Creek at an elevation of 1,388 feet (423 meters).
