= Cobblestone Mountain (California) =

Mountain in California, United States

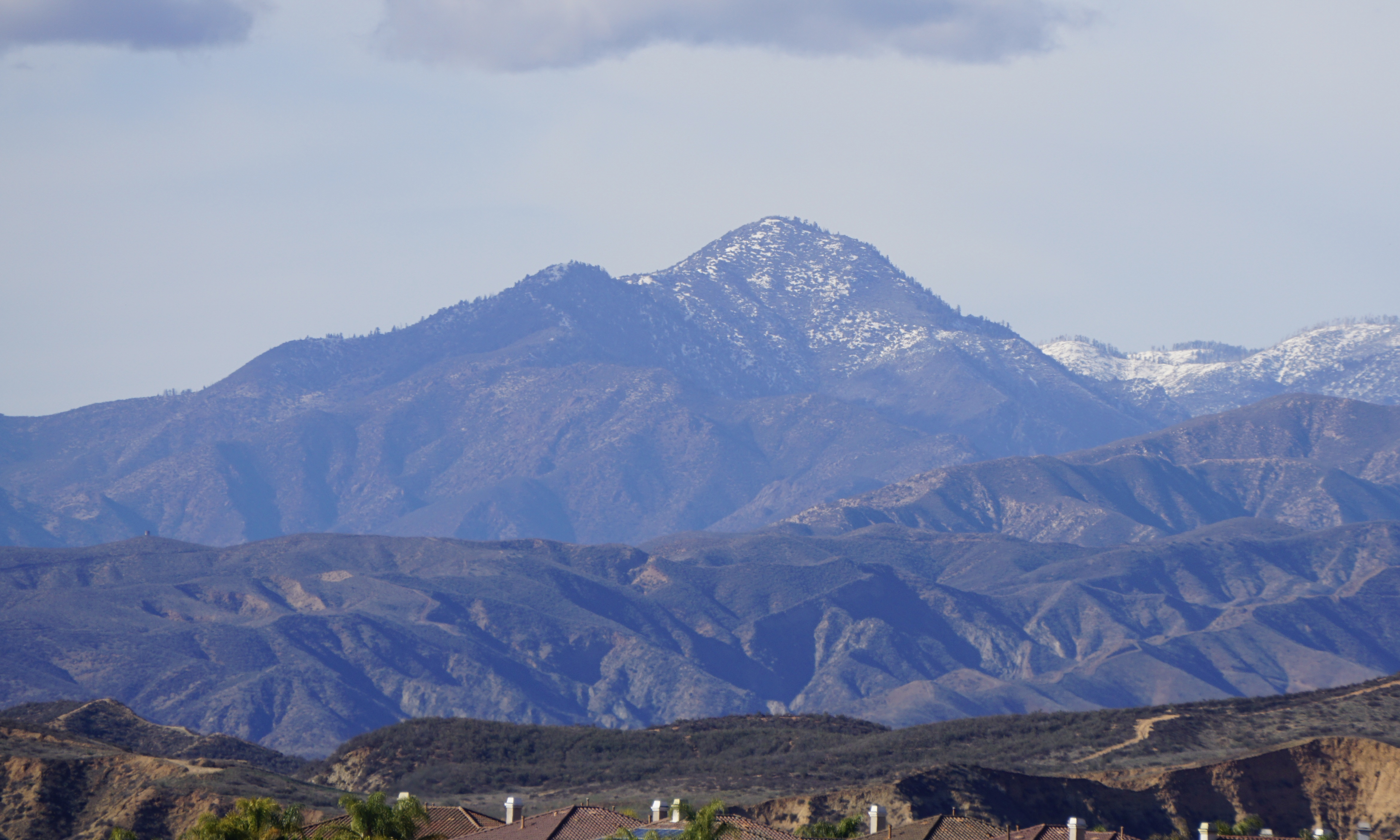
- View of the mountain's eastern face

Highest point
- Elevation: 6,738 ft (2,054 m) NAVD 88
- Prominence: 1,373 ft (418 m)
- Listing: Sierra Club Hundred Peaks Section
- Coordinates: 34°36′32″N 118°52′04″W

Geography
- Location: Ventura County California, U.S.
- Parent range: Topatopa Mountains; Transverse Ranges
- Topo map: USGS Cobblestone Mountain

Climbing
- Easiest route: Hike

Cobblestone Mountain is a peak in the Topatopa Mountains, in Ventura County, about 14 mi (23 km) north of Piru, California. At 6,738 feet (2,054 m), it is the third highest peak of the Topatopa Mountains. the highest is Alamo Mountain at 7,402 ft (2,256 m). Snow frequently falls on the mountain during winter.

== Overview ==
When viewing the Alamo Mountain Region from the east, Cobblestone Mountain is the most visibly prominent mountain of the entire range. It can be seen from the Santa Clarita Valley, the San Fernando Valley from higher areas, on the westbound descent of the Santa Susana Pass on State Route 118, and in Gorman heading southbound on Interstate 5

The peak is in the Sespe Wilderness, which is part of the Los Padres National Forest.

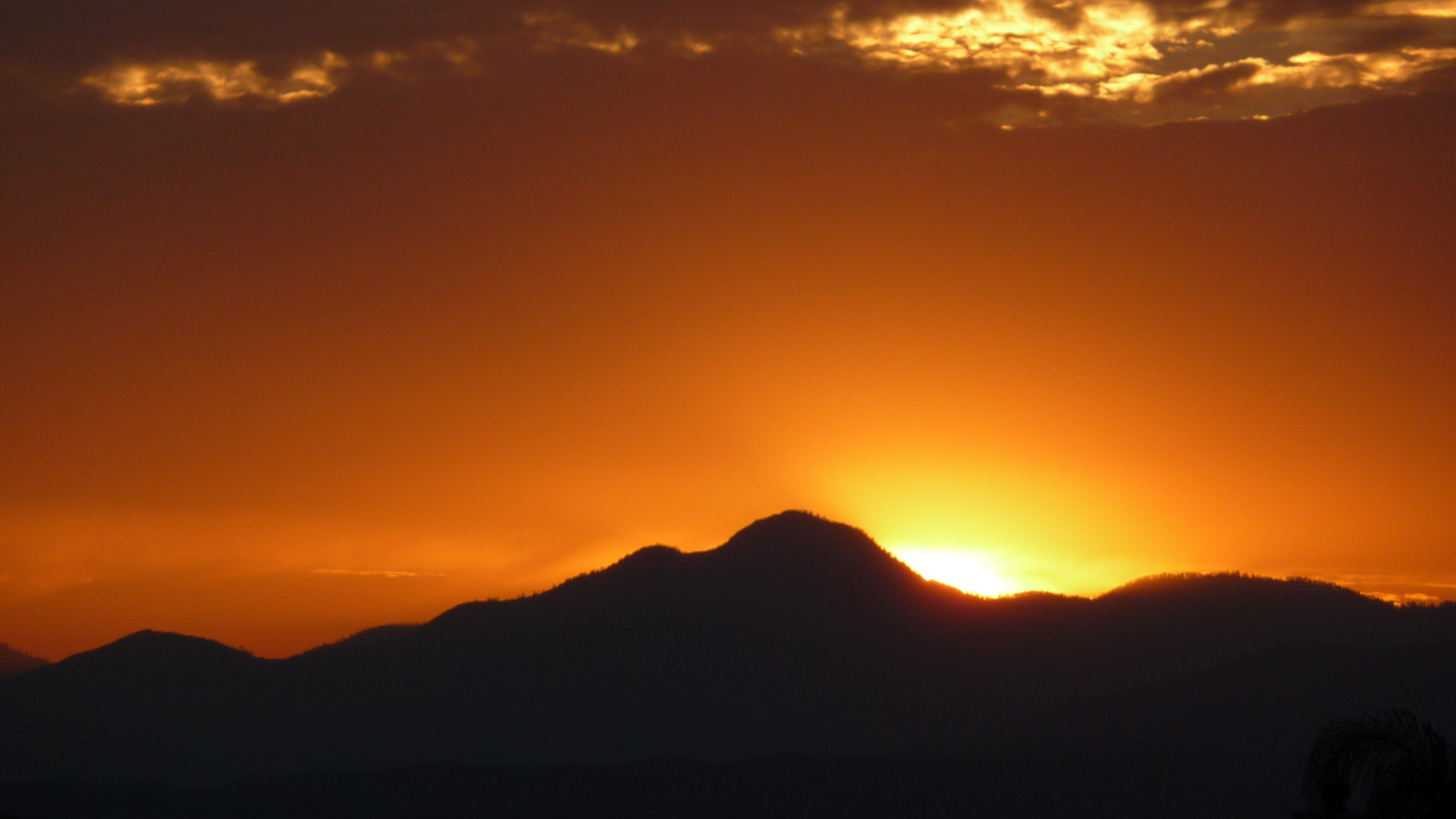
Sunset upon Cobblestone Mountain as viewed from Santa Clarita.

== See also ==
- Los Padres National Forest
- Transverse Ranges
