= Drama Del Rosario =

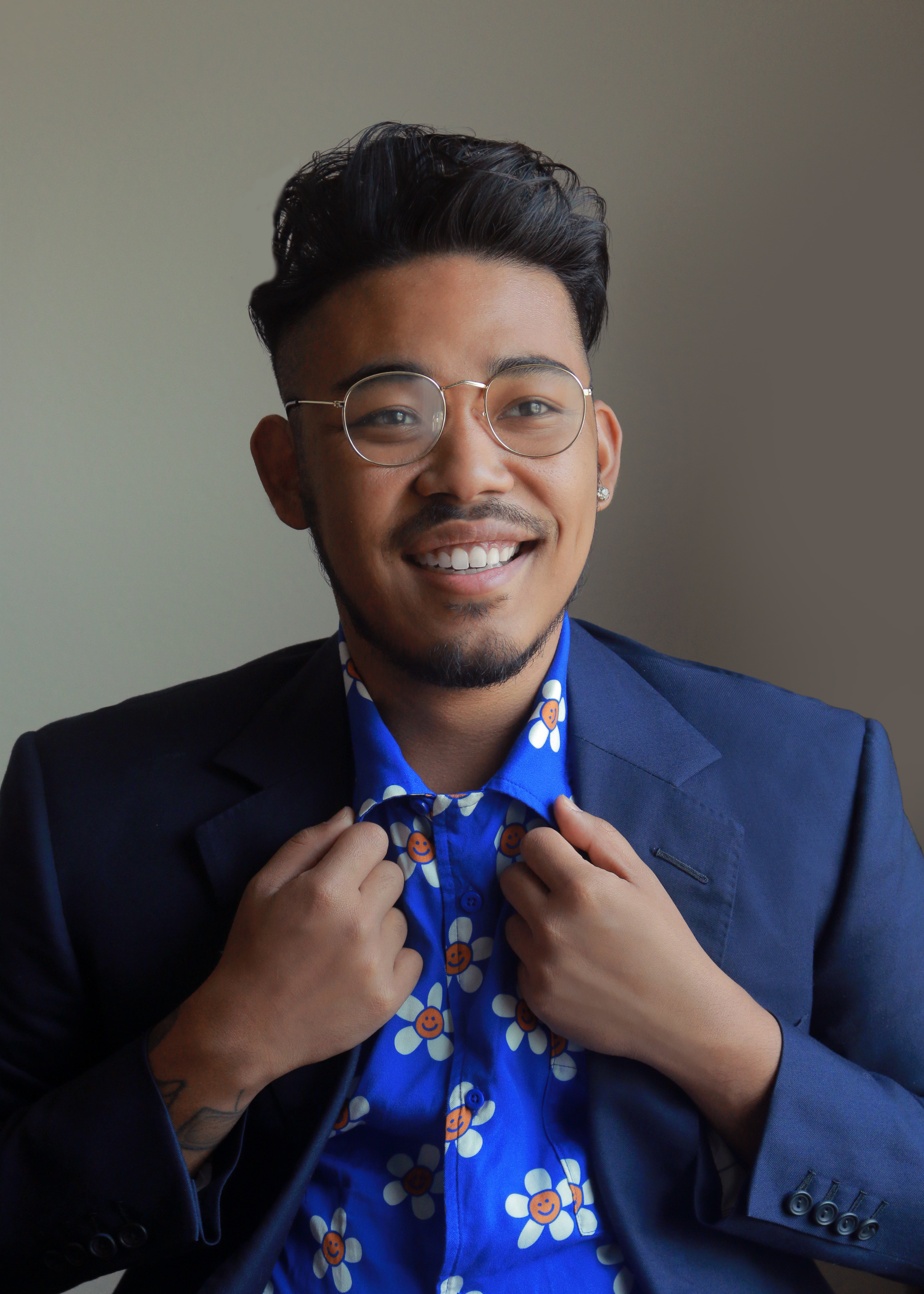
- Born: 4 September; Manila, Philippines
- Occupation(s): Director, Writer, Editor, Producer
- Years active: 2015 - present

Drama Del Rosario is a Filipino documentary filmmaker based in Los Angeles. He is best known for his work on the documentary films I’m Okay (And Neither Are You), Act Like a Woman and In This Family.

== Life and career ==
Drama was born in Manila, Philippines. He graduated magna cum laude from the Ateneo de Manila University with a Bachelor of Arts, Major in Communication degree. He later moved to the US and graduated summa cum laude from the New York Film Academy in Los Angeles with a Master of Fine Arts in Documentary degree. His documentary film, In This Family, won the Loni Ding Award in Social Issue Documentary at CAAMFest. In This Family focuses on his personal story of coming out as a gay teenager in the Philippines.

In 2019, Drama won the inaugural BAFTA-GSA Short Film Commissioning Grant for his documentary film, I'm Okay (And Neither Are You), which follows his personal recovery from sexual assault trauma.

== Filmography ==
Year	Title	Contribution	Note
2015	Popemania	Writer/Director/Editor	
2016	The Big Fans	Writer/Director/Editor/Producer	
2017	In This Family	Writer/Director/Editor/Producer	
2018	Act Like a Woman	Writer/Director/Editor/Producer	
2018	The End of Life	Writer/Director/Editor/Producer	
2019	I'm Okay (And Neither Are You)	Writer/Director/Editor/Producer	
