= Hundred Peaks Section =

The Hundred Peaks Section (HPS) is a mountaineering society within the Angeles Chapter of the Sierra Club that serves to provide mountaineering activities for Sierra Club members in the southern Sierra Nevada, the Transverse Ranges, and the Peninsular Ranges, and to honor mountaineers who have summited peaks in those mountain ranges.

The section hosts summit hikes and scrambles in the Los Angeles and Inland Empire area three to four times per week. These hikes are open to the public.

== History ==
The Hundred Peaks Section is the second-oldest of the Angeles Chapter mountaineer sections, and is its most active. It was started by outdoorsman Weldon Fairbanks Heald (1901–1967) in 1941, who wanted to summit 100 peaks in Southern California.

== Membership ==
To become a member of the HPS, one must be a Sierra Club member and have climbed at least 25 peaks on the HPS List and subscribe to the section newsletter, The Lookout.

Especially accomplished members are awarded with emblems, with the following grades (from highest to lowest):

- Thousand Peaks Emblem
- List Completion
- 200 Peaks Bar
- 100 Peaks Emblem

Upon receiving one of the normal emblems, members may be recognized with one of the following additional emblems, which are not ranked:

- Pathfinder Emblem
- Explorer Emblem
- Snowshoe Emblem
- 100 Peaks Leadership Emblem
- 200 Peaks Leadership Emblem

== HPS List ==
To the general public, they are most known for their peak bagging list. One of the longest curated peak bagging lists in the country, it covers 281 of the most notable 5,000 feet (1,500 m) peaks in southern California. Unlike the Sierra Peaks Section or Desert Peaks Section lists, there are no "emblem" peaks of particular significance; all peaks are considered to have equal importance when it comes to being recognized for completing the list.

Peaks are added and taken off the list regularly, depending on availability of public access and interest.

== Notable members ==
- Ingolf Dahl
- Mars Bonfire
- John Backus

== See also ==
Other peak bagging lists:

- New England Fifty Finest
- Adirondack High Peaks
