= List of most polluted rivers =

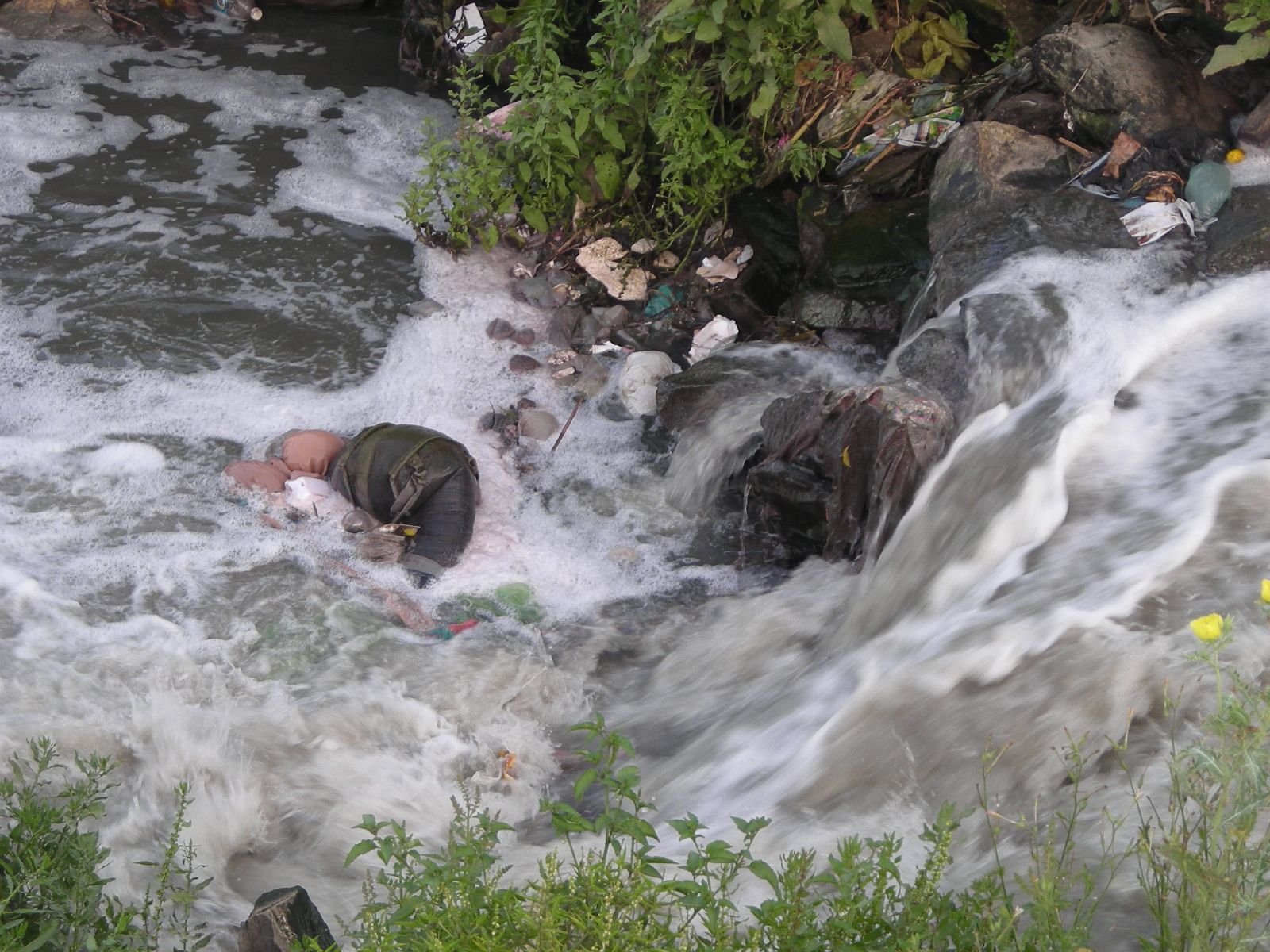
Significant pollution flowing in the River Ganges, generally considered to be among the worst-polluted rivers worldwide.

This list contains rivers and other streams that have been regarded, currently or historically, as among the most polluted in the world due to their quantity of pollution, the severity of different components of the stream's pollution, its impact on the local population, or a combination of all factors.

== Africa ==
| Name | Location | Dependent population | Description | Sources of pollution | Impact |
|---|---|---|---|---|---|
| Akaki River | Central Addis Ababa, Ethiopia | | Significantly high contaminant concentrations in the rivers. | Waste disposal site of Addis Ababa, Ethiopia's largest city. | Rural population downstream of the main city put at risk of health issues. |
| Awash River | Ethiopia | 18.6 million | Internationally famous for its high density of hominin fossils. Inscribed on the UNESCO World Heritage List in 1980. | Industrial and urban wastes, agricultural runoff (pesticides, fertilizers), and sewage discharge. | Severe ecosystem damage. |
| Imo River | Southeastern Nigeria | | Reported by the World Health Organization as one of the most polluted rivers in Nigeria. | General Manager Emeka Ugoanyanwu issued a public warning that that locals should not dispose of trash, urinate, bury the dead, and build soak-away pits along the river, due to it polluting the river with coliform bacteria. | Severe risk of making the main source drinkable water for Owerri non-potable. |
| Modjo River | Central Ethiopia | | One of the two most polluted rivers in Ethiopia. | Toxic industrial chemicals | |
| Nairobi River | Kenya | | The rivers are mostly narrow and highly polluted, though recent efforts to clean the rivers have improved water quality. | Agriculture, slums, and industry. | |
| Olifants River | South Africa and Mozambique | | Close to the historical area of the Pedi people, Sekhukhuneland. | Green algae and very high sulphate levels attributed to coal mining and industry in the upper catchment. | |
| Osun River | Osun State, Nigeria | | One of the river goddesses in Yorubaland. In 2018, the river suddenly began to change color due to gold mining. The river recorded the highest level of microplastics ever reported in river water globally in early 2024. | Plastic pollution, heavy metals and cyanide contamination as a result of illegal gold mining, and human generated waste. | Threatening the Osun Osogbo Sacred Grove. |

== Asia ==
| Name | Location | Dependent population | Description | Sources of pollution | Impact |
|---|---|---|---|---|---|
| Bharalu River | Assam, India | | One of the most polluted rivers in the state of Assam. The biochemical oxygen demand of the river is 52 mg/L compared to the permissible limit set by the National River Conservation Directorate (NRCD) of 3 mg/L. | Guwahati city's municipal wastes. | The obnoxious smell generated by the river is also a health hazard for the residents of Guwahati. |
| Buckingham Canal | India | | Constructed during British rule, no longer used due to rail and road travel. The most polluted waterway in Chennai. | Sewage and effluents from industry and agricultural in Chennai, including North Chennai Thermal Power Station. Nearly 60% of the estimated 55 million litres of untreated sewage produced by Chennai is dumped into it daily. | The silting up of the canal left the water stagnant, creating an attractive habitat for malaria-spreading mosquitoes. |
| Buriganga River | Dhaka, Bangladesh | | Economically very important to Dhaka. Ranks among the most polluted rivers in the country. | Chemical waste of mills and factories, household waste, medical waste, sewage, dead animals, plastics, and oil, primarily among nine industrial areas lacking industrial wastewater treatment plants. | |
| Citarum River | West Java, Indonesia | ~5,000,000 | Longest and largest river in West Java, Indonesia. Described by the Asian Development Bank as the world's most polluted river. | 2,000 industries, primarily textile factories, contaminate 5,020 sq miles of the river with over 20,000 tons of waste and 340,000 tons of wastewater daily. Toxins include lead, mercury, arsenic, sulphites, nonylphenol, Phthalates, PCB 180, paranitrophenol, and tributylphosphate. | Elimination of a significant part of the river's fish population, estimated at 60% since 2008. |
| Cooum River | Tamil Nadu, India | 9,000 families | Called "a stinking cesspool" in poetry and journalism. A World Bank-funded project shows that it is 80 per cent more polluted than treated sewer water. | An estimated 55 million litres (15,000,000 US gal) of untreated sewage from government agencies like Chennai Corporation and local businesses, leading to high faecal coliform bacteria, pesticide, lead, zinc and cadmium levels. | Fish were able to survive in the water for only 3 to 5 hours even after samples were diluted. Almost zero dissolved oxygen. |
| Ganges | India | Tens of millions of people | The most sacred river to Hindus. Levels of thermotolerant coliform bacteria from human waste in the river near Varanasi are more than 100 times the Indian government's official limit. | Failure of the Ganga Action Plan due to corruption and poor planning/expertise. | Main article: Pollution of the Ganges |
| Ghadir River | Southern Beirut region, Lebanon | About 120,000 inhabitants in the Hayy El-Sellom neighborhood. | The most polluted river in Lebanon, described in 2017 by Lebanese minister of public works Youssef Fenianos as no longer normal water, but sewage water. | Industrial zones by the river. | Floods of sewage water in settllements near the river, leading to periodic displacement. Believed to contribute to elevated rates of asthmatic and skin diseases, especially in children. |
| Ilek | Aktobe Region, Kazakhstan, and Orenburg Oblast, Russia. | | The most polluted water body in the Ural-Caspian basin. | Boron and chromium in the river caused by the tailing ponds of former chemical plants via ground water. | |
| Indus River | China, India, Pakistan | | Birthplace of the Indus Valley Civilisation in the Bronze Age. Second among a group of ten rivers responsible for about 90% of all the plastic that reaches the oceans. | | Endangerment of the Indus river dolphin. |
| Jordan River | Jordan, Israel, Syria, Israeli-occupied Palestinian territory of West BankWest Bank | | The river holds major significance in Judaism and Christianity. According to the Bible, the Israelites crossed it into the Promised Land and Jesus of Nazareth was baptized by John the Baptist in it. | Dumping of sewage and brackish water, coupled with lack of cooperation between Israel and neighboring Arab states. | Destruction of the 100-kilometre downstream stretch's ecosystem, which environmentalists stated could take decades to undo. |
| Kishon River | Haifa District, Israel | | Considered the most polluted river in Israel by several government authorities. Mentioned six times in the Hebrew Bible. | Daily contamination for over 40 years with mercury, other heavy metals, and organic chemicals by nearby chemical plants, including Haifa Chemicals. | Has caught on fire several times due to chemical contaminants. Found that three hours to the river's water led to DNA damage in rainbow-trout liver-cells to be on average threefold that of unpolluted water. Shayetet 13 veterans were provided compensation after developing sickness and higher occurrences of cancer after training near the river. |
| Marilao River | Central Luzon, Philippines | ~250,000 people | Marilao and Meycauayan together deemed among the world's 30 most polluted places in the developing world in a 2007 study. | Per the Blacksmith Institute: “Industrial waste is haphazardly dumped into the Meycauayan, Marilao and Obando River system” | |
| Musi River | Telangana, India | | Ranked as the 22nd most polluted river in the world. | Active pharmaceutical ingredients, concentration of 12,000 nanograms per litre. Includes caffeine, nicotine, acetaminophen, metformin, gabapentin, ketoconazole, and antibiotics. | Antibiotic resistance, feminization of fish, and making fish more susceptible to predation. |
| Pasig River | National Capital Region, Philippines | Metro Manila | Ranked as the largest contributor of plastic waste to the world's oceans in 2021. | Household waste and industries | Considered biologically dead by 1990, although aquatic life has since returned due to rehabilitation efforts. |
| Periyar River | Kerala, India | | Significantly polluted in its lower reaches. | Eloor industrial zone industries dumping waste including DDT, endosulfan, hexa and trivalent chromium, lead, cyanide, and BHC. | Many biologically dead zones, with pollution almost wiping out traditional occupations along the river and its wetlands, including fishing and farming. |
| Ravi River | India, Pakistan | | Regarded in 2022 studies as the most contaminated river globally, with pharmaceutical residues from paracetamol, nicotine, caffeine, and medications for epilepsy and diabetes detected in its waters. | Careless disposal of large amount of industrial and agricultural wastewater and faulty drainage systems in both nations, especially in the Lahore metropolitan area. | |
| Sabarmati River | Gujarat and Rajasthan, India | | Its Kheroj-Vautha stretch was named by the Central Pollution Control Board (CPCB) as among the most polluted river stretches in India. However, most of the river has been cleaned now due to initiatives by the Indian Government and the river also has a river front in Ahmedabad city. | Further polluted by the Ahmedabad civic body's failure to build a sewage treatment plant in Motera. | |
| Sahibi River | Delhi, India | | Delhi's most polluted body of water. | Direct inflow of untreated sewage from surrounding populated areas. | |
| Techa | Russia | 28,000 residents formerly, 23 of 24 settlements evacuated. | | Mayak complex dumped an estimated 76 million cubic metres (2.7×10^{9} cu ft) of radioactive waste water into the Techa River, a cumulative dispersal of 2.75 MCi (102 PBq) of radioactivity. | In the past 45 years, about half a million people in the region have been irradiated in one or more of the incidents, exposing them to as much as 20 times the radiation suffered by the Chernobyl disaster victims. |
| Tungabhadra River | Karnataka and Andhra Pradesh, India | 1 million people | Regarded as among the most polluted rivers in India due to it dark brown colour and a pungent odor downriver of industries. | Industry and mining on its banks in the Chikkamagaluru, Shimoga, Davangere, Haveri, Vijayanagara, Bellary, Koppal and Raichur districts of Karnataka and in the Kurnool district of Andhra Pradesh. Nearly 30 million liters of effluents released into the Tunga from the lone non-mining Shimoga each year." | Regularly impacts village fishermen due to fish kills, and causes health impacts to residents in its sub-basin relying on its water for drinking, bathing, irrigating crops, fishing and livestock water. |
| Vaitarna | Nashik and Palghar district of Maharashtra, India | | Supplies much of Mumbai's drinking water. | One of the most polluted rivers in India, primarily in its lower stretches. | Untreated industrial and civic waste |
| Yamuna | Uttarakhand, Uttar Pradesh, Haryana, Delhi, India | 57 million people | Second-largest tributary river of the Ganges by discharge, and the longest tributary in India. Accounts for more than 70 percent of Delhi's water supply. Highly venerated in Hinduism and worshipped as the goddess Yamuna. Receives 800 million litres of largely untreated sewage and additional 44 million litres of industrial effluents each day. | Discharge of wastewater in Delhi, with New Delhi dumping about 58% of its waste into the river. | |
| Yangtze | China | Nearly one-third of China's population | The fifth-largest primary river by discharge volume in the world. In September 2012, the Yangtze river near Chongqing turned red from pollution. | Industrial pollution, plastic pollution, agricultural runoff, siltation, untreated industrial and municipal sewage, and discharge of waste from pig farms. | Produces more ocean plastic pollution than any other. |
| Yellow River | China | 120 million people, over 420 million people live in the immediate provinces which rely on it as a water source. | Second-longest river in China and the sixth-longest river system on Earth. Birthplace of ancient Chinese civilization. | 4.29 billion tons of waste and sewage discharged in 2007 alone, mainly from urban factories and manufacturing facilities. | One-third of the river's course rendered unusable even for agricultural or industrial use. |
| Zarqa River | Jordan | Population of Zarqa | The Zarqa's water is brownish colored, often with dense foam due to large amounts of organic matter. | Raw sewage, Illegal dumping of industrial waste. | Has a stench which has been a cause of numerous complaints, particularly during the summer months. |

== Europe ==
| Name | Location | Dependent population | Description | Sources of pollution | Impact |
|---|---|---|---|---|---|
| Great Bačka Canal | Serbia | | Included in Serbia's "three black points". Considered one of the most polluted reservoirs in Europe. | Decades of dumping from industrial activity in Vrbas, resulting in 400,000 tons of silt which contains heavy metals and oil waste. | Extremely dangerous to bathe in and hazardous to the health of nearby populations. |
| River Calder | West Yorkshire, England | | Would run different opaque colours from day to day in the 1950s. | Buildup of byproducts from mining activities, textile industries, disused tar distillery in Mirfield, sewage, and more recently, chemical plants. | Loss of wildlife. |
| Donets | Russia and Ukraine | | Heavily contaminated with fertilizers, petroleum, phenols, zinc, chromium and copper. | Contaminated by industrial and communal wastes of Belgorod, Izium and Shebekino cities, and Donetsk and Luhansk regions. | Stretches near Kozenyi Butt, Bakhmut, and Lugan are so polluted that consuming fish caught there is dangerous. |
| River Fal | Cornwall, England, United Kingdom | | Described as the most polluted river in England. | In 2021, raw sewage was discharged straight into the river for over 7,500 hours as a consequence of the 100-year old sewage system being overwhelmed by heavy rain. | |
| Ibar | Kosovo; Montenegro; Serbia | Population of Kraljevo | Regarded as the most polluted river in Serbia. | Frequent spills of phenol | Significant health impacts to the population of Kraljevo. |
| Ishëm | Albania | | | Untreated wastewater from industry and the city of Tirana, leading to quantities of ammonia, nitrogen dioxide, and suspended solids that exceed EU legal limits on several different measures. | At its mouth, the river smells very bad and the bay is polluted by the wastewater, plastic, and other detritus from Tirana, which threatens an important sea turtle breeding ground. |
| Krivaja | Serbia | | Among the most polluted rivers in Serbia, especially in the lower section, downstream from Bačka Topola. | The dam upstream holds more water for farm irrigation during summers than it should, so the river is turned into the slow open sewage canal. | Has been an "ecological black spot" for years. |
| Meža | Austria and Slovenia | | The Meža has been the most polluted river in Slovenia. In 1982 the singer-songwriter Marijan Smode wrote a song about it titled "Mrtva reka" (The Dead River). | Mežica lead mine and the Ravne Steelworks (Železarna Ravne) conglomerate. | |
| Oder | Poland; Czech Republic; Germany | | Poland's second-longest river | ,Heavy industrialization of the area and large number of coal mines and chemical facilities. | See: 2022 Oder environmental disaster, at least 135 tonnes of dead fish washed up on its shores. |
| Sarno | Metropolitan City of Naples, Italy | | Partially used for irrigation, as well as the transportation of goods and fishing. | Agricultural waste and insufficiently treated industrial waste water from 500 small industrial units. | Has made bathing near the mouth of the river in the Tyrrhenian Sea impossible. |
| Rio Tinto | Southwestern Spain | | Has a unique red and orange colour extending for 50 kilometres, derived from its chemical makeup that is extremely acidic and with very high levels of iron and heavy metals. The name itself means "coloured river", in contrast to most rivers which are clear. | Approximately 5,000 years of ore mining, including copper, silver, gold, and other minerals. | Environmental concerns based on long disused water reservoirs, which might not be able to withstand the stress of renewed waste inputs. |

== North America ==
| Name | Location | Dependent population | Description | Sources of pollution | Impact |
|---|---|---|---|---|---|
| Acelhuate River | El Salvador | 1.7 million people | One the most contaminated and polluted rivers in El Salvador. | Domestic and industrial waste, containing iron, arsenic, lead, mercury, and zinc. | |
| Anacostia River | Maryland and Washington, D.C., United States | | Regarded as "D.C.'s forgotten river" due to weak investment and development along its banks and heavy pollution | Raw sewage discharges primarily during floods, and PCB contaminants from the Washington Navy Yard. | Public health threat because of fecal coliform bacteria and other pathogens; it also impairs water quality and can create hypoxic conditions that lead to large fish kills and sickness of people who get water in their mouth. |
| Blackstone River | Massachusetts and Rhode Island, United States | | Referred to by the United States Environmental Protection Agency as “the most polluted river in the country because of high concentrations of toxic sediments.” | Primarily wastewater from the Upper Blackstone Water Pollution Abatement District. | Rated as the worst category ("impaired") for all assessed uses ("aquatic life", "fish consumption", "primary contact" (e.g. swimming), "secondary contact" (e.g. boating) and "aesthetics"). |
| Calleguas Creek | Ventura County, California, United States | | Named the most polluted body of water in the jurisdiction of the Los Angeles Regional Water Quality Control Board in 2009. | | |
| Coatzacoalcos River | Oaxaca and Veracruz, Mexico | | Among the world's most contaminated rivers. | Petrochemical industry of Mexico Pemex, lack of environmental laws protecting the public water. | |
| Connoquenessing Creek | Western Pennsylvania, United States | | The second most polluted waterway in the United States in a 2000 study. | Armco Inc. steel facility in Butler, which ranked first nationally for the amount of pollutant discharges, which legally discharged more than 29 million pounds of nitrate compounds. | |
| Delaware River | New York, New Jersey, Pennsylvania, Delaware, and Maryland, United States | | The longest free-flowing (undammed) river in the Eastern United States. The segment near Philadelphia was named the 5th most polluted river in the United States by eco-activism groups in 2012. | 7–10 million pounds of toxic chemicals in the waterways mainly due to dumping by DuPont Chambers Works. | Pollutants leading to increased risk of birth defects, infertility, and cancer. |
| Río Grande de Santiago | Western Mexico | | One of the longest rivers in Mexico. Also one of its most polluted. | Over a thousand different chemicals in the main channel and its tributaries. These substances included semi-volatile and volatile organic compounds, such as phthalates (hormonal disruptors), phenols (compounds that affect neuronal development), toluene (a neurotoxin), and carcinogenic flame retardants. | Caused the death of an eight-year-old boy who fell into the river and succumbed to heavy metal poisoning nineteen days later. |
| Hackensack River | New York and New Jersey, United States | | Once believed to be among the most polluted watercourses in the United States. Three sections are designated as Superfund sites. | Once held the highest concentrations of methyl mercury of any fresh-water sediment in the world, as well as extensive residues of PCBs and other chemicals due to chemical companies. Despite closure of many industrial sites by the 2000s, still suffers from Urban runoff pollution, municipal sewage discharges from sanitary sewer overflows and combined sewer overflows, and runoff from hazardous waste sites continue to impair the river's water quality. | By the 1960s, much of the lower river was essentially a turbid hypoxic dead zone, with only the hardiest of species, such as the mummichog, able to survive in its waters. The Lower Hackensack was declared a federal Superfund site in 2022. |
| Lerma River | West-central Mexico | Mexico's second longest river. | | Untreated wastewater from industries. | Michoacán and Guanajuato documenting an increase in cancer and neurocysticercosis in populations that live near the river. Also has led to continuing loss of plant life in and around the river itself since 2005. |
| Merrimack River | New Hampshire and Massachusetts, United States | | One of the most endangered rivers in the United States, as named by the American Rivers nonprofit in 2016. | Combined sewer overflow from six untreated sanitary sewer systems, leading to elevated bacteria counts, low dissolved oxygen, and high nutrient levels and elevated counts of E. coli and fecal coliform. | Restriction of swimming and boating. Aquatic life and shellfishing beds have been affected due to excess lead, zinc, and other metals in the river. |
| Mississippi River | United States | ~70 million people | The world's tenth-largest river by discharge flow, and the largest in North America. | Elevated nutrient and chemical levels from agricultural runoff consisting of fertilizers and insecticides. | Primary contributor to the Gulf of Mexico dead zone. |
| Motagua River | Guatemala and Honduras | | One of the most plastic-emitting rivers in the world, contributing around two percent of global plastic pollution emissions into oceans annually. | Highly polluted with untreated sewage, industrial waste, tons of sediment (garbage) and blackwater from Guatemala City carried by the Río Las Vacas tributary. | Dangerous to marine protected areas of Honduras and Guatemala and conservation efforts to maintain species diversity. Impacts several Indigenous and coastal communities. |
| New River | The Mexico–U.S. border from Mexicali Municipality to Imperial County, California United States | | Composed of agricultural and chemical runoff waste. Called the most severely polluted river of its size in the United States. | Runoff and waste from farm industry irrigation in the U.S. (18.4%) and Mexico (51.2%), sewage from Mexicali (29%). Consists of contains a stew of about a hundred contaminants: volatile organic compounds, heavy metals including selenium, uranium, arsenic and mercury, pesticides (including DDT), and PCBs. | Contains pathogens that cause tuberculosis, encephalitis, polio, cholera, hepatitis and typhoid. Runoff into the Salton Sea has led to several fish die-offs and massive avian epizootics 1992–2019. |
| Newtown Creek | New York, United States | | One of the most polluted industrial sites in the United States, containing years of discarded toxins, an estimated 30,000,000 US gallons (110,000,000 L; 25,000,000 imp gal) of spilled oil. | Channelization made it one of the most heavily used bodies of water in the Port of New York and New Jersey. Worsened by the Greenpoint oil spill, raw sewage from New York City's sewer system, and other accumulation from a total of 1,491 sites. | Totally devoid of any lifeforms by the end of the 19th century. |
| Ohio River | Boundary of the Midwestern and Southern United States. | Source of drinking water for five million people. | Third largest river by discharge volume in the United States and the largest tributary by volume of the north–south flowing Mississippi River, which divides the eastern from western United States. Listed among America's Most Endangered Rivers of 2023. | Farm runoff and waste water from industrial processes such as steel production. 92% of toxic discharges were nitrates, with mercury also causing impacts. Also impacted by the East Palestine, Ohio, train derailment. | |
| Passaic River | Northern New Jersey, United States | | The lower eight miles (13 km) of the river contains 4.3 million cubic yards (3.3×10^{6} m^{3}) of toxic mud at its bottom. It is considered one of the most polluted stretches of water in the nation. | Industrial waste beginning in the 19th century, including dioxin generated by the Diamond Shamrock Chemical Plant as a waste product resulting from the production of Agent Orange. | |
| River Rouge | Metro Detroit, Michigan, United States | | Oil on the surface caught fire in 1969. | Suffered from municipal and industrial discharges, sewer overflows, and several nonpoint source pollution (e.g., storm water runoff), leading to high levels of polychlorinated biphenyls (PCBs), heavy metals (e.g., mercury), polycyclic aromatic hydrocarbons (PAHs), oil and grease. | Restrictions on fish and wildlife consumption, and on recreational use. Also caused degradation on fish and wildlife populations, and fish tumors and other deformities. |
| San Gabriel River | California, United States | | Mostly-urban waterway and the central of three major rivers draining the Greater Los Angeles Area. | Large amounts of industrial and urban runoff from 598 businesses, manufacturers, and other parties, the largest being the Los Coyotes plant with an output of 30 million gallons (110,000 m^{3}) per day. Upper reaches impacted by trash, debris, fecal coliforms, and heavy metals from recreational use. | Coyote Creek suffering from "acute and chronic toxicity" from pesticides and industrial chemicals, industrial contaminant pollution of a considerable portion of the groundwater in the San Gabriel River watershed, and detrimental impacts to the habitat. |
| San Joaquin River | Central California, United States | | One of the most polluted rivers in the United States, especially in its lower course. | "Ubiquitous" pesticide and fertilizer runoff and municipal runoff leading to elevated levels of selenium, fluoride, nitrates. | In 1983, it was found that birds had suffered severe deformities and deaths due to steadily increasing levels of chemicals and toxins. In the next few years, all the fish species died except for the mosquito fish, and algae blooms proliferated in the foul water. |
| Spring Creek | California, United States | | The stream is among the most polluted and acidic in the world. | Contains the Spring Creek Debris Dam, which serves primarily to collect severe acid mine drainage stemming from the Iron Mountain Mine. | |
| Tárcoles River | Costa Rica | About 50% of Costa Rica's population. | Considered the most contaminated river basin in the country. | The river's watershed drains approximately 67% of Costa Rica's untreated organic and industrial waste . | |
| Tijuana River | Baja California, Mexico California, United States | Called "one of the most polluted waterways in the country". | From 2018 to 2024, more than 100,000,000,000 US gallons (380,000,000 kL) of wastewater have flowed from Mexico into the United States via the Tijuana River according to the International Boundary and Water Commission, including toxins, metals, solvents, pathogens, and sewage. | Raw sewage from the city of Tijuana, Mexico. | Regular overflowing raw-sewage on the Mexican side, causing damage to vegetation and contributing to flooding. Citizens from both San Diego and Tijuana have fallen sick due to the sewage flowing into local beaches, with 34,000 people on Imperial Beach in 2017 alone. |

== Oceania ==
| Name | Location | Dependent population | Description | Sources of pollution | Impact |
|---|---|---|---|---|---|
| Darling River | New South Wales, Australia | | Third-longest river in Australia, and the outback's most famous waterway. | Pesticide runoff | Suffered from a severe cyanobacterial bloom that stretched the length of the river in 1992. Also suffered from fish kills in 2019 and 2023. |
| King River | Tasmania, Australia | | Was historically considered to be Australia's most polluted river. Is still heavily polluted due to acid water and heavy metal pollution. | Copper mining dewatering and run-off from the waste rock dumps. | High toxicity to aquatic life. |

== South America ==
| Name | Location | Dependent population | Description | Sources of pollution | Impact |
|---|---|---|---|---|---|
| Carioca River | Rio de Janeiro, Brazil | | One of the most polluted rivers in the state of Rio de Janeiro. | Untreated sewage | Carries pollutants that cause diarrhea, hepatitis, and leptospirosis. |
| Matanza River | Buenos Aires Province, Argentina | 3.5 million people | The most polluted river in Latin America and it is considered one of the ten most polluted places globally, with very high levels of lead. | Large amounts of industrial waste from the numerous factories along the river, especially tanneries. | 25% of children living in urban slums along the water's edge have lead in their bloodstreams, and even more suffer from gastrointestinal and respiratory illness. |
| Tietê River | Brazil | | Deemed the most polluted river in Brazil, according to National Geographic in 2010. | Pollution from São Paulo | Multiple species threatened, or possibly extinct in the case of the catfish Heptapterus multiradiatus. |

== Historically polluted rivers ==
| Name | Location | Description |
|---|---|---|
| Ayase River | Kantō, Japan | The most polluted river in Japan from the 1960s to the 1990s, leading to cleanup efforts. |
| River Churnet | Staffordshire, England | Became possibly the most polluted river in Europe in the 19th century. Improved after the decline of industry in Leek and the Churnet Valley. |
| Charles River | Massachusetts, United States | Suffered from significant industrial pollution called "foul and noisome, polluted by offal and industrious wastes, scummy with oil, unlikely to be mistaken for water." Fish kills and submerged vehicles were a common sight, along with toxic chemical plumes that colored parts of the river pink and orange. The Standells sang about the Charles in their 1965 song "Dirty Water". A combination of public and private initiatives helped drastically lower levels of pollutants, leading to the first "public swims" since the 1950s occurring in 2013. |
| Columbia Slough | Oregon, United States | Became one of Oregon's most polluted waterways due to being used as a waste repository during the first half of the 20th century. |
| Cuyahoga River | Ohio, United States | Infamous for catching on fire at least 14 times due to heavy industrial pollution, helping to spur the American environmental movement and triggering extensive cleanup efforts. |
| Detroit River | Metro Detroit, Michigan, United States | Was used for industrial purposes for more than 100 years, leading to thousands of migrating birds dying each year from oil slick and chemicals. The river's oxygen levels were depleted to the point where fish could not inhabit its waters. Because this pollution often drained into and affected Lake Erie, the lake was considered "dead" and unable to support aquatic life. Was designated an ecological refuge in 2001, with cleanup efforts leading to the return of many species of native animals. |
| Don River | Ontario, Canada | By the 1960s the river had become a neglected, polluted mess due to industrial pollution. In 1969, Pollution Probe held a much celebrated "Funeral for the Don" to highlight the plight of the river. The river would have a few species of fish be restored following the closure of industrial sites and cleanup efforts. |
| East River | New York City, New York, United States | Historically the receptacle for the city's garbage and sewage since New Amsterdam, leading to the destruction of the river's ecosystem. Was regarded as dangerous for anyone to fall into it as late as 2007. Environmental controls and cleanups have allowed the ecosystem to gradually rebuild. |
| Nervión | Spain | One of the most polluted rivers in the world due to a century of intense industrial activity causing the lower stretches of the river to become ecologically dead with oxygen levels 20 percent below the norm. Cleanup efforts starting in 1990 as well as the deindustrialization of the area brought about the reintroduction of natural life to the habitat. |
| Saint Louis River | Minnesota and Wisconsin, United States | One of the most heavily polluted waterways in Minnesota during the mid 20th century due to historical industrial use of the river, before the onset of modern environmental laws, resulting in the degradation of habitat and sediments contaminated with: mercury, dioxins, polychlorinated biphenyls (PCBs), polycyclic aromatic hydrocarbons (PAHs), and other toxins. Still suffers from high levels of mercury in fish tissue despite cleanup efforts. |
| Segura | Spain | One of the most polluted rivers in Europe in the 1990s, due to the canning industry and urban and agricultural residues from urban areas. Demonstrations and the construction of hundreds of wastewater treatment and collection systems led to the river becoming the Spanish river with the lowest average pollution in the span of just one decade. |
| River Team | Tyne and Wear, England | Historically regarded as one of the most polluted rivers in the area due to the discharges from Sewage works near Lamesley and heavy industry in the Team Valley. It is called "The Gut" by the residents of Dunston. However considerable improvements have now been made and the river is relatively clean. |
| River Trent | England | The rapid population increase of the towns that developed following the Industrial Revolution led to an "offensive stench" and thick industrial pollution that peaked in the 1950s. |
| Vermilion River | Louisiana, United States | Gained a reputation as the most polluted river in the United States in the 1970s. Improved sewage treatment, low flow streamflow augmentation, and regular in-stream trash collection have changed its public perception to that of a celebrated recreational resource. |
| River Wandle | Greater London, England | Heavily industrialized in the 18th and 19th centuries, during the Industrial Revolution, and was declared one of the most polluted rivers in England. Subsequent cleanup efforts have led to a return of the river's brown trout, as well as chub, roach and dace. |
| Yauza | Moscow and Mytishchi, Russia | Referred to as "the biggest gutter for waste in Moscow" due to industrialization in the 19th and 20th centuries. The ecology slightly improved in the 2000s, with the closing or conversion of old factories and cleanup efforts by the city government. |

== See also ==
- List of most-polluted cities by particulate matter concentration
