= Shasta Lake =

Reservoir behind Shasta Dam in California, United States

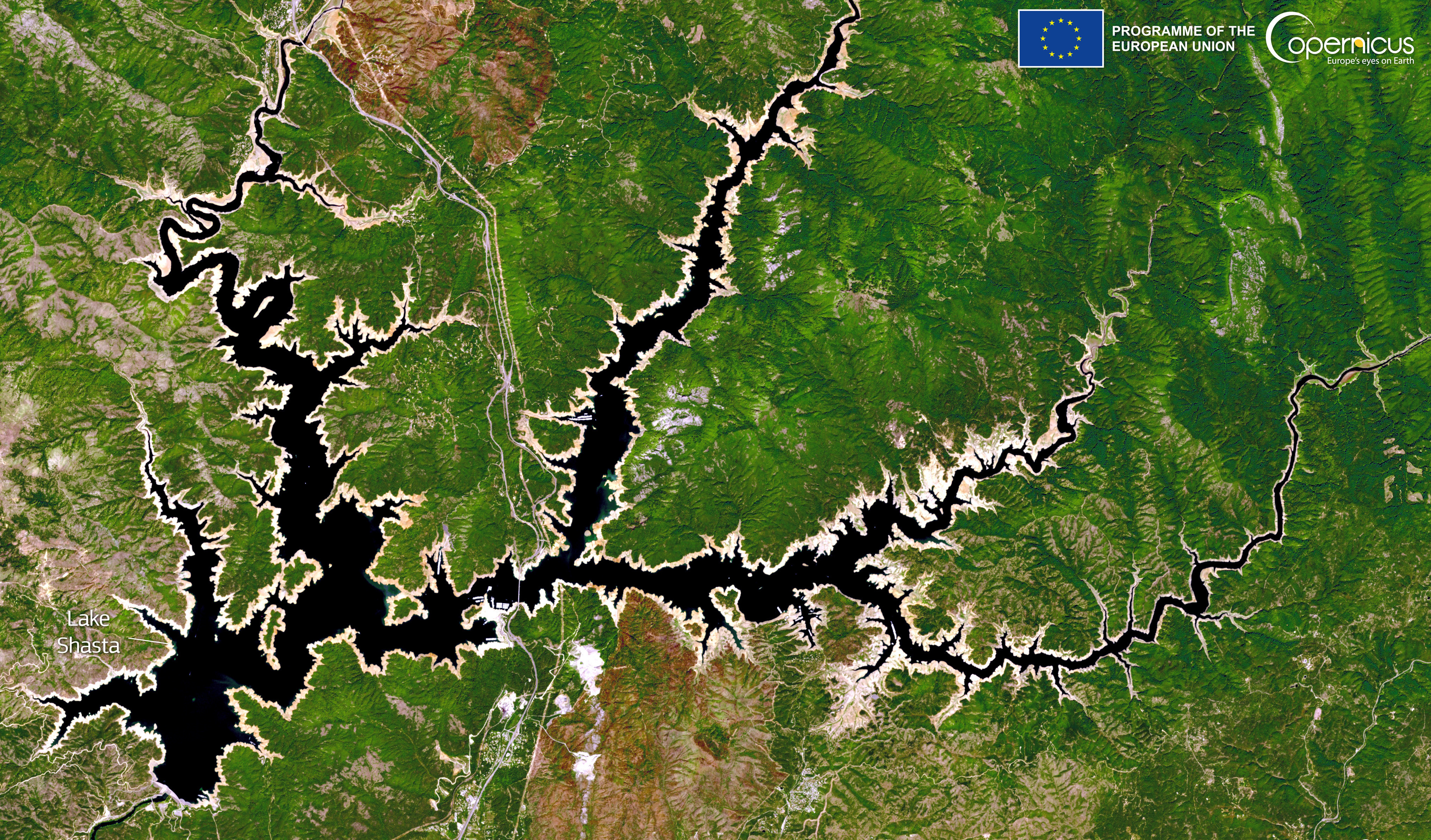
- A Sentinel-2 satellite image of the lake

- Location within California Location within the United States
- Location: Shasta–Trinity National Forest; Shasta County, California
- Coordinates: 40°45′37″N 122°22′19″W
- Type: Reservoir
- Primary inflows: Sacramento River, Pit River, McCloud River
- Primary outflows: Sacramento River
- Basin countries: United States
- Max. length: 35 mi (56 km)
- Surface area: 30,000 acres (12,000 ha)
- Max. depth: 517 ft (158 m)
- Water volume: 4,552,000 acre⋅ft (5.615 km^{3})
- Shore length^{1}: 365 mi (587 km)
- Surface elevation: 1,067 ft (325 m)
- Settlements: Lakehead
- References: U.S. Geological Survey Geographic Names Information System: Lake Shasta
- ^{1} Shore length is not a well-defined measure.

Shasta Lake, also popularly known as Lake Shasta, is a reservoir in Shasta County, California, United States. It began to store water in 1944 due to the impounding of the Sacramento River by Shasta Dam, the ninth-tallest dam in the U.S.

Shasta Lake is a key facility of the Central Valley Project and provides flood control for the Sacramento Valley, downstream of the dam. Water outflow generates power through the Shasta Powerplant and is subsequently used for irrigation and municipal purposes.

The reservoir lies within the Whiskeytown–Shasta–Trinity National Recreation Area, operated by the Shasta–Trinity National Forest.

The California Office of Environmental Health Hazard Assessment (OEHHA) has formed a safe-eating advisory for fish caught in the lake, based on levels of mercury and PCBs found in local species. The Shasta-Keswick Reservoir system is significantly contaminated with heavy metals, primarily due to contributions from four streams. Three of these streams contain acid mine drainage, with Spring Creek being the most notable contributor, releasing high concentrations of cadmium, copper and zinc into the water. At the points where these acid streams mix with lake water, localized toxicity occurs, posing an immediate threat to aquatic life. The synergistic effects of these metals further exacerbate the environmental impact, leading to concerns about the safety of consuming fish from this water source.

== Geography ==
With a capacity of 4,552,000 acre⋅ft (5.615 km^{3}) at full pool, the lake has an elevation of 1,067 ft (325 m), and a surface area of 30,000 acres (12,000 ha), making it the state's largest reservoir, and its third-largest body of water after Lake Tahoe and the Salton Sea.

Ten miles (16 km) north of the city of Redding, with the town of Lakehead on its northern shore, Shasta Lake is popular for boating, water skiing, camping, house boating and fishing. Formed by the damming of the Sacramento River, the lake has 365 mi (587 km) of mostly steep mountainous shoreline covered with tall evergreen trees and manzanita. The maximum depth is 517 feet (158 m).

The lake has four major arms, each created by an approaching river: the Sacramento River, the McCloud River, Sulanharas Creek, and the Pit River. The Sacramento River's source is the Klamath Mountains. The McCloud River's source is Mount Shasta. The Pit River flows from Alturas, and the waterfall Potem Falls is located on that arm of the lake.

== History ==
Shasta Dam was constructed between 1935 and 1945 across the Sacramento River, and Shasta Lake was formed in 1948. The Pit River, McCloud River, and several smaller tributaries had their lower courses and confluences with the Sacramento River submerged by the reservoir. Also beneath the lake is the submerged town of Kennett and many village sites of the Wintun people together with their traditional fishing, hunting, and gathering locations. Parts of the defunct tunnels and right of way of the Southern Pacific Transportation Company can be seen when the water level is low.

Shasta Lake hosted the first "Boardstock" event in 1996, which continued there annually through 1999, after which the annual event moved to Clear Lake, California, 170 miles southwest of Shasta Lake. Boardstock drew many professional wakeboard riders from around the world, with an average attendance of 15,000 people. The event lasted for 3 days each year with multiple wakeboarding competitions.

== Marinas ==
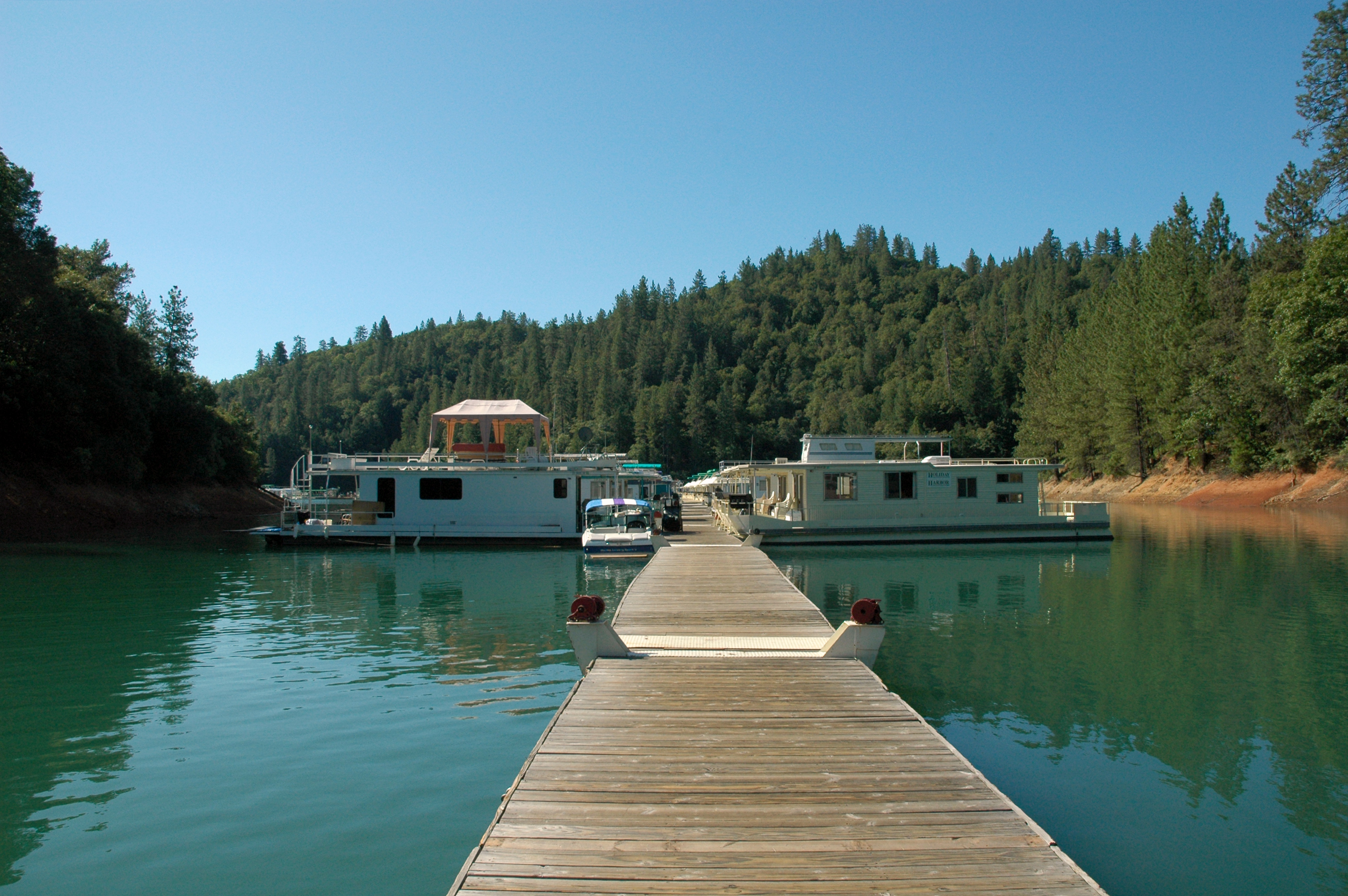
Holiday Harbor marina

There are a number of marinas on Shasta Lake offering a variety of services, including houseboat rentals.

- Bridge Bay Marina is the largest marina on Shasta Lake, with over 700 slips. It has a restaurant and bar and lodging, as well as retail and other facilities. Visitors to Bridge Bay may rent one of 100 houseboats, as well as ski, fishing and patio boats, and personal watercraft, such as standup paddleboards, jet skis and Jetovators. Bridge Bay sees a busy summer season, with a gas dock, food, ice and all retail amenities.
- Digger Bay Marina has over 150 boat slips in the marina, as well as a retail store and small boat rental. It is located about 10 miles from Highway 5.
- Shasta Marina Resort is located off of exit no. 693 from I-5, at 16814 Packers Bay Road, in Lakehead. Offering Large luxurious houseboats, ski and pontoon boats, Sea-Doos, standup paddleboards and kayaks for rent. There is houseboat and covered moorage, and a year-round store with a gas dock, food, ice and gifts.
- Antler's Marina is Shasta's northernmost marina.
- Silverthorn Marina is located on the eastern part of the lake and offers large houseboats for rent.
- Jones Valley Resort is the easternmost marina on the lake, tucked far into a cove, and features six different model rental houseboats, including the largest on the lake, the Titan.
- Holiday Harbor is located up the McCloud River arm, east of I-5.
- Sugarloaf Marina is located up the Sacramento River arm and offers a marina store, overnight slips and fuel.

== Climate ==
Shasta Lake has a hot-summer mediterranean climate (Csa) typical of the interior of Northern California with hot, dry summers and cool, wet winters, along with great diurnal temperature variation.

Climate data for Shasta Dam, California (normals 1981–2010)(extremes 1943–2020)
Month	Jan	Feb	Mar	Apr	May	Jun	Jul	Aug	Sep	Oct	Nov	Dec	Year
Record high °F (°C)	80 (27)	80 (27)	88 (31)	97 (36)	107 (42)	111 (44)	115 (46)	115 (46)	114 (46)	104 (40)	90 (32)	76 (24)	115 (46)
Mean daily maximum °F (°C)	53.0 (11.7)	57.0 (13.9)	62.3 (16.8)	68.6 (20.3)	77.6 (25.3)	86.5 (30.3)	95.3 (35.2)	94.3 (34.6)	88.1 (31.2)	76.0 (24.4)	60.3 (15.7)	52.7 (11.5)	72.6 (22.6)
Daily mean °F (°C)	46.3 (7.9)	49.2 (9.6)	53.0 (11.7)	58.0 (14.4)	66.3 (19.1)	74.5 (23.6)	81.8 (27.7)	80.6 (27.0)	75.2 (24.0)	65.2 (18.4)	52.9 (11.6)	46.3 (7.9)	62.4 (16.9)
Mean daily minimum °F (°C)	39.5 (4.2)	41.4 (5.2)	43.6 (6.4)	47.4 (8.6)	55.0 (12.8)	62.5 (16.9)	68.3 (20.2)	66.8 (19.3)	62.2 (16.8)	54.4 (12.4)	45.4 (7.4)	40.0 (4.4)	52.5 (11.4)
Record low °F (°C)	19 (−7)	21 (−6)	25 (−4)	28 (−2)	35 (2)	38 (3)	50 (10)	44 (7)	43 (6)	34 (1)	30 (−1)	14 (−10)	14 (−10)
Average precipitation inches (mm)	10.84 (275)	11.33 (288)	9.48 (241)	4.75 (121)	3.23 (82)	1.37 (35)	0.20 (5.1)	0.25 (6.4)	1.00 (25)	3.68 (93)	7.63 (194)	12.06 (306)	65.82 (1,672)
Average precipitation days	14	12	12	9	7	3	1	1	3	5	11	14	93
Source: NOAA

== Gallery ==
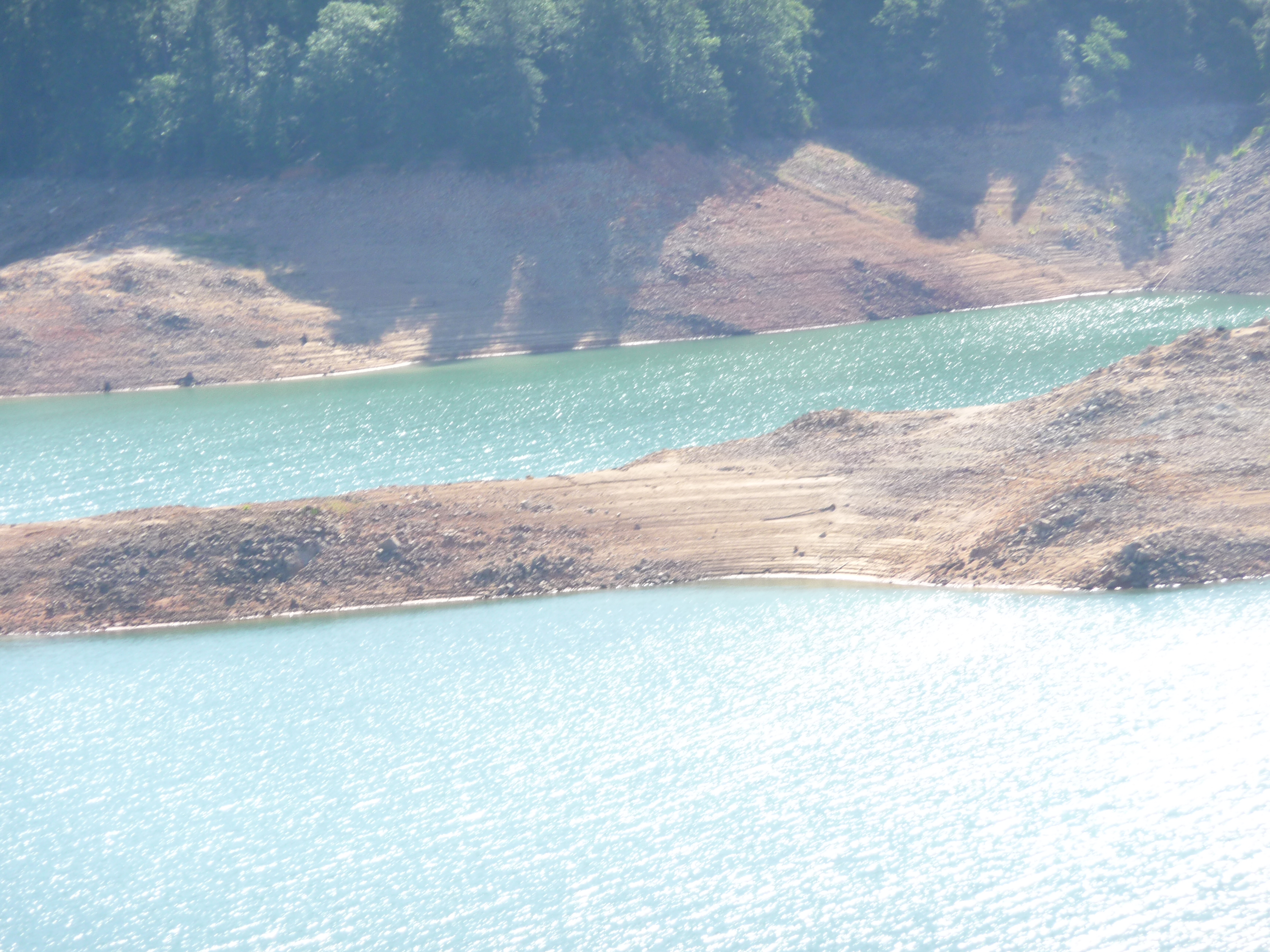
Lake Shasta from I-5

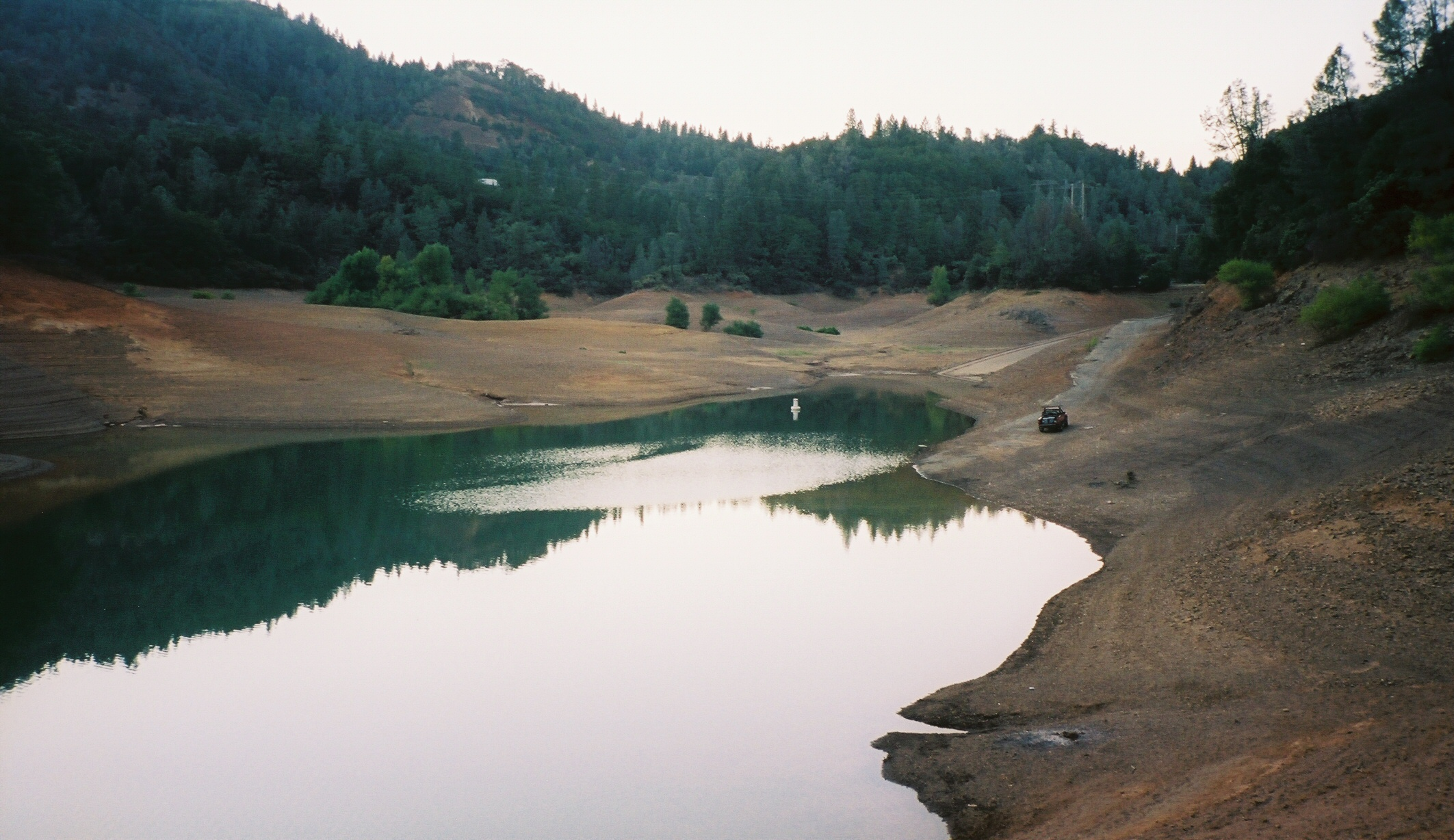
Low waters on Lake Shasta

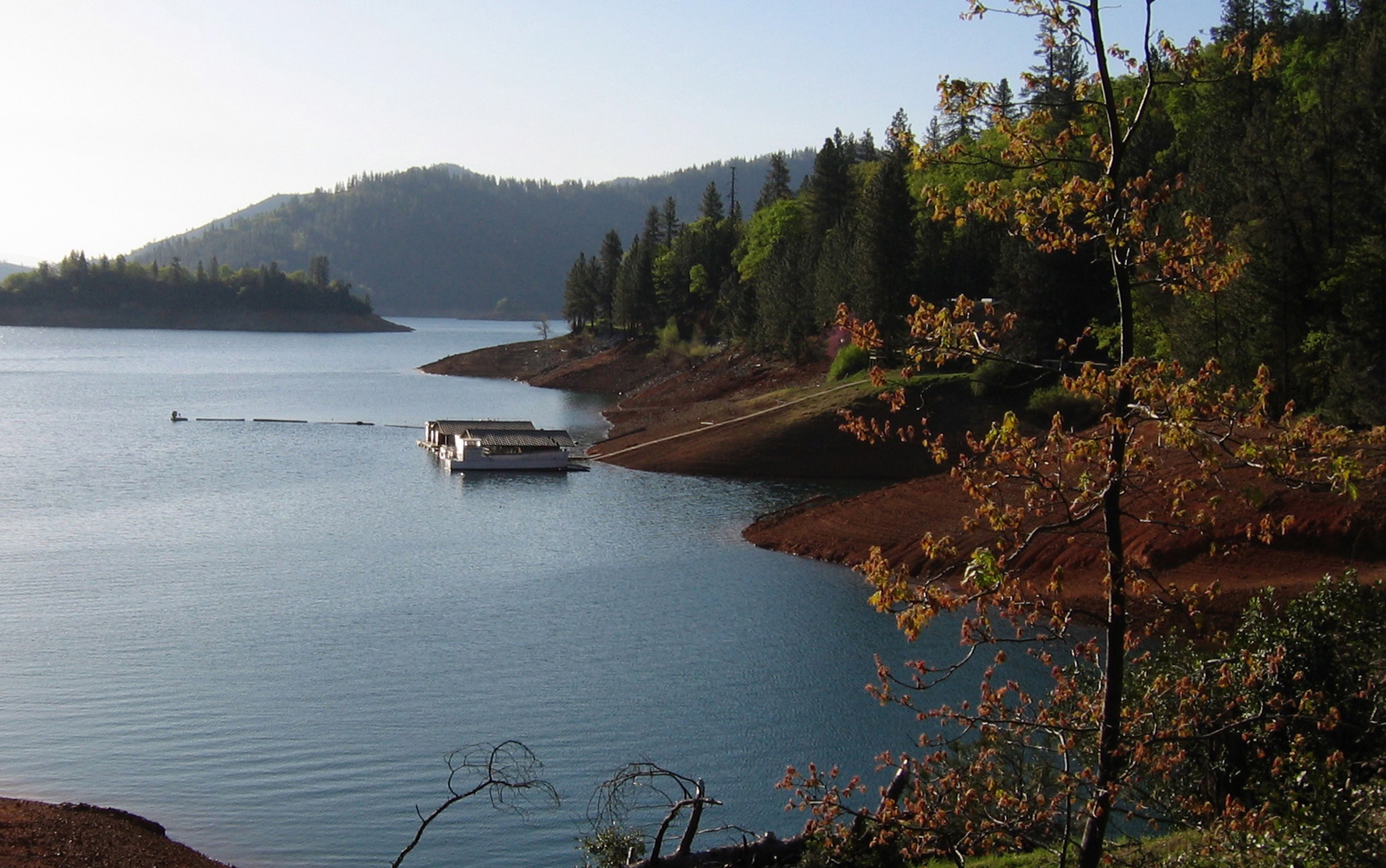
Lake from the shoreline

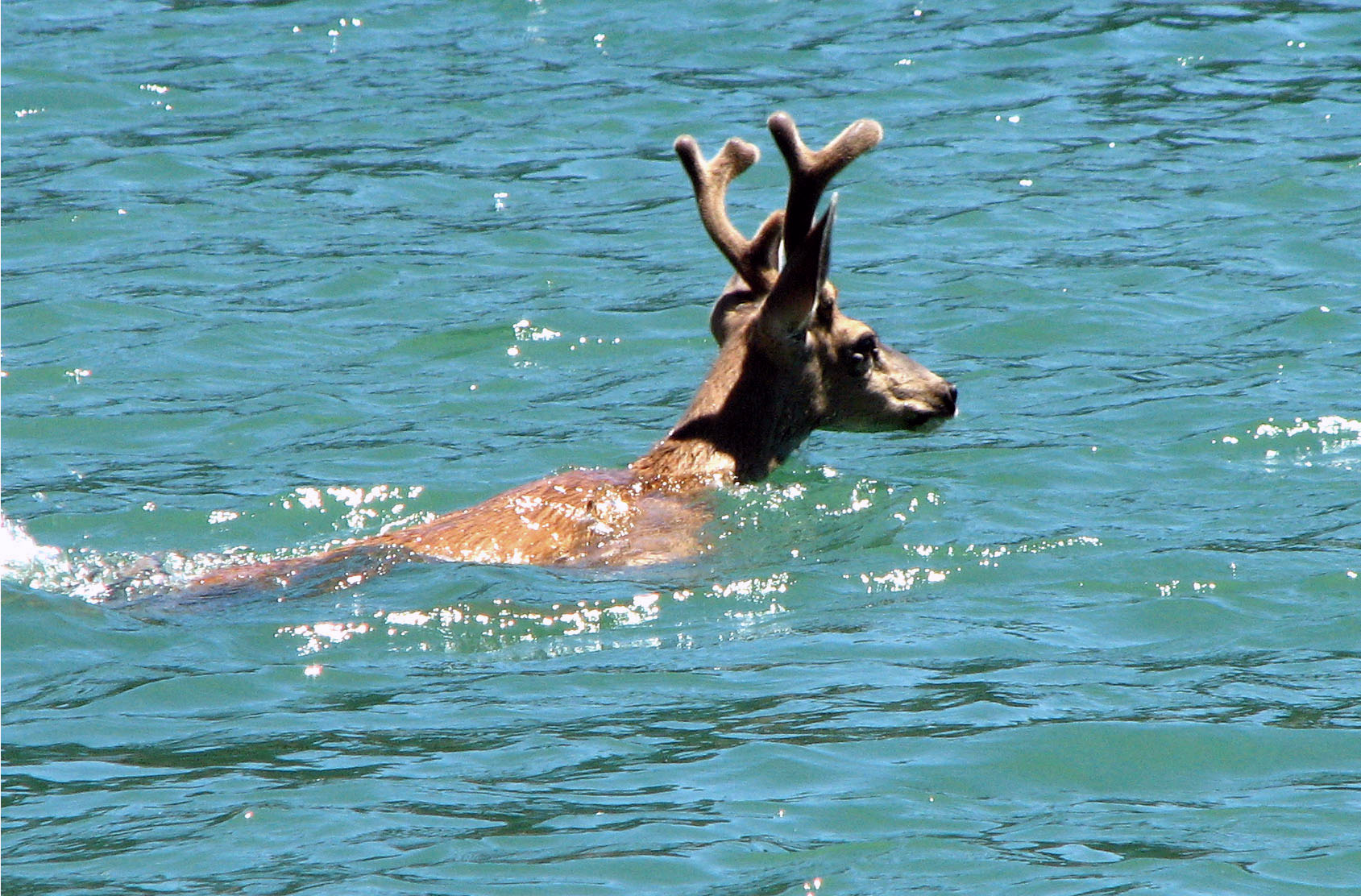
Deer swimming in Lake Shasta

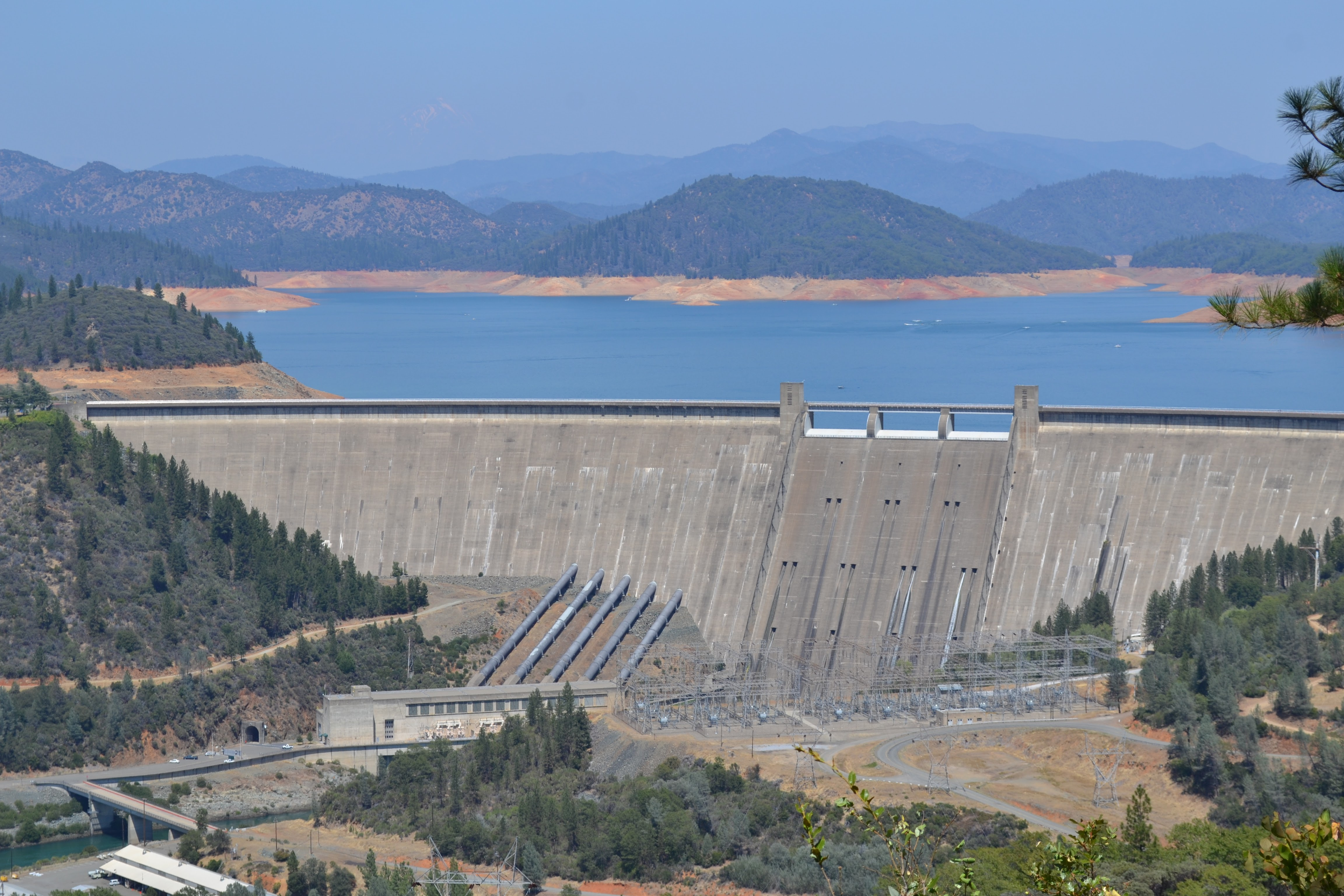
Shasta Lake and Shasta Dam

== See also ==
- Shasta Dam - creates Shasta Lake by impounding the Sacramento River
- Shasta Unit — of the Whiskeytown–Shasta–Trinity National Recreation Area.
- List of dams and reservoirs in California
- List of largest reservoirs of California
- List of lakes of California
