= Kishon River =

Coordinates: 32°49′N 35°02′E

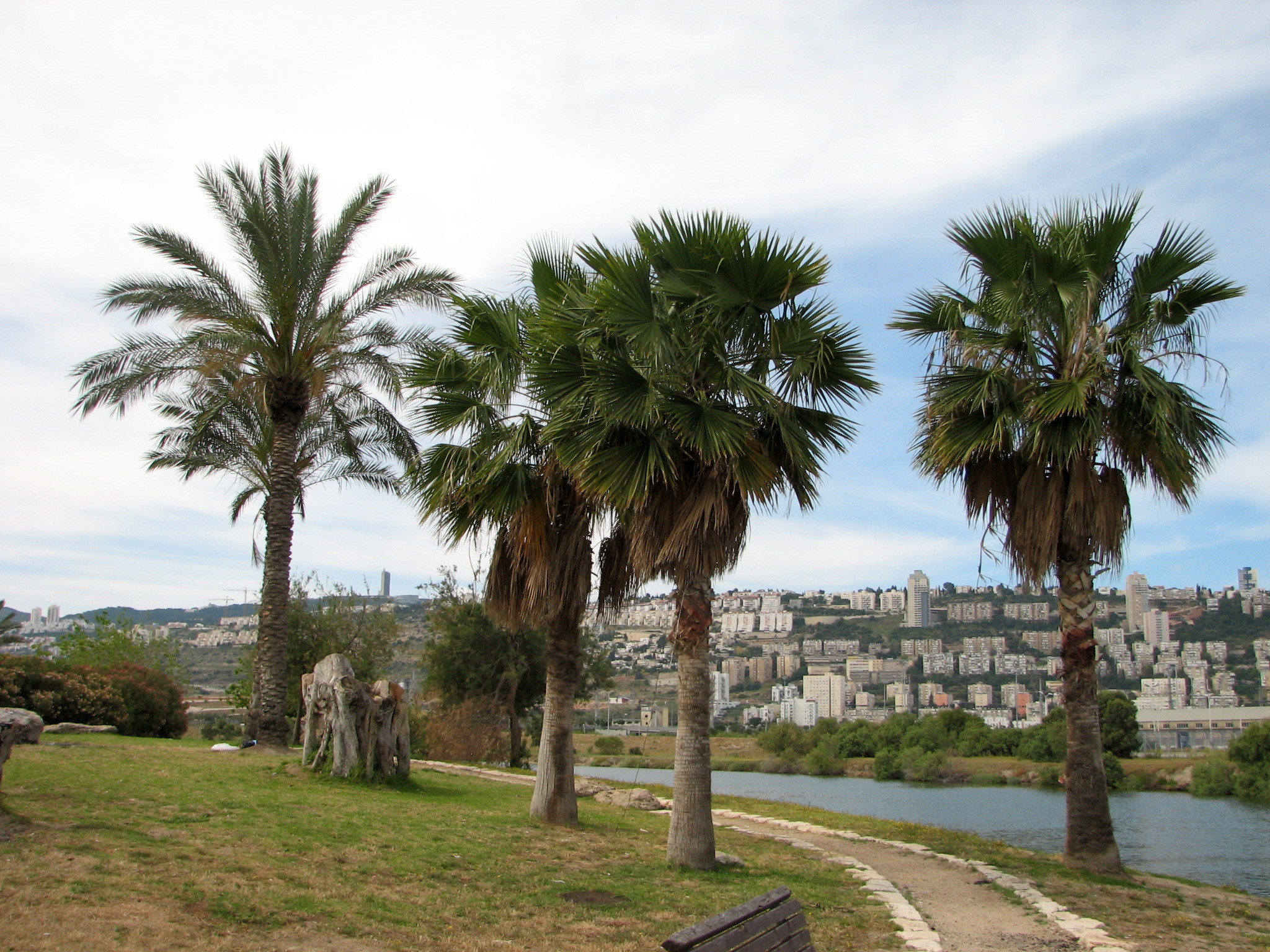
- Kishon River near Haifa in 2010

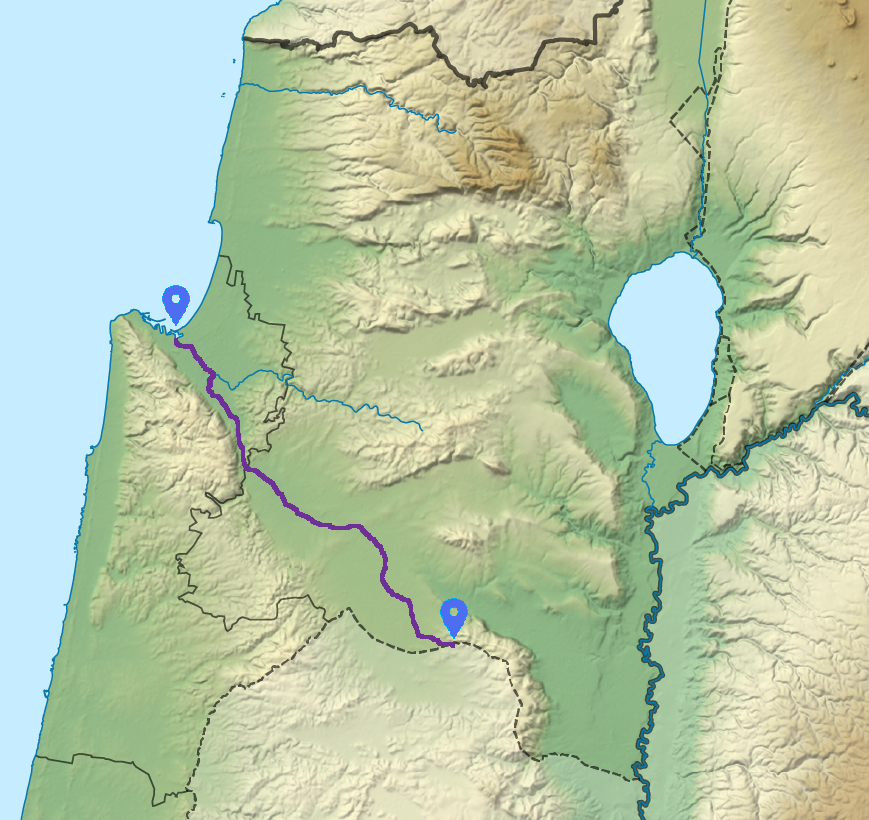
- Native name: נחל הקישון (Hebrew)

Location
- Country: Israel
- District: Haifa District
- City: Haifa

Physical characteristics
- Source: Mount Gilboa
- Mouth: Shefekh haKishon
  - location: Haifa Bay, Mediterranean Sea
- Length: 70 km (43 mi)

Basin features
- Tributaries
  - left: Nahal Nahalal

The Kishon River (Hebrew: נחל הקישון, Nachal HaKishon; Arabic: نهر المقطع, romanized: Nahr al-Muqaṭṭa‘, – the intermittent river; alternative Arabic, الكيشون al-Kīšūn) is a river in Israel that flows into the Mediterranean Sea near the city of Haifa.

== Course ==
The Kishon River is a 70-kilometre-long (43 mi) perennial stream in Israel. Its furthest source is the Gilboa mountains, and it flows in a west-northwesterly direction through the Jezreel Valley, emptying into the Haifa Bay in the Mediterranean Sea. Its drainage basin, of 1,100 square kilometres (420 sq mi), includes much of Jezreel Valley and the Western Galilee, and parts of Mount Carmel.

== Biblical references ==
The Kishon is mentioned six times in the Hebrew Bible, among them the following verses:

- In Judges 4:7, Sisera's Canaanite army is encamped at the Kishon River and the prophet Deborah predicts their defeat; in Judges 5:21, in her song of celebration, the Kishon River is praised for washing away the Canaanite army.
- 1 Kings 18:40 names the Kishon River as the site where the prophets of Baal were executed on Elijah's orders, following Elijah's contest with the prophets of Baal nearby on Mount Carmel (1 Kings 18:20–39).

== Modern history ==
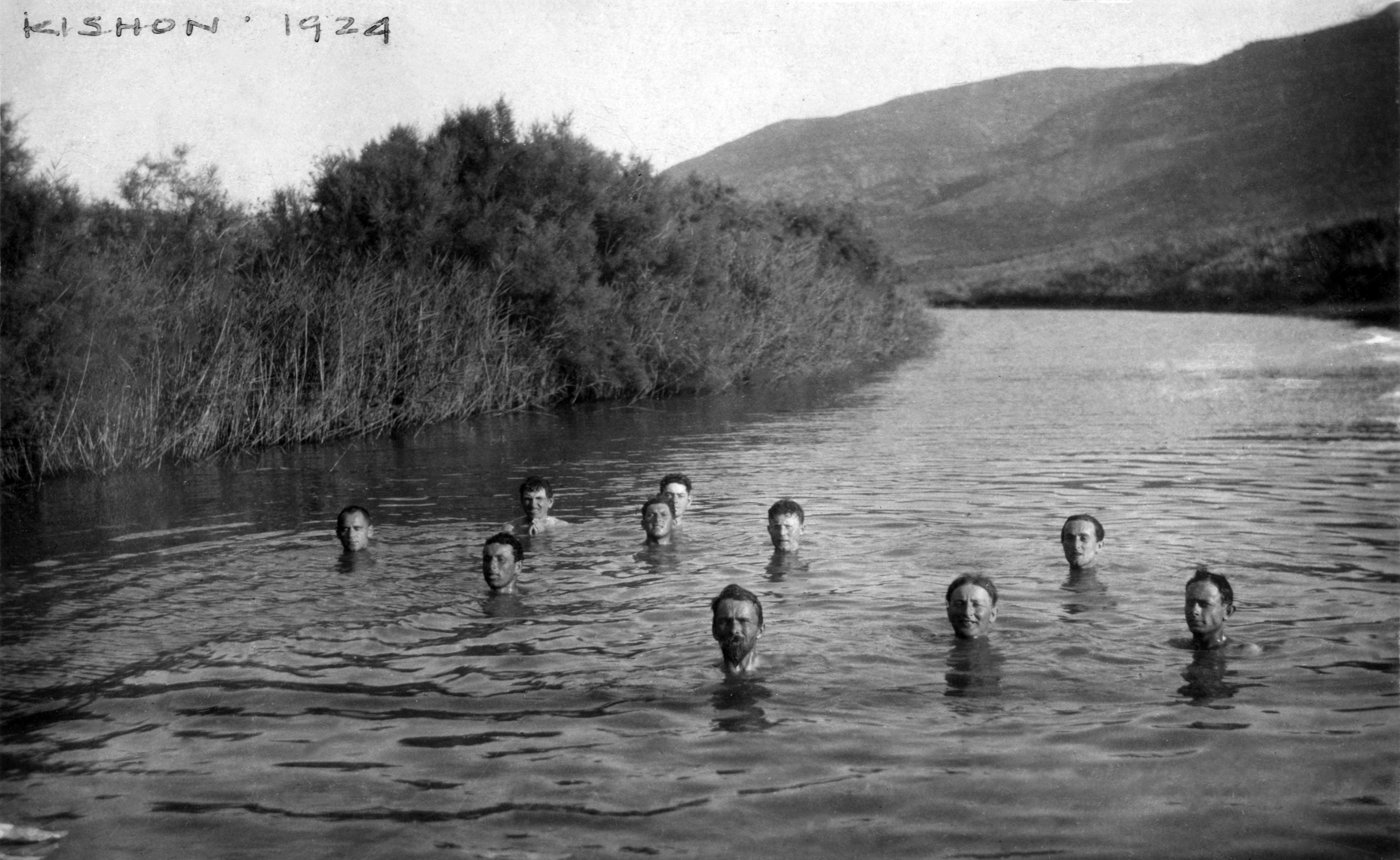
Jewish Halutzim swimming in the Kishon river, 1924 Younes and Soraya Nazarian digital collections, University of Haifa

Following the end of the First World War there was an increase in the number of Jewish settlers arriving in Palestine, the Third Aliyah. Those who arrived at Haifa were kept in a tented Quarantine Camps set up on the Kishon estuary. Many of the immigrants, Halutzim, were infected with malaria for which the area was notorious. Under the British Mandate the area became Haifa's industrial zone with a power station, railway workshops and the Iraq Petroleum Company refinery.

== Pollution ==
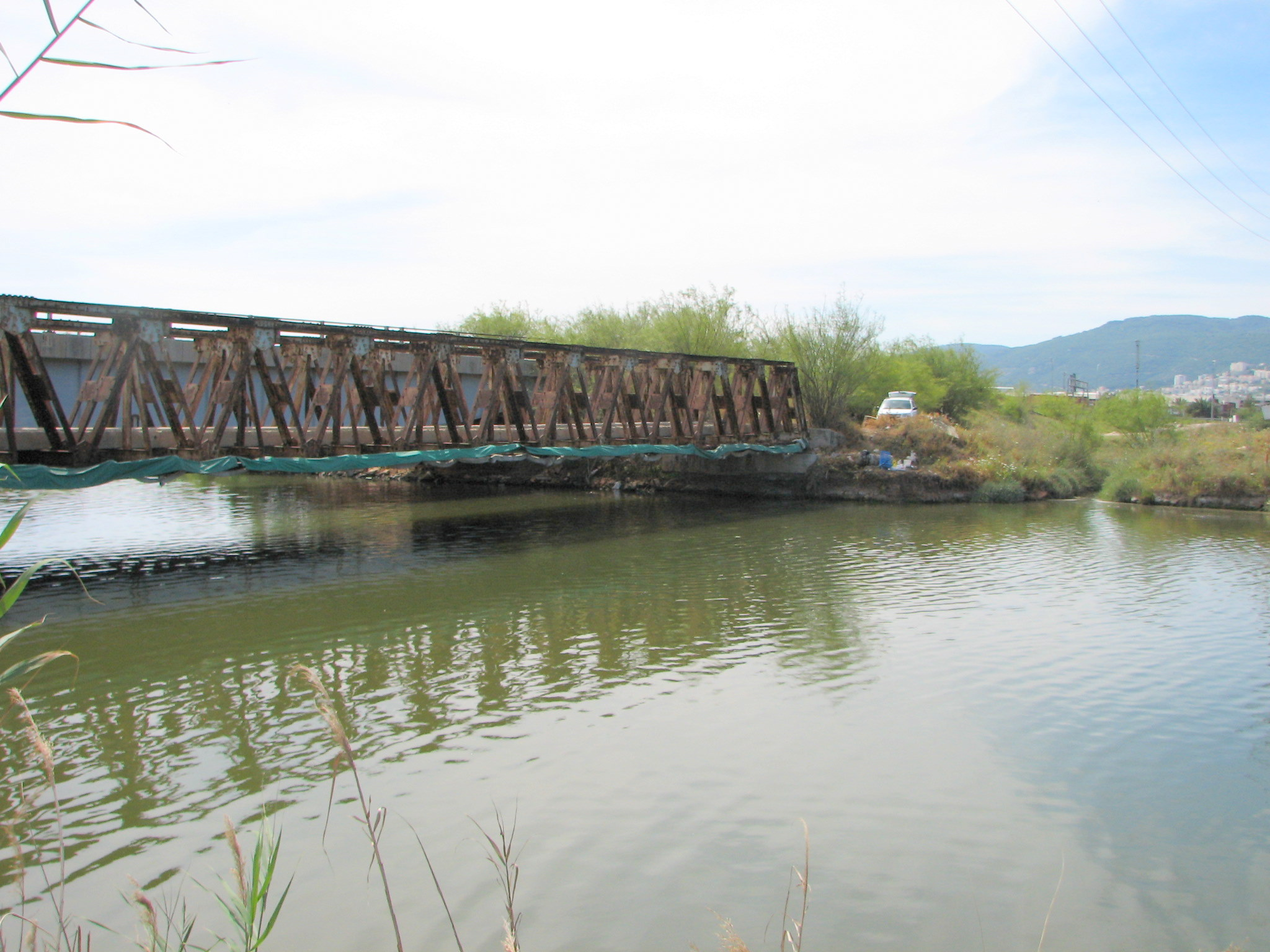
Kishon River after cleanup, 2010

Considered the most polluted river in Israel by several government authorities on the matter, it has been the subject of controversy regarding the struggle to improve the water quality. The pollution stems in part from daily contamination for over 40 years with mercury, other heavy metals, and organic chemicals by nearby chemical plants.

It was claimed in 2000, that there are more chemicals than water in the river, and that washing one's hands in this river can cause severe chemical burns. On several occasions this river (or rather, patches of petrochemical waste on it) has caught fire from the chemical contaminants. Below Histadrut Bridge (Highway 4), after passing the petrochemical industries zone, the pH was 3 or below for most of the time in 2001.

A 2002 study found the ability of 3 hours' exposure to Kishon River water to induce DNA damage in rainbow-trout liver-cells to be on average threefold that of unpolluted water. Notably the lower Kishon, below the petrochemical industry zone, had a markedly elevated genotoxic potential.

A 2000 analysis of the river water revealed chlorinated compounds in discharges from the refineries, the municipal sewage treatment plant and from the Haifa Chemicals fertilizer production plant. Heavy metals were present in the discharges from the Carmel Olefins and Haifa Chemicals plants. The upper river system may also be mixed with genotoxic materials from domestic waste and agricultural runoff that contain pesticides and fertilizers. Potent genotoxins usually found in domestic wastes also include N-nitroso compounds and aromatic amines, which are known to be present in human sanitary outflows as well as genotoxic PAHs found in municipal discharges.

As of January 4, 2016; 1,000,000 cubic meters per year of potable water is added to the Kishon River and had decreased concentrations of salts, nitrates and phosphates, by over 50%. This flow will be replaced by the Jezreel Valley springs, as their flow is removed from irrigation.

=== Cleanup ===
In 2012, the Israeli Ministry of Environmental Protection launched a tender to clean up the Kishon river in a project costing NIS 220 million. Much of the funding for the project came from the companies responsible for the pollution. The Canadian company EnGlobe Corp. began work in 2012 to clean up the river. The cleanup project is to be concluded in 2015.

=== Shayetet 13 ===
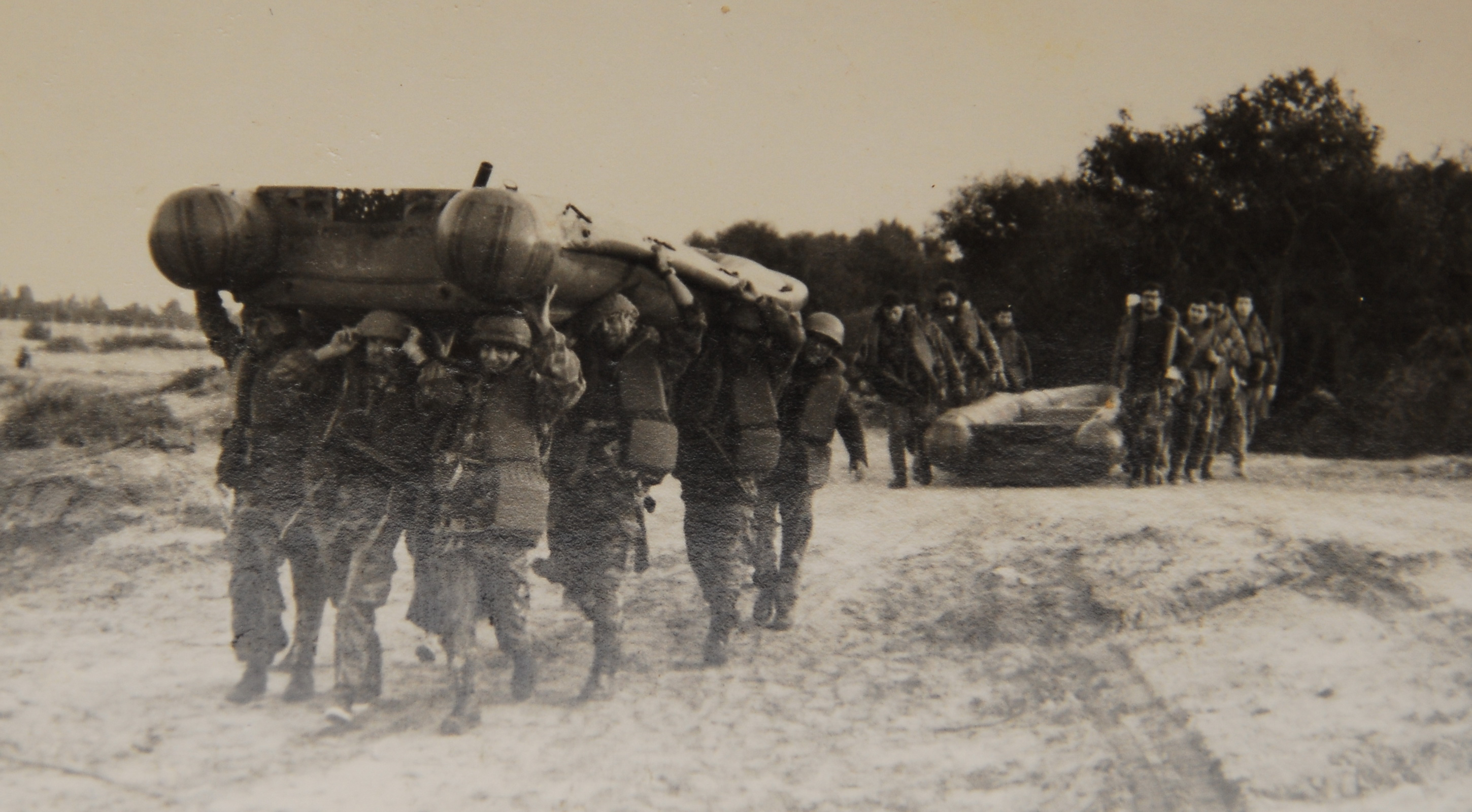
IDF training in the Kishon River, 1969–1970

Since 2001, it was discovered that Shayetet 13 veterans had high occurrence of cancer, probably due to training in the polluted Kishon River and Haifa Bay. A commission for investigating the matter did not find statistical evidence that diving in the Kishon caused the cancers. However, despite the commission findings, the Defense Ministry decided to compensate select litigants. A new probe initiated in December 2021 concluded in February 2022 that the veterans had been exposed to a high amount of toxic chemicals, and it was subsequently decided to provide compensation to anyone who had trained in the Kishon River and fallen ill.

== See also ==
- List of most-polluted rivers
- List of rivers of Israel
