= Ghadir River =

River in Lebanon

- Location of mouth
- Native name: نهر الغدير (Arabic)

Location
- Country: Lebanon

Physical characteristics
- Mouth
  - location: Mediterranean Sea
  - coordinates: 33°49′11″N 35°29′46″E

The Ghadir River (Arabic: نهر الغدير, romanized: Nahr Al-Ghadir), meaning rivulet, is one of the smallest rivers in Lebanon located in the southern Beirut region. The river is formed by seasonal streams that form from rain in the Baabda district. The river passes through the areas of Choueifat, Kfarshima, Hay El Sellom and flows into the Mediterranean Sea south of Beirut, under the Beirut International Airport. It dries up totally during summer.

The Ghadir is the most polluted river in Lebanon. Although it has been polluted since the early 1990s, in 2017, the minister of public works Youssef Fenianos said that the water of the Ghadir was no longer normal water, it was sewage water.

In its lower section, Al‐Ghadir River is connected to the Ghadir wastewater treatment plant as it acts as a sewerage and storm water conveyor. The river has turned into a sewerage because many households and industries located along it discharge untreated wastewater directly into it. Example of such industries include tile factories and sand washing plants

== Historical background ==
Before the 1950s, Ghadir River landscape was mostly agricultural. The Sahra Choueifat area, which the river passes through, was known for its olive groves that according to its long-time residents produced the highest quality of olive oil. Residents of the area also recall that they used to sit alongside the river and swim and enjoy its clean water, one resident remembered that he used to put a watermelon in the river to let it get cold, a common habit in river picnics in Lebanon. Long-term residents of the area also remember that on weekends Beirut families used to gather along the river. At that time, the area was also known for its agro-industrial activities with olive pressers and watermills for wheat located along the riverbanks.

Over time, the area slowly transformed from an agricultural landscape into a residential and industrial one. In the period between 1950 and 1975, two major events caused a shift in the landscape of the area surrounding the Ghadir River. First, the area became more residential due to a wave of rural-urban migration from the Beqaa to the Sahraa Choueifat area. Second, the Choueifat and Kfarshima witnessed construction of large factories and intensification of industrial activities especially along the riverbanks after both areas have been classified as industrial zones in the plan for the Greater Beirut Area

During the civil war period between 1975 and 1990, rural-urban migration waves continued, as families from the Beqaa region sought employment in Beirut's peripheries. The Hayy El-Sellom neighborhood, which the river passes through, witnessed the arrival of many waves of war refugees and rural migrants, up until 1975 it had around 500 families whereas in the year 2000 it had an estimated 120,000 inhabitants. The area in the vicinity of the Beirut airport, that's in close proximity to the river started to be occupied through informal housing, which in turn attracted low-income families. With the escalation of warfare on different occasions in 1976, 1978, and 1982 waves of displacement followed which contributed to the increase in the area's population and led to the establishment of a housing market the areas close to the Al-Ghadir river.

== Impact of the river's pollution ==
Generally, the Ghadir River dries up in the summer, however, every winter rainwater mixes with wastewater, which carries with it industrial and household waste in addition to agricultural soill coming down from the hills of Choueifat. The river often floods, and the sewage water fills the streets leading many of the residents to leave their homes, however many of the resident cannot afford to do so which creates another wave of displacement along class lines.

Residents living close to the river complain a lot about the poor levels of services. Residents of Hayy El-Sellom for instance are alarmed by the health risks associated with living close to the Ghadir River. Many believe, that the high rates of asthmatic and skin diseases, that are found mostly in children are caused in part by the Ghadir River that collects high percentages of industrial waste before it passes through their neighborhoods. Moreover, since many of the residents live in metal houses and in houses with weak infrastructure, their homes are flooded seasonally by the polluted water of the river. In addition to health threats, residents nearby the river complain about threats to safety; one woman explained how her child drowned when the river overflowed during one winter.
