= Iron Mountain Mine =

Mine in California, United States

- Superfund site
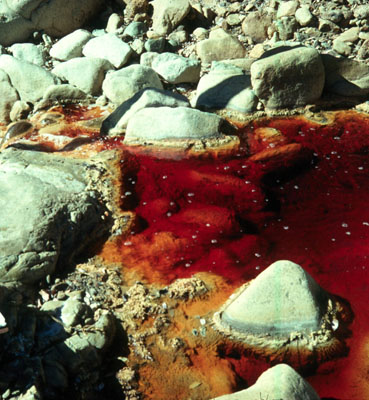
- Drainage from the Iron Mountain Mine

- Location within California
- Location: Shasta County, California; 40°40′20″N 122°31′40″W

Information
- CERCLIS ID: CAD980498612
- Contaminants: Sulfuric acid, copper, zinc and cadmium
- Responsible parties: AventisCrop Sciences, Iron Mountain Mines, Inc., Mr. T. W. Arman

Progress
- Proposed: December 30, 1982
- Listed: September 8, 1983

Iron Mountain Mine, also known as the Richmond Mine at Iron Mountain, is a mine near Redding in Northern California, US. Geologically classified as a "massive sulfide ore deposit", the site was mined for iron, silver, gold, copper, zinc, quartz, and pyrite intermittently from the 1860s until 1963. The mine is the source of extremely acidic mine drainage which also contains large amounts of zinc, copper, and cadmium. One of America's most toxic waste sites, it has been listed as a federal Superfund site since 1983.

== History ==
The extensive gossan at Iron Mountain was first located as an iron mine in the early 1860s by surveyor William Magee and settler Charles Camden, though it was not until James Sallee discovered silver nearby c.1879 that it attracted widespread interest. At its peak, over two hundred stamp mills were in operation; the site was mined by the Mountain Copper Company, Ltd., underground using open stope mining techniques and at the surface through open pit and sidehill mining. As a result, the mountain fractured and mineral deposits were exposed to oxygen, water, and certain bacteria, resulting in acidic mine drainage.

Though mining operations were discontinued in 1963, underground mine workings, waste rock dumps, piles of mine tailings, and an open mine pit still remain at the site.

The mine was designated a Superfund site in 1983, and a water treatment plant was built in 1994. In 2000, the government reached a settlement with Aventis CropScience, now part of Bayer, for the long-term funding of cleanup efforts. Aventis, formerly known as Rhône-Poulenc, acquired Stauffer Chemical in 1987. Stauffer had purchased Mountain Copper Company in 1968 and, in doing so, assumed the company's liabilities including the cleanup.

== Location and drainage ==
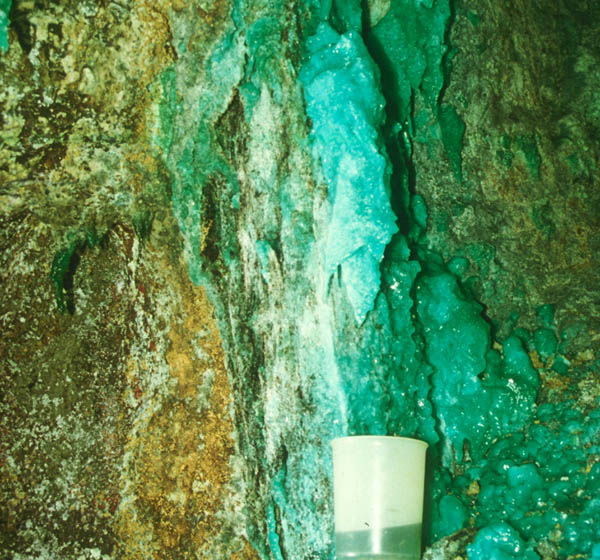
Collecting drainage in the Iron Mountain Mine

The mine is located at 40°40′20″N 122°31′40″W in the Klamath Mountains of Shasta County, about 9 miles northwest of Redding. The mine area is drained by several creeks which ultimately enter the Spring Creek Reservoir, formed by the Spring Creek Dam, and finally the Keswick Reservoir formed by a dam across the Sacramento River.

Historic mining activity at the site has fractured the mountain, exposing minerals in the mountain to surface water, rainwater, and oxygen. When pyrite is exposed to moisture and oxygen, sulfuric acid forms. This sulfuric acid runs through the mountain and leaches out copper, cadmium, zinc, and other heavy metals. This acid flows out of the seeps and portals of the mine. Much of the acidic mine drainage ultimately is channelled into the Spring Creek Reservoir by creeks surrounding the mine. The Bureau of Reclamation periodically releases the stored acid mine drainage into Keswick Reservoir. Planned releases are timed to coincide with the presence of diluting releases of water from Shasta Dam. On occasion, uncontrolled spills and excessive waste releases have occurred when Spring Creek Reservoir reached capacity. Without sufficient dilution, this results in the release of harmful quantities of heavy metals into the Sacramento River. Approximately 70,000 people use surface water within 3 miles as their source of drinking water. The low pH level and the heavy metal contamination from the mine have caused the virtual elimination of aquatic life in sections of Slickrock Creek, Boulder Creek, and Spring Creek.

The drainage water from the Iron Mountain Mine is the most acidic water naturally found on Earth; some samples collected in 1990 and 1991 have been measured to have a pH value of -3.6. Water temperatures as high as 47 °C have been measured underground.

The drainage water endangers fish, including winter-run Chinook salmon, a federally listed endangered species that spawns in the Sacramento River. Salmon kills have been noted since 1899.

The mine opening contains huge stalactite-stalagmite structures that span from floor to ceiling and are composed of rhomboclase and other iron sulfate minerals.

== Bacteria and archaea ==
The bacteria and archaea living in the mine such as Leptospirillum (bacteria) and Ferroplasma (archaea) are of interest because they can survive in this extreme environment, and because their metabolism contributes to the pollution. They form a pink biofilm several millimeters thick that floats on the surface of the hot water with a pH of 0.8. Since the bacteria cannot be isolated and cultured, scientists have performed community sequencing of the DNA of the five dominant species at once, assembling the genomes afterwards. Four new species were identified in this way in 2004. In 2005, the proteins produced by these bacteria were identified; of the 2033 found proteins 572 were unique to this biofilm. In 2006, Baker identified three novel archaea, the Archaeal Richmond Mine Acidophilic Nanoorganisms.

The bacteria obtain carbon from the air's carbon dioxide and nitrogen from the air's N_{2} gas. They are aerobes and obtain energy by using oxygen to oxidize ferrous iron dissolved from the iron sulfide rock; in the process they produce sulfuric acid which releases more metals from the rock. The bacteria belong to the group of acidophilic ferrous iron oxidizers.

== See also ==
- List of Superfund sites in California
- Acidophiles in acid mine drainage
