= Spring Creek Dam =

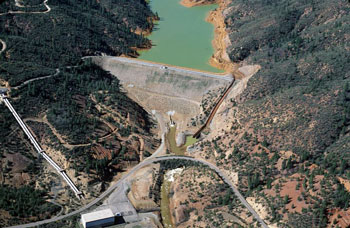
- Interactive map of Spring Creek Dam
- Official name: Spring Creek Debris Dam
- Location: Shasta-Trinity National Forest; Shasta County, California
- Coordinates: 40.6298°N 122.4741°W
- Construction began: 1961; 65 years ago
- Opening date: 1963; 63 years ago
- Operator: Bureau of Reclamation

Dam and spillways
- Impounds: Spring Creek
- Height: 196 ft (60 m)
- Length: 1,110 ft (340 m)
- Spillway type: Uncontrolled concrete overflow
- Spillway capacity: 5,260 cubic feet per second (149 m^{3}/s)

Reservoir
- Creates: Spring Creek Reservoir
- Total capacity: 5,870 acre⋅ft (7,240 dam^{3})
- Catchment area: 16 mi^{2} (41 km^{2})

Power Station
- Turbines: 2x 90 MW Francis turbines
- Installed capacity: 150 MW; 180 MW (max)

Spring Creek Debris Dam is an earthfill dam on Spring Creek, a tributary of the Sacramento River, in Shasta County in the U.S. state of California. Completed in 1963, the dam, maintained by the U.S. Bureau of Reclamation, serves primarily to collect severe acid mine drainage stemming from the Iron Mountain Mine. The dam forms the Spring Creek Reservoir, less than 1 mile (1.6 km) long. Spring Creek and South Fork Spring Creek flow into the reservoir from a 16-square-mile (41 km^{2}) watershed. The dam is directly upstream from the city of Keswick, California and the Keswick Reservoir. The operation is part of the Trinity River Division of the Central Valley Project.

The primary purpose of the Spring Creek Dam was to collect acid mine drainage from the old Iron Mountain Mine, which was heavily polluting Spring Creek and its tributaries. The dam was built in response to these pollutants that were contaminating the Sacramento River, the primary water supply for millions of Californians. Although the watershed is small in comparison to that of the Sacramento River, the stream is among the most polluted and acidic in the world.

The dam and reservoir, along with other treatment structures built at and below the mine, have successfully reduced the dry weather pollution of Spring Creek by up to ninety-five percent. Problems, though, still occur mainly in the form of large uncontrolled spills from the reservoir. Several concerns about the structural integrity and safety of the dam, both physically and biologically, arose in the 1990s. Emergency releases from Shasta Lake, often in the value of thousands of acre feet of water, have occurred from time to time to dilute massive acid spills from the Spring Creek drainage.

== History ==
=== Mining ===
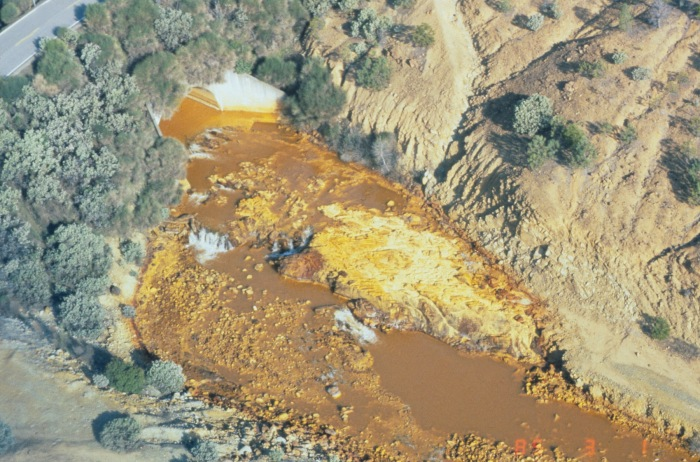
Acid mine drainage from mine tailings in Iron Mountain Mine is clearly visible in the rust-stained color of the creek.

The Iron Mountain Mine, the most productive copper mine in California in at least one point along its history, operated along the banks of two Spring Creek tributaries, upstream from the current dam site, from 1879 to the 1960s. The mine extracted iron ore, silver, gold, copper sulfide ore, and pyrite from a rock formation dating to approximately 780,000 years ago. The potential of a mine at the site was discovered in 1860, when two men, surveyor William Magee and settler Charles Camden, discovered an extensive iron ore deposit along one of the tributaries of Spring Creek. In 1879, silver was also discovered at the site, and the mine was begun. The ownership was transferred to Mountain Mines Ltd., a London company, in 1894. At the very end of the 19th century, Iron Mountain Mine took blames for several fish kills in the Sacramento River. Nevertheless, mining activity continued, and by 1928, 600 tons of ore were being extracted from the site per day.

The still continuing problem of Iron Mountain Mine runoff has once been described as:

...[acid mine drainage is] most vividly illustrated by the problems at the Iron Mountain Mine in California.

...release of this waste resulted in virtual elimination of aquatic life in many of the creeks surrounding the Iron Mountain Mine site.

...work is continuing on what is possibly the largest and most difficult acid mine drainage problem in the United States.

-P. Aarne Vesilind. Controlling Environmental Pollution, 2005

=== Events prompting construction ===
The construction of Shasta Dam and its afterbay (regulating downstream dam), Keswick Dam, in 1943 and 1950, respectively, severely impaired the capability of the Sacramento River to flush away pollutants from the mine. Acid mine drainage flowed, unfettered, down Spring Creek directly into the Keswick Reservoir, depositing contaminated sediment and turning a portion of the water a rusty red shade. Previously, the water would have continued down the creek into the river, and flushed to the Pacific Ocean. The pooling of the water, however, made it extremely difficult for the pollutants to be removed. From 1955 to 1962, open pit mining began on the site. At its peak, the mine discharged 5 tons of iron, 650 pounds (290 kg) of copper, and 1,800 pounds (820 kg) of zinc into the stream per day. By then, the water flowing down the drainage was so contaminated that it necessitated the construction of a holding dam, the Spring Creek Dam.

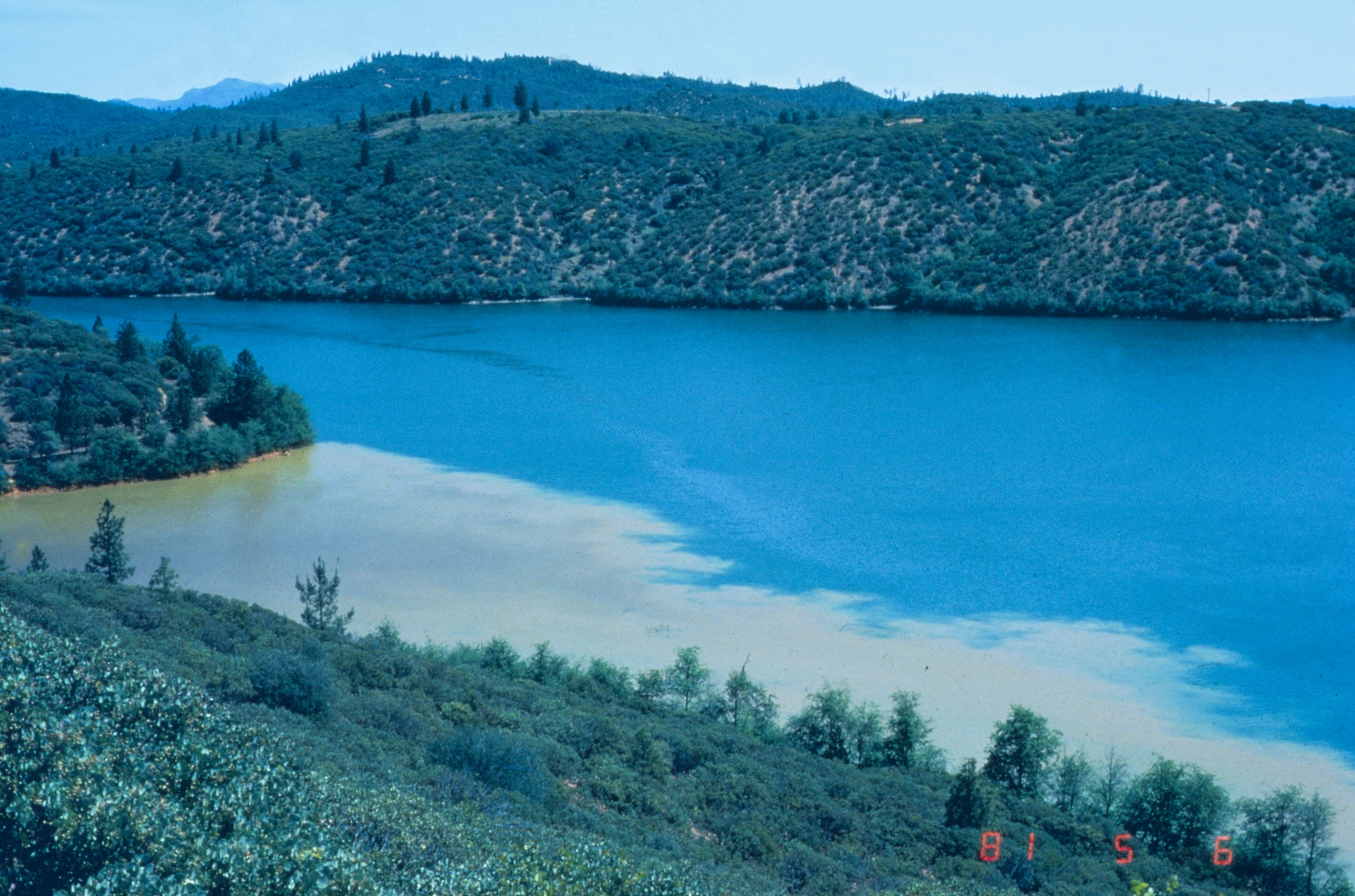
Contaminated sludge draining from Spring Creek into the Keswick Reservoir created this change in hue of the surface.

Spring Creek Dam was begun in 1961, when a company named Gibbons and Reed was awarded the contract. The clearing operations began in July of that same year, and the dam was officially dedicated by the Bureau of Reclamation on September 12, 1961. Construction of the dam began on October 20, 1961, with the placing of the dam embankment, which at least partially consists of acidic sediment dredged from Spring Creek. Riprap was laid on the upstream face of the dam beginning November 9 of that year. In 1962, a series of labor strikes impacted communities in the Central Valley, also affecting construction of the dam, which was temporarily halted on May 3 of that year. After work restarted on June 26, pervious core material for the dam was soon out of supply, so impervious material was used to complete the dam core.

Eventually, the Iron Mountain Mine closed, but pollution continued and still continues, and in 1983, the Iron Mountain Mine was listed on the National Priorities List. The Iron Mountain Mine is known for having the most acidic naturally found water content on Earth, with samples having up to a −3.6 pH value when tested in the early 1990s, which is roughly 100 times the acidity of battery acid. However, this pH value is only found inside and near the mine, as the average pH of water entering the Spring Creek Reservoir is 4.12.

=== Storage expansion ===
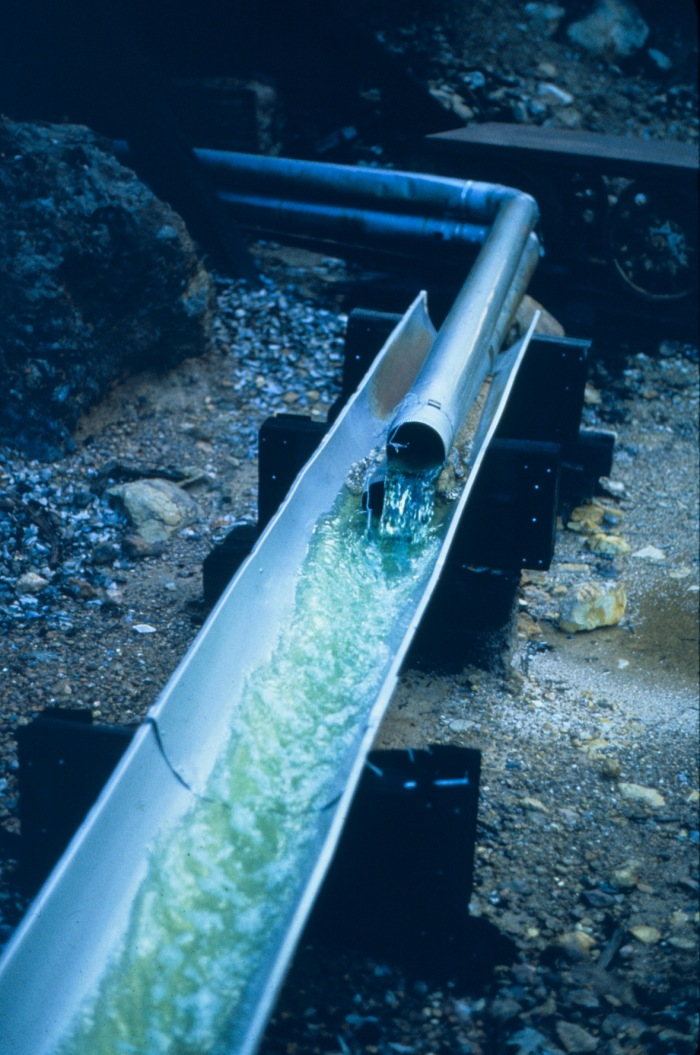
Acid mine drainage, often having a pH level lower than 1, pours constantly from the Iron Mountain Mine through flumes and pipes.

The Spring Creek Dam was later deemed "undersized" for the Spring Creek watershed, as the large flows of both natural drainage and acid mine drainage caused frequent uncontrollable spills at the dam. The spills contain many volatile components in acid mine drainage, which include the most acidic naturally occurring (i.e. not in a laboratory) water on Earth. Several alternatives were considered for remediating this problem:

- Enlarge the Spring Creek Dam to create a reservoir three times its original size: This plan was considered, but never built, as the cost of it was estimated at US$75 million.
- Partial capping (covering) of the site: The ore body in Iron Mountain was determined to be shallow, so this alternative was considered. However, the recurring high occurrence of fractures in the mountain made this inefficient, so it was also never implemented.
- Construction of dams upstream: This proposal called for several dams upstream that would "reduce the watershed by 40 percent", including a dam on Slickrock Creek, a branch of Spring Creek. This plan was implemented, removing the need for the dam enlargement.
- Waste rock removal: Rock extracted from the mine was removed from tailings piles and disposed of in a compacted cell. In Boulder Creek, another tributary of Spring Creek, the acidity level has lowered slightly.

=== Recent history ===
In 1985, it was found that water seepage into the foundations of the Spring Creek Dam could possibly cause its collapse. Shortly after the discovery, a controversy over the irregular spills of mine toxins from the dam began in the 1990s. Two years later, in March 1992, an uncontrolled, unexpected spill of acidic water rushed from the dam down Spring Creek. This spill heavily contaminated the Keswick Reservoir and threatened the water supply of Redding, California. Despite the fact that the region was suffering from a drought, 77,000 acre-feet (95,000 dam^{3}) of water were released from Shasta Lake, which was only half full, to dilute the pollution. The loss of the water, which was badly needed by Central Valley agricultural users, was estimated at US$18 million.

A water treatment plant was built on a site named Minnesota Flats near the Iron Mountain Mine, using lime to balance the pH of the acid mine drainage. Water is also diverted from Slickrock Creek to the treatment site. Altogether, over 95 percent of toxins in the water are removed by the treatment process. Roughly 8.5 miles (13.7 km) of specialized acid-resistant pipeline, with a cost of over US$1 million per mile, are included in the treatment process. Most water flowing directly from the mine has a pH level close to 1; the −3.2 pH mentioned earlier is only found in small amounts. Water is further diluted by natural flow in the tributaries and water diverted from nearby Clear Creek, however, the acidic water still requires treatment.

== Hydrography ==
Spring Creek is a southeast-flowing, 9-mile (14 km) long tributary of the Sacramento River, receiving water from approximately 16 square miles (41 km^{2}) of land. The creek begins in the Klamath Mountains above the Sacramento River drainage, and flows in a generally south-east direction before turning south and sharply west into the Spring Creek Reservoir. From the reservoir, it continues due west until it empties directly into an arm of the Keswick Reservoir. The creek never actually runs by the mine. The acid mine drainage found in the creek is actually carried in by two smaller tributaries, which are Boulder Creek and Slickrock Creek. The former stream runs southeast from the north side of Iron Mountain Mine to Spring Creek, while the latter stream drains the south side of the mine and also flows southeast into Spring Creek. South Fork Spring Creek is a small tributary that flows west and north the Spring Creek Reservoir, but since its basin lies far from the mine, it receives no acid mine drainage. The inflow and outflow from the reservoir are highly erratic, ranging from 0 cubic feet (0 m^{3}) per second to roughly 225 cubic feet (6.4 m^{3}) per second in a particular 10-day period from March to April.

Flat Creek, a small southeast-flowing stream, rises in two forks and empties into the Sacramento River upstream of Spring Creek. The stream receives contaminated runoff from the Minnesota Flats Tailing Pile, but is not nearly as polluted or acidic as Spring Creek. Another stream, Rock Creek, rises in three forks and flows east to meet the Sacramento River downstream of Spring Creek and the Keswick Reservoir.

== Dimensions and operations ==
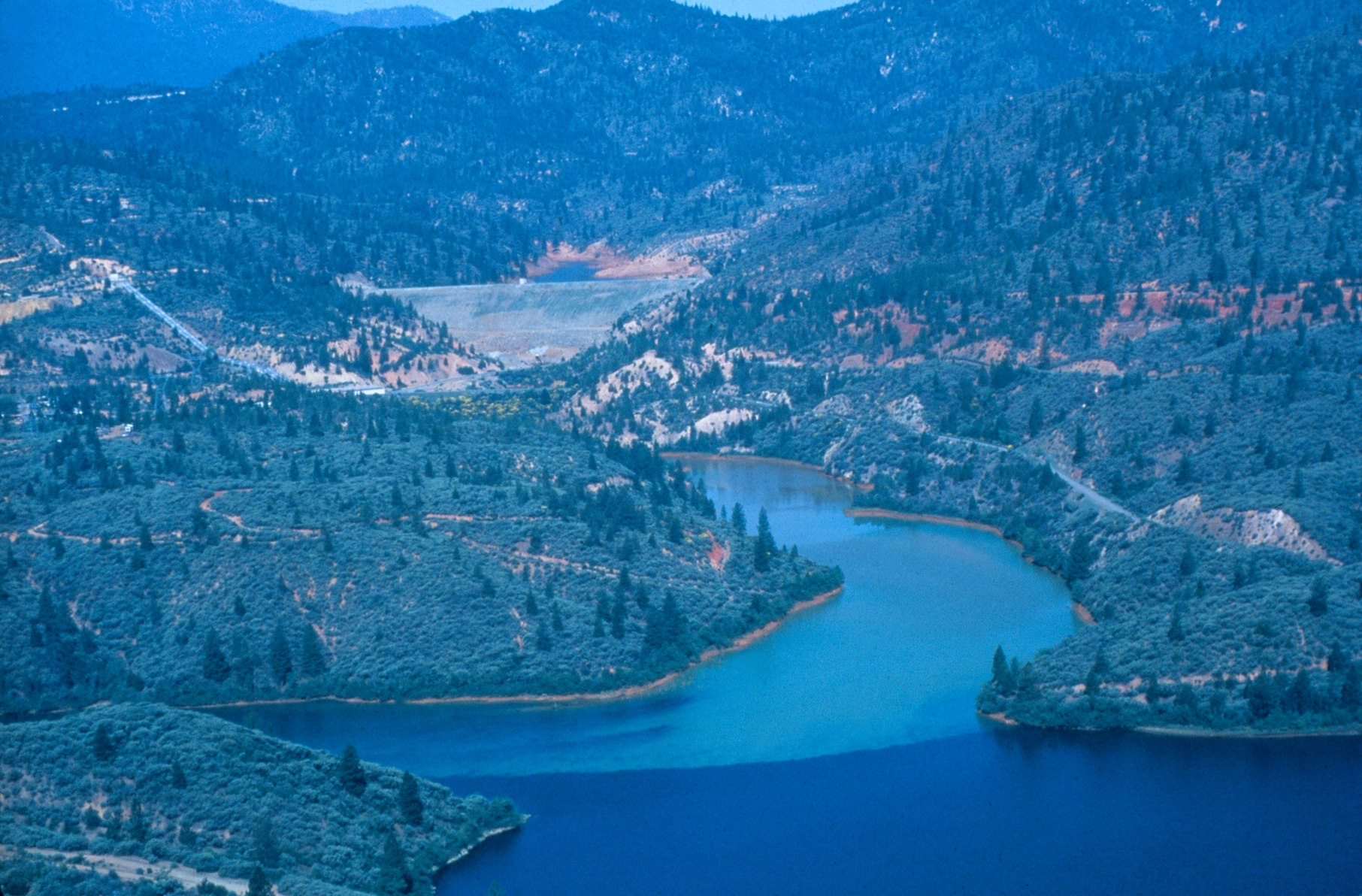
Looking west towards the town of Keswick with Spring Creek Dam in the background. The lighter color of the water coming from the dam is caused by acid.

The Spring Creek Dam is 196 feet (60 m) high, 1,110 feet (340 m) long along its crest, and 1,040 feet (320 m) thick at its base. Its crest stands 816 feet (249 m) above sea level. The reservoir is 795 feet (242 m) above sea level at full pool and spillway crest level. When at full pool, the reservoir holds 5,870 acre-feet (7,240 dam^{3}) of water with a depth of roughly 184 feet (56 m). One spillway runs over the crest of the dam on the left bank of the canyon. The spillway is 25 feet (7.6 m) wide, able to accommodate a water flow of 5,260 cubic feet (149 m^{3}) per second. The outlet works of the dam are located at the base, and can accommodate a water flow of 660 cubic feet (19 m^{3}) per second. The Spring Creek Powerplant downstream of the dam generates up to 180,000 kilowatts.

=== Spring Creek Powerplant ===
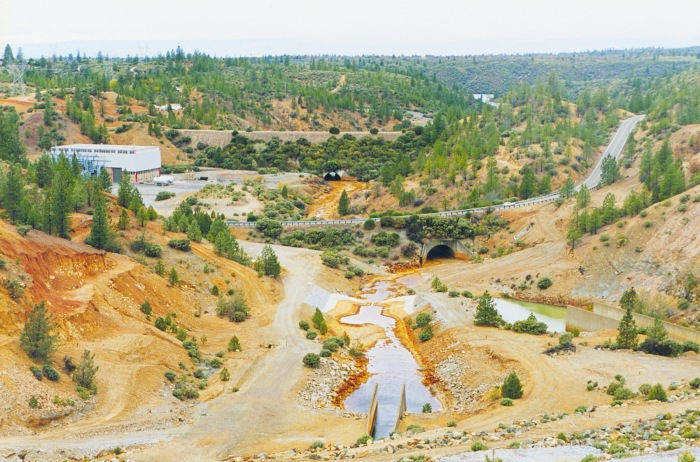
Looking downstream from the Spring Creek Dam. The Spring Creek Powerplant is the white structure in the left of the picture. As easily seen, Spring Creek flows through several large arch culverts below the dam.

The Spring Creek Powerplant is located at the base of the Spring Creek Dam, and is actually supplied by flow from Whiskeytown Lake. The lake, formed by Whiskeytown Dam, is on Clear Creek, a drainage downstream along the Sacramento River from Spring Creek. Both streams run east into the river. The power plant was completed and began operations in 1964, with a capacity of 150,000 kW. The capacity was later upgraded to 180,000 kW. The plant is a peaking power plant with two separate generators, generating power for operations and distributing excess power to the local power grid. Water from Whiskeytown Lake is diverted through the Spring Creek Tunnel, a conduit roughly 2.4 miles (3.9 km) long and 18.5 feet (5.6 m) in diameter.

The Bureau of Reclamation gives a detailed report on the specifications of the generating plant:

The powerplant houses two 13.8kV generators each rated at 100,000 kVA, .90 power factor, along with Francis turbines. Spring Creek Power Conduit conveys water from Whiskeytown Reservoir, located on Clear Creek, to the Spring Creek Powerplant. The Spring Creek power conduit varies in diameter between 5.64 metres (18.5 ft) and 5.18 metres (17.0 ft) and is about 4.8 km (3.0 mi) in length. The power conduit consists of Tunnels No. 1 and No. 2, and Rock Creek Siphon. Twin penstocks take off from Tunnel No. 2 leading to the powerplant.

– U.S. Bureau of Reclamation, Trinity River Division of the Central Valley Project

=== Spring Creek Reservoir ===
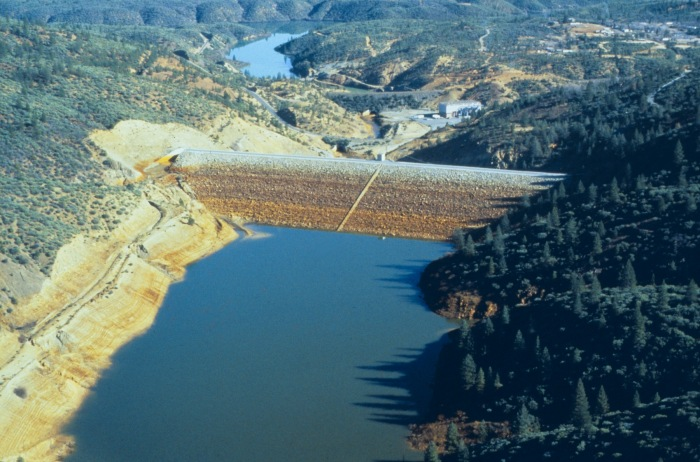
Spring Creek Reservoir, viewed downstream towards the dam, at moderate level on November 17, 1994

Spring Creek Reservoir is the artificial lake formed behind the dam. The reservoir is used mostly for flood control storage, and is rarely filled to its 5,870 acre-feet (7,240 dam^{3}) capacity. During the dry season, water from Spring Creek pools in a small, stagnant pond retained behind the dam, depositing contaminated sediment and acidic mine waste in the reservoir space. When flows from the Shasta Dam, upstream on the Sacramento River, are sufficient to flush contaminated water away, water held in the reservoir is released through the outlet works into the Keswick Reservoir and the Sacramento River. Despite this operation strategy, the reservoir was eventually deemed inadequate for the watershed, and can be filled to capacity by a single heavy storm event. Uncontrollable spills frequently poured into the Sacramento River during floods, through the crest spillway of the dam, which lacks gates. As a result, numerous fish kills have occurred during these sudden releases of contaminants, a major one of which was in 1969. Due to this consistent acid pollution from the reservoir, most large fish spawn downstream of Red Bluff Diversion Dam, a dam also on the Sacramento River near Red Bluff, California.

=== Spillway and outlet works ===
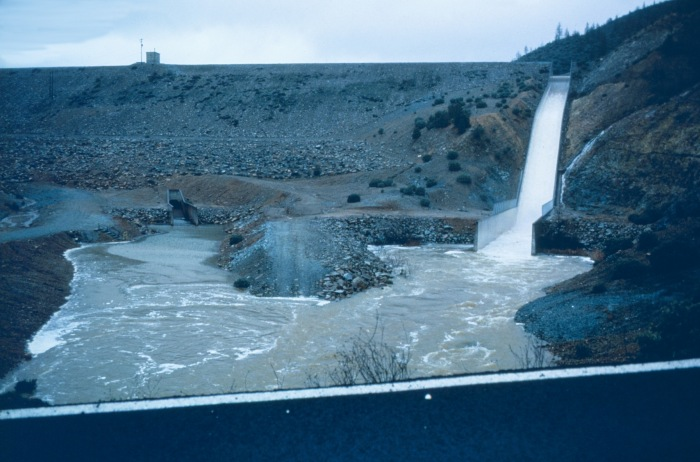
Spring Creek Dam releasing floodwaters in November 1994. The chute at right is the spillway and the outlet works is visible to the left.

The Spring Creek Dam is able to release up to 5,920 cubic feet (168 m^{3}) of water per second from the Spring Creek Reservoir, through a crest spillway and outlet works. The spillway begins on the left bank of the dam at elevation 795 feet (242 m), and drops roughly 184 feet (56 m) in vertical distance down the face of the dam into a stilling basin, before flowing into Spring Creek and into the Sacramento River. It is roughly 25 feet (7.6 m) wide and can carry 5,260 cubic feet (149 m^{3}) per second. The outlet works tunnel through the dam from an elevation much lower than that of the spillway; the conduit terminates at a culvert exit, a design commonly seen on storm drains but rarely seen on dams, at the base of the dam. The maximum capacity of the outlet works is 660 cubic feet (19 m^{3}) per second.

== See also ==
- List of dams and reservoirs in California
- List of United States Bureau of Reclamation dams
