= Spring Creek Reservoir (California) =

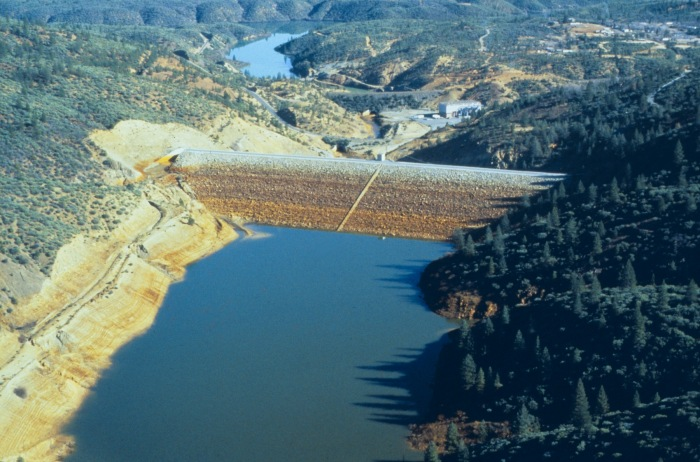

- Location within California Location within the United States
- Location: Shasta-Trinity National Forest; Shasta County, California
- Coordinates: 40°37′47″N 122°28′27″W
- Type: Reservoir
- Primary inflows: Spring Creek
- Primary outflows: Spring Creek
- Basin countries: United States
- Max. length: 1.5 km (0.93 mi)
- Max. width: 0.25 km (0.16 mi)
- Water volume: 5,870 acre⋅ft (7,240,000 m^{3})
- Shore length^{1}: 2 km (1.2 mi)
- Surface elevation: 245 m (804 ft)
- References: U.S. Geological Survey Geographic Names Information System: Spring Creek Reservoir (California)
- ^{1} Shore length is not a well-defined measure.

The Spring Creek Reservoir is the artificial lake created by the construction of the Spring Creek Dam across Spring Creek in the Shasta-Trinity National Forest of Shasta County, California, adjacent to Keswick.

The reservoir is used mostly for flood control storage, and is rarely filled to its 5,870 acre⋅ft (7,240,000 m^{3}) capacity. During the dry season, water from Spring Creek pools in a small pond retained behind the dam. Prior to the Iron Mountain Treatment Plant, the water in the reservoir was contaminated acidic mine waste in the reservoir space, and the water was acidic. When flows from the Shasta Dam, upstream on the Sacramento River, were sufficient to flush contaminated water away, water held in the reservoir was released through the outlet works into the Keswick Reservoir and the Sacramento River. Despite this operation strategy, the reservoir was eventually deemed inadequate for the watershed, and can be filled to capacity by a single heavy storm event. Uncontrollable spills frequently poured into the Sacramento River during floods, through the crest spillway of the dam, which lacks gates. As a result, numerous fish kills have occurred during these sudden releases of contaminants, a major one of which was in 1969. At this time, the water is neither contaminated with mine waste or acidic.

== See also ==
- List of dams and reservoirs in California
- List of lakes in California
