= Haifa Group =

Multi-national corporation specializing in plant nutrition

Haifa
- Formerly: Haifa Chemicals Ltd.
- Type: Private
- Industry: Fertilizer manufacturing
- Founded: 1967; 59 years ago in Haifa, Israel
- Founder: Israeli government
- Headquarters: Haifa, Israel
- Key people: Motti Levin (CEO)
- Number of employees: 5,000 (2025)
- Parent: Trance Resource Inc.
- Website: haifa-group.com

Haifa Group is a private international corporation which primarily manufactures Potassium Nitrate for agriculture and industry, specialty plant nutrients and food phosphates. Haifa also manufactures Controlled Release Fertilizers (CRF).

Haifa is supplying approximately 30% of the global demand for Potassium Nitrate fertilizers.

== History ==
Haifa Group was founded in Israel in 1967 (original name was Haifa Chemicals Ltd.). The company's name is a tribute to the city of Haifa, where Haifa Group was established and where the company's headquarters have been located since.

Haifa Group was founded as a government-owned company to develop the natural resources of Potash in the Dead Sea area and the Negev region.

Since 1989 Haifa Group is owned by Trance Resource Inc. (TRI), an American Holding Company controlled by The Trump Group.

Currently, Haifa Group includes 16 subsidiaries worldwide and production facilities in Israel, France, USA, and Canada. The annual turnover estimation is around $700 Million (2010).

== Product lines ==
- Plant nutrition – potassium nitrate products
- Water Soluble Fertilizers - NPK blends including calcium nitrate and magnesium nitrate for fertigation, soilless greenhouses, and the open field
- Controlled Release Fertilizers (CRF) - with longevity of 2 to 16 months
- Potassium Nitrate based granular NPK fertilizers
- Biostimulants
- Micronutrients
- Industrial chemicals
