= Keswick Dam =

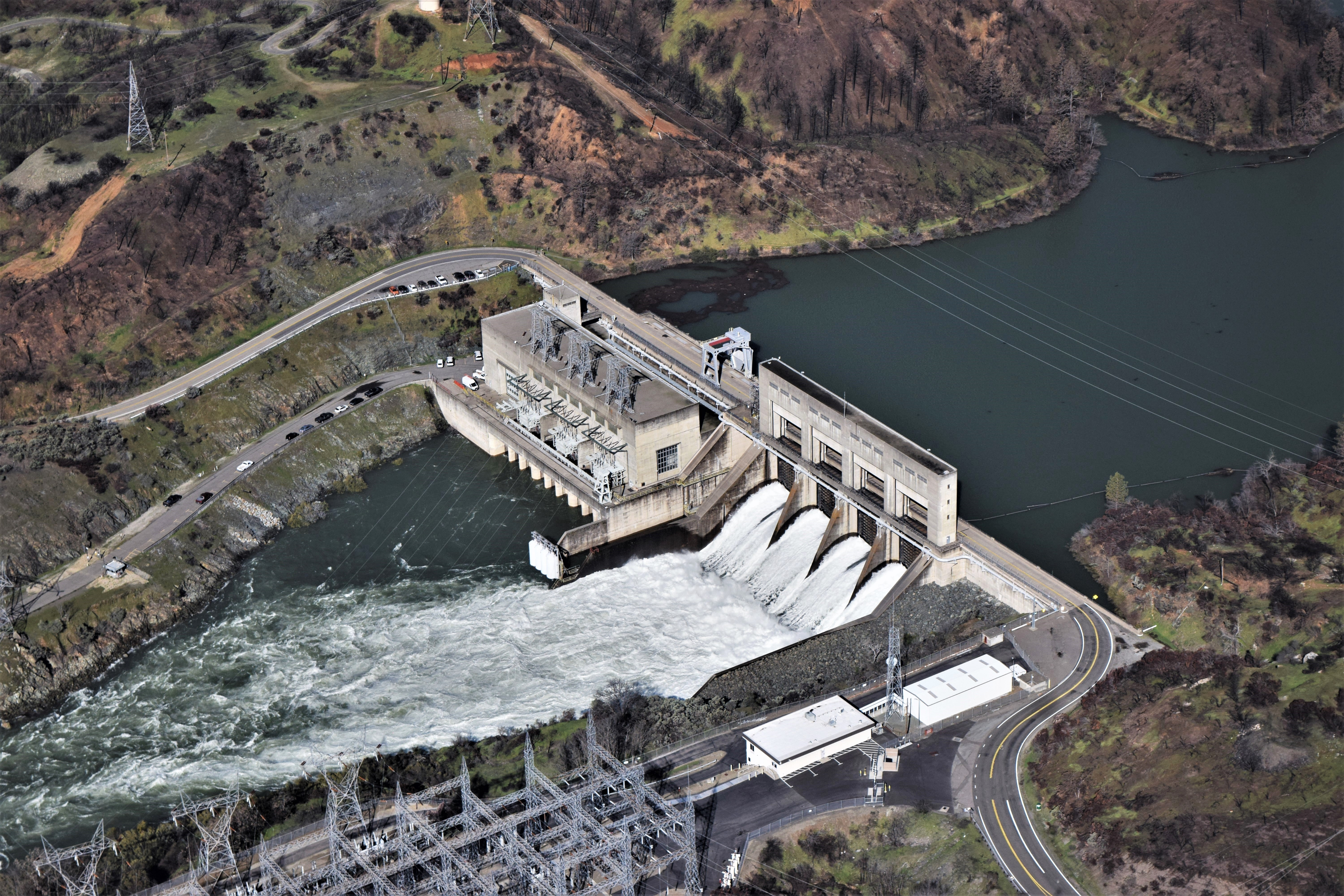
- Interactive map of Keswick Dam
- Country: United States
- Location: Shasta County, California
- Coordinates: 40°36′43″N 122°26′45″W
- Construction began: 1941; 85 years ago
- Opening date: 1950; 76 years ago
- Owner: U.S. Bureau of Reclamation

Dam and spillways
- Type of dam: Concrete gravity
- Impounds: Sacramento River
- Height: 157 ft (48 m)
- Length: 596 ft (182 m)
- Dam volume: 214,000 yd^{3} (164,000 m^{3})
- Spillways: Gated overflow
- Spillway capacity: 250,000 cu ft/s (7,100 m^{3}/s)

Reservoir
- Creates: Keswick Reservoir
- Total capacity: 23,800 acre⋅ft (29,400,000 m^{3})
- Catchment area: 6,380 mi^{2} (16,500 km^{2})
- Normal elevation: 601.6 ft (183.4 m)

Power Station
- Turbines: 3
- Installed capacity: 117 MW
- Annual generation: 416,585,000 KWh (2001–2012)

Keswick Dam is a concrete gravity dam on the Sacramento River about 2 miles (3.2 km) northwest of Redding, California. Part of the U.S. Bureau of Reclamation's Central Valley Project, the dam is 157 feet (48 m) high and impounds the Keswick Reservoir, which has a capacity of 23,800 acre⋅ft (29,400,000 m^{3}). The dam's power plant has three turbines with a generating capacity of 117 megawatts (MW), which, in 1992, was uprated from its original 75 MW. The dam and reservoir serve as an afterbay to regulate peaking power releases from the Shasta Dam upstream.

The electrical substation at Keswick Dam distributes power from the Keswick power plant, the power plants at Trinity Dam and Lewiston Dam, the Judge Francis Carr Power plant near Whiskeytown Lake, and the Spring Creek Power plant, which is located just northwest of Keswick Dam.

== History ==
=== Water scarcity ===
Water scarcity was felt starting in the 19th century, in the gold-mining era. The discovery of gold mines in the 1840s attracted a flood of immigrants to California. After a few years, many immigrants moved into agriculture, as it appeared to provide more stability than gold mining. The Central Valley had fertile soils, abundant water, and a flat gentle topography suitable for farming. An increase in demand for food eventually caused a shift from small-scale farming to large-scale intensive farming.

The low topography of the land caused flooding in the winter rainy season, but severe drought followed in summer months. Low water flow caused an increase in salinity, which resulted in the intrusion of salt in some parts of the valley, and in San Francisco Bay. The Keswick project was primarily intended for irrigation purposes, but it became a multipurpose project for flood control, improvement in navigation of the Sacramento River, the supply of water to domestic and industrial users, the generation of electric power, the conservation of fish and wildlife, the creation of opportunities for recreation, and the enhancement of water quality.

The California legislature enacted laws to deal with the state's water scarcity, and adopted a law establishing riparian water rights. This law had limitations: the owners of land bordering water had a right to a reasonable amount of that water, but owners whose land did not border bodies of water had no rights to any of the water. Due to the usage restrictions arising from the riparian rights law, the government directed state engineers to come up with a plan for the entire state that would accomplish a fair distribution of water for irrigation and domestic use.

=== Central Valley Project ===
Keswick Dam was built as part of the Central Valley Project (CVP), which was established to address unequal water allocation that left some landowners with no water supply, especially during the summer season, when water diversions for irrigation and domestic use were required in prolonged hot and dry weather.

The Central Valley Project is a major water-conservation development extending from the Cascade mountain range in the north to the semi-arid but fertile plains along the Kern River in the south. The state legislature created the CVP in 1933, but construction did not begin until the federal government assumed control of the project. The CVP's initial features were authorized for construction by the U.S. Army Corps of Engineers. The funds for the construction of the first features of the CVP were provided by the Emergency Relief Appropriation Act of 1935. Later, the U.S. Bureau of Reclamation took over operation of the CVP, and the project became subject to reclamation law, under a 1937 act, with three objectives: to regulate rivers and improve flood control and navigation, to provide water for irrigation and domestic use, and to generate power. As time progressed and additional canals, power plants, and dams were built, the CVP's role in the region's water structure became more complex.

Keswick Dam is part of the CVP's Shasta Division, which also includes Shasta Dam. Keswick Reservoir acts as Shasta Dam’s afterbay, stabilizing the erratic water flow released through the Shasta power plant, and it also captures water diverted from the Trinity River through the Trinity River division.

== Construction ==
Keswick Dam was named after Lord Keswick, the president of the Mountain Copper Company Limited. The project contract, with the Guy F. Atkinson and Kiefer Construction companies, was entered into by the U.S. Bureau of Reclamation; and construction started in August 1941. There was a labor shortage due to problems in the Central Valley, but the Bureau of Reclamation gave it the go-ahead.

By the end of 1941, despite labor issues, the Guy F. Atkinson Company completed the foundations. During construction, weather was another issue. In the hot summer months, the workers had to spray water to cool the aggregates. In the winter, workers heated the mixtures to keep their temperatures above 50 degrees. During rainy seasons, the construction was stopped due to flooding.

In 1944, for about a month near the end of World War II, there was a strike by workers, due to the Guy F. Atkinson Company's not honoring an earlier agreement to raise workers’ wages. Workers returned after a promise by the War Labor Board to consider the wage issue; and at the end of 1944, the agency increased wages.

In December 1947, lack of funds altered the planned building of the dam; however, the powerhouse structure was completed. By July 1948, Atkinson-Kier had completed the Keswick spillway and repaired eroded portions of the spillway apron. In 1949, Wismer and Becker installed two of the generators at the Keswick powerplant. Reclamation placed generator units Two and Three into operation. Early in 1950, the firm placed the fifty-by-fifty-foot spillway gates at Keswick, and the gates started operation on February 20. On March 31, 1950, Wismer and Becker installed the final generating unit at Keswick power plant.

== Geography ==
The landscape around Keswick Dam includes topographic features of the Klamath Mountains, the southern Cascade Range, and the Central Valley, including slopes characterized by a mix of pine and oak forests and chaparral and rock outcrops. The land on which the nearby city of Redding, California, was built is primarily made up of volcanic and sedimentary rocks that are metamorphosed. Two volcanic features – Mount Shasta and Lassen Peak – can be seen from numerous vantage points throughout the area.

Keswick Reservoir is prone to rapid rises and falls, while alternately receiving releases from Shasta Dam and providing water to Keswick Dam's power generators and to meet downstream water demands.

== Hydro-meteorological aspects ==
=== Climate ===
The climate in Shasta County can be characterized as hot and dry in the summer, and cool and wet in winter, with the best climate occurring during the spring and fall seasons, by virtue of average annual rainfall and temperatures.

The area receives average annual precipitation of about 69 inches, with the period of heaviest precipitation occurring from October through March, while June through September sees very low rainfall and reduced inflow of water to the dam's reservoir. In summer, temperatures range from about 85 to 90 °F (29 to 32 °C). In winter, temperatures average 40 °F (4 °C).

In summer, there is a significant increase in discharge from the dam due to greater demands for water, especially for agricultural use. High temperatures increase the rate of evaporation, so more water is needed to sustain crops.

=== Hydrology ===
Keswick and Shasta dams together regulate the flow of the Sacramento River below mile 302. In summer, outflow from Shasta Dam increases Keswick's inflow significantly, despite the prolonged dry months. Water from Whiskeytown Dam and Clear Creek Reservoir is released to the Sacramento River by way of Keswick Reservoir, to meet demand for water in Southern California. Under normal projected flood conditions, the width of the floodplain below Keswick Dam ranges from 200 to 500 feet. The river bed consists of coarse gravel at the riffle locations and fine sediments at non-riffle locations.

=== Water quality ===
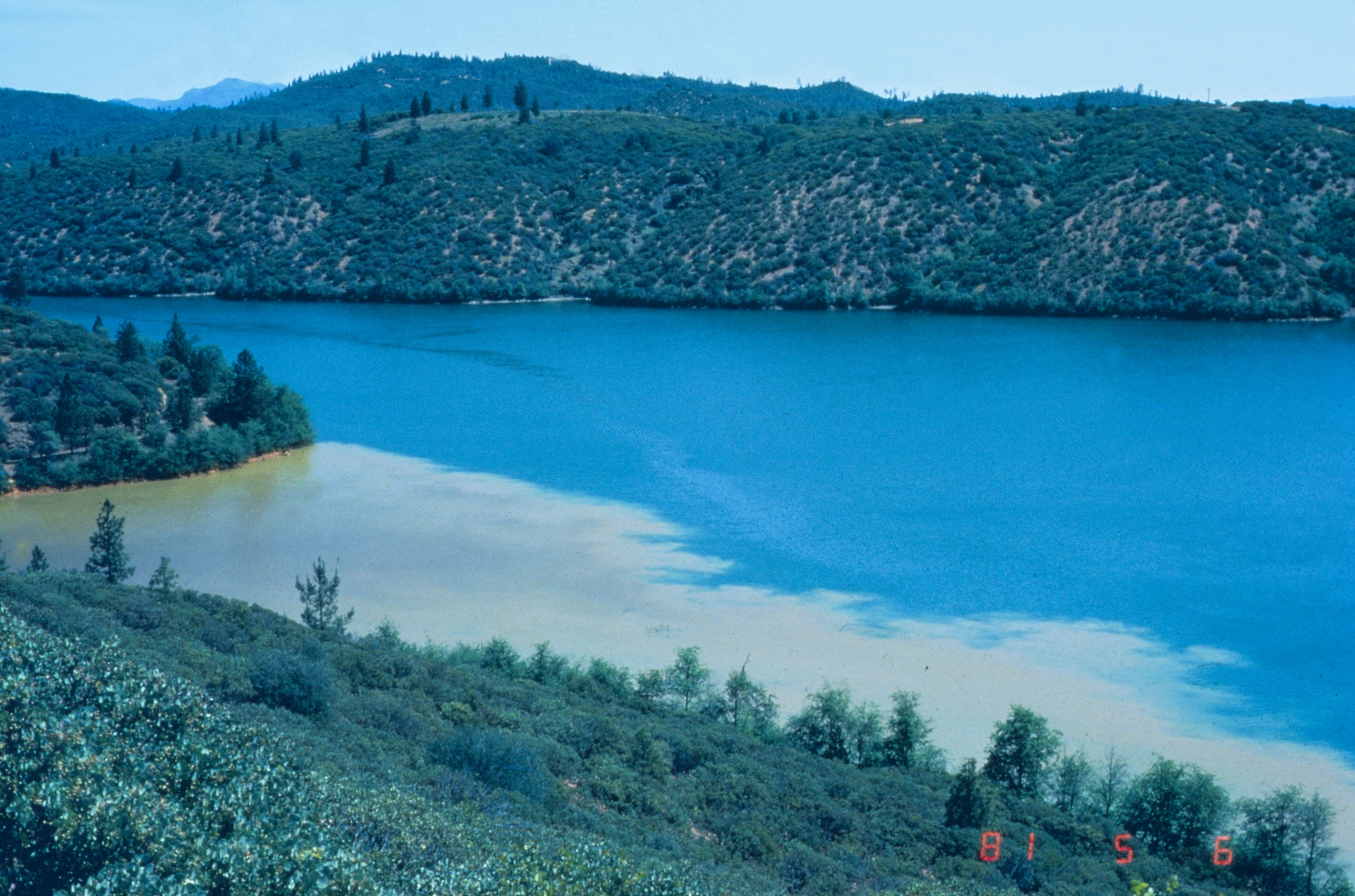
Acidic sludge in Keswick Reservoir, forebay of the Shasta Dam near Redding

Iron Mountain Mine was a widely known sulfide-ore mine that provided valuable metals; but its reputation suffered due to extreme acid mine drainage and deposition of contaminated sediments into the Sacramento River. The mine was located in Shasta County, adjacent to Keswick Reservoir, and is known to be the largest toxic metal contributor to the Sacramento River system. The contaminated metal sediments that precipitated from the mine drainage accumulated in the Spring Creek Reservoir and Keswick Reservoir. Copper was identified as the main pollutant of the river, but other contaminants that caused degradation of water quality include iron, zinc, cadmium, mercury, lead, and acidic water.

Other inactive mines have contributed to the degradation of water quality at Keswick Dam. Although laws such as the Clean Water Act and agencies such as the Environmental Protection Agency are dedicated to improving the quality of drinking water by treating the contaminants, uncontrolled acid mine drainage still poses a great threat to the quality of water in the area. The quality of surface water downstream from Keswick Dam is also influenced by other human activities along the Sacramento River, including agriculture, historical mining, and municipal and industrial inputs.

The total concentration of metals in the river has been recorded as high as 200 grams/liter (g/L) and the water so acidic as to register a pH as low as 3.6. In 2000, the water quality of the Sacramento River was reported to be relatively good. Other unknown traces of mercury, pesticides, and metals have also been recorded in the 26-mile reach from Keswick Dam to Red Bluff. Water temperature is another principal water quality issue in the upper Sacramento River between Keswick Dam and Red Bluff Diversion Dam (RBDD).

== Biological aspects ==
=== Wildlife and fisheries ===
Keswick Reservoir is an aquatic environment associated with the Sacramento River watershed. Cold-water fish species found in the reservoir include rainbow and brown trout. Warm-water species include the same species as found at Shasta Dam. The California Department of Fish and Wildlife occasionally plants hatchery-reared fish. The reservoir is accessible from the shore and by boat, but it is not heavily used for fishing. Keswick Dam is the uppermost barrier to anadromous fish migrating up the Sacramento River.

Because of its small size, Keswick Reservoir does not stratify. Reservoir levels fluctuate daily by one to three feet. The reservoir can fluctuate as much as eight to nine feet on an annual basis. Releases to the Sacramento River have ranged from approximately 3,300 cfs (Department Of Water Resources, 2011) during drought periods to 79,000 cfs during flood events ( Department of Water Resources, 1974).

From Keswick Dam south to Red Bluff, California, the Sacramento River is relatively narrow and deep with some areas of broader alluvial floodplain. Most of the Chinook-salmon-spawning habitat in the river is located in this reach. The variability and magnitude of natural seasonal flows of the Sacramento River have been significantly altered for the purposes of irrigation and flood control. The dams and diversions operated by the Central Valley Project and local irrigation districts control much of the flow in the Sacramento River. Since 1993, to protect the holding and spawning of winter-run Chinook salmon, Reclamation has been required to manage cold-water reservoir storage and releases to maintain daily average water temperatures at or below 56 °F (13 °C) between Keswick Dam and compliance locations between Balls Ferry and Bend Bridge, from May 15 to September 30.

=== Ecological effects ===
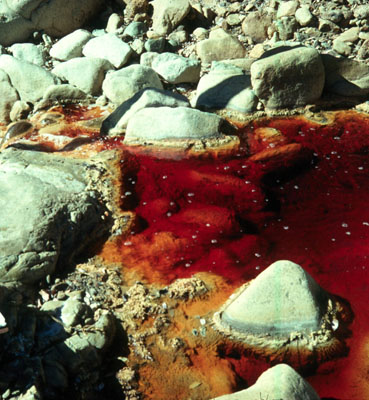
Iron Mountain Acid Mine drainage. The mine was in operation from the 1860s until 1963.

Both Iron Mountain Mine and pyritic ore mining in Shasta County have contributed to the degradation of the Sacramento River, in addition to killing fish and other aquatic organisms downstream of Sacramento River to Keswick Dam. This is as a result of the acidity of the water caused by metal deposits and other metal deposits contaminating the sediments in the river. Exposure to copper and other metals physiologically affects salmonid species, especially with regard to reproduction, in the Sacramento River below Keswick Dam. Winter-run Chinook salmon spawning in the river is one of the major salmonid species that are threatened.

Spring Creek Reservoir was built to control the drainage prior to discharge into Keswick Reservoir. The acid level, which was previously recorded in a pH range between 1.5 and -3.6, improved to a pH of about 3. When the acid mine-drainage and the discharge deposits were diverted to a treatment plant, that improved the concentrations of metals by about 97%, under regular operating conditions. Currently, the water-quality characteristics at the Spring Creek Debris Dam outlet to Keswick Reservoir meet the water standards for the Sacramento River as set and regulated by the Water Control Board.

== See also ==
- List of dams and reservoirs in California
- List of power stations in California
