= Central Valley Project =

Flood control, energy production, and water conveyance infrastructure in California

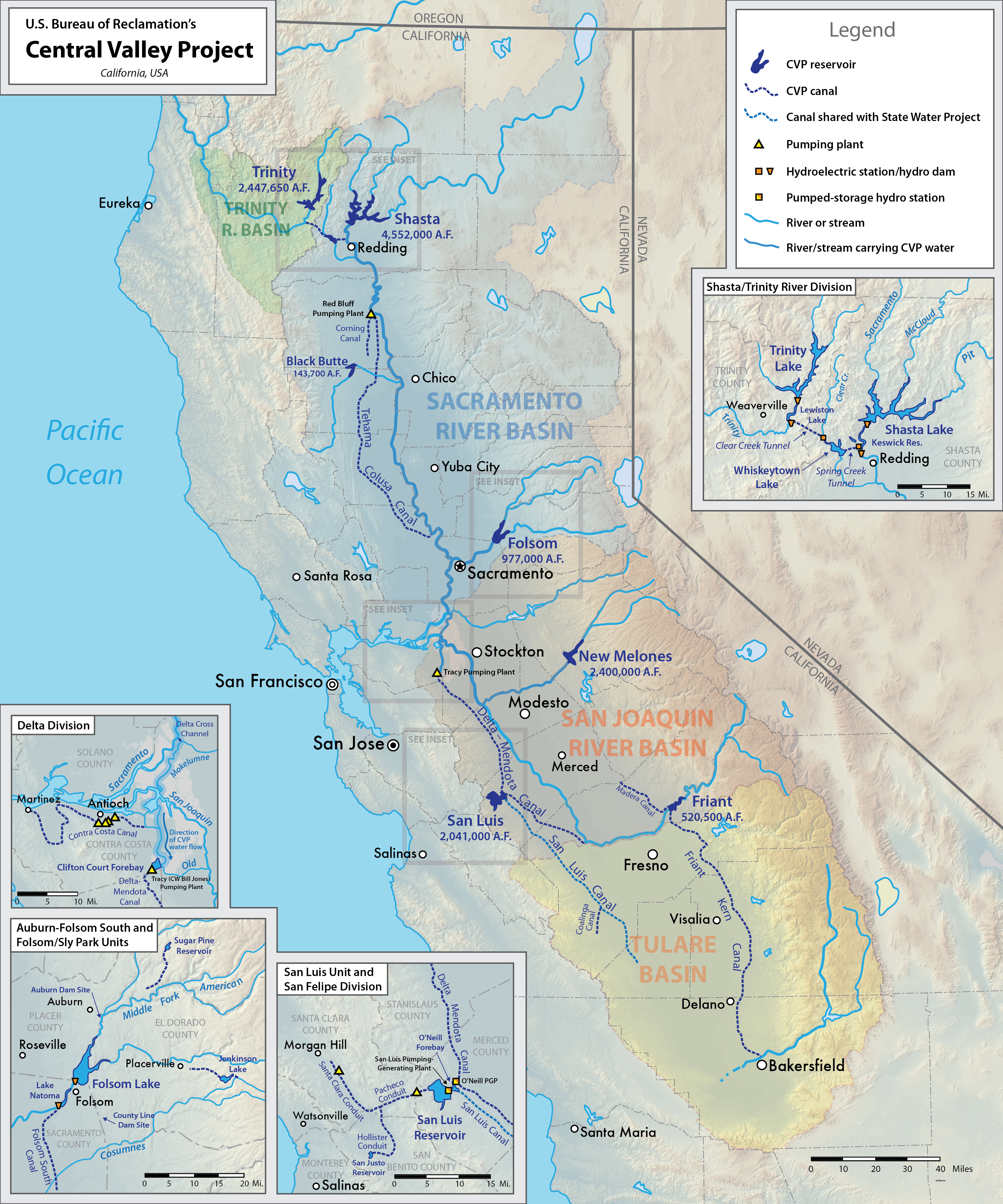
- Map showing CVP facilities in the state of California.

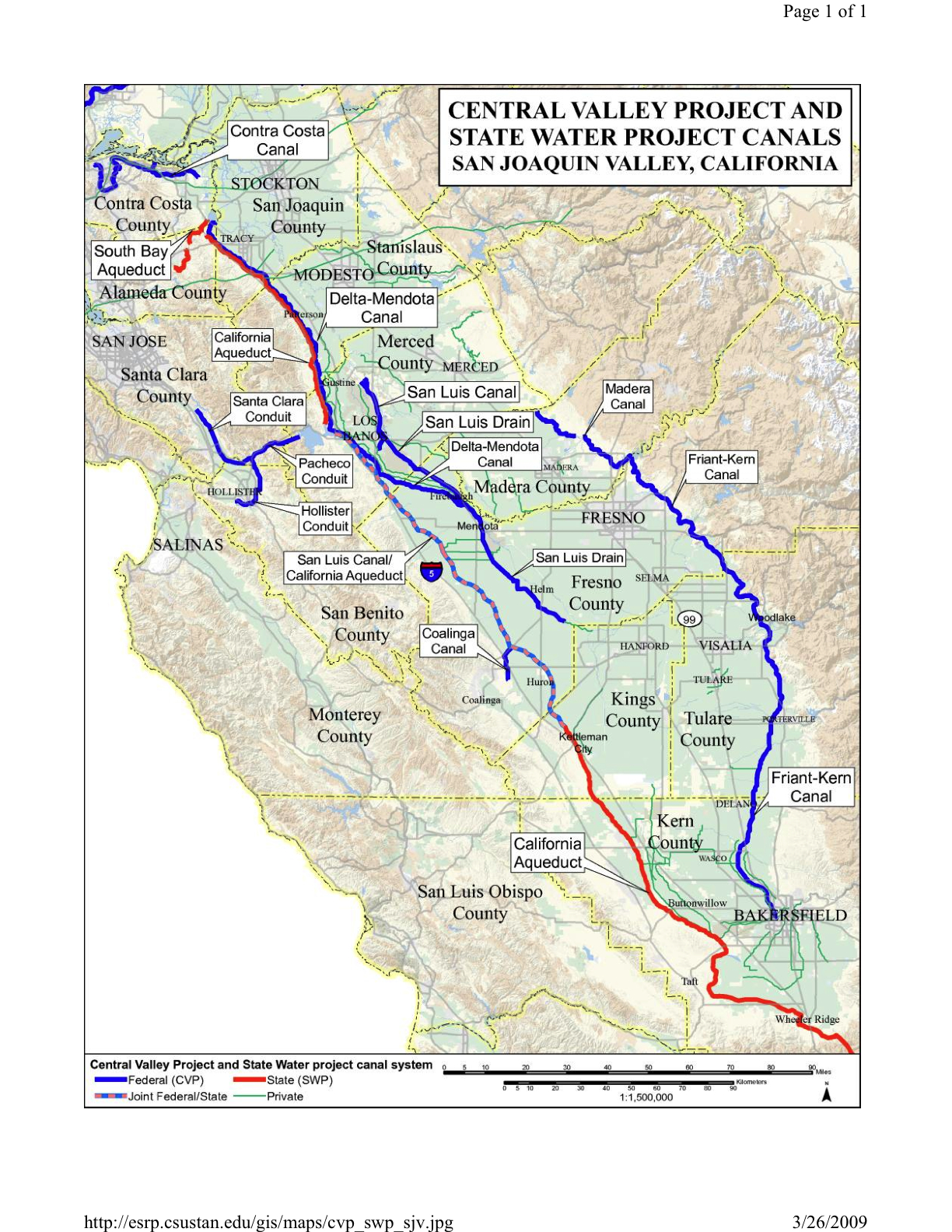
- Map of CVP canal system in the San Joaquin Valley. CVP aqueducts are in blue while SWP aqueducts are in red.

General statistics
- Begun: 1933
- Storage dams: Auburn (canceled); Contra Loma; Folsom; Friant; Funks; New Melones; San Justo; San Luis; Shasta; Sly Park; Trinity; Whiskeytown
- Additional dams: Camp Creek Diversion; County Line (unbuilt); Keswick; Lewiston; Little Panoche; Los Baños; Nimbus; Red Bluff; O'Neill; Spring Creek; Sugar Pine
- Power plants: Friant (25 MW); Folsom minha (199 MW); Judge Francis Carr (154 MW); Keswick (117 MW); New Melones (300 MW); Nimbus (7.7 MW); Shasta (676 MW); Spring Creek (180 MW); Trinity (140 MW); William R. Gianelli (424 MW)
- Canals: 643.6 mi (1,035.8 km)

Operations
- Storage capacity: 13,410,683 acre-feet (16,541,834 dam^{3})
- Annual water yield: 7,000,000 acre-feet (8,600,000 dam^{3})
- Land irrigated: 3,000,000 acres (1,200,000 ha)
- Total generation capacity: 2,254 MW
- Total annual generation: 5.18 TWh (2004)

The Central Valley Project (CVP) is a federal power and water management project in the U.S. state of California under the supervision of the United States Bureau of Reclamation (USBR). It was devised in 1933 in order to provide irrigation and municipal water to much of California's Central Valley—by regulating and storing water in reservoirs in the northern half of the state (once considered water-rich but suffering water-scarce conditions more than half the year in most years), and transporting it to the water-poor San Joaquin Valley and its surroundings by means of a series of canals, aqueducts and pump plants, some of which are shared with the California State Water Project (SWP). Many CVP water users are represented by the Central Valley Project Water Association.

In addition to water storage and regulation, the system has a hydroelectric capacity of over 2,000 megawatts, and provides recreation and flood control with its twenty dams and reservoirs. It has allowed major cities to grow along Valley rivers which previously would flood each spring, and transformed the semi-arid desert environment of the San Joaquin Valley into productive farmland. Freshwater stored in Sacramento River reservoirs and released downriver during dry periods prevents salt water from intruding into the Sacramento-San Joaquin Delta during high tide. There are eight divisions of the project and ten corresponding units, many of which operate in conjunction, while others are independent of the rest of the network. California agriculture and related industries now directly account for 7% of the gross state product for which the CVP supplied water for about half.

Many CVP operations have had considerable environmental consequences, including a decline in the salmon population of four major California rivers in the northern state, and the reduction of riparian zones and wetlands. Many historical sites and Native American tribal lands have been flooded by CVP reservoirs. In addition, runoff from intensive irrigation has polluted rivers and groundwater. The Central Valley Project Improvement Act, passed in 1992, intends to alleviate some of the problems associated with the CVP with programs like the Refuge Water Supply Program.

In recent years, a combination of drought and regulatory decisions passed based on the Endangered Species Act of 1973 have forced Reclamation to turn off much of the water for the west side of the San Joaquin Valley in order to protect the fragile ecosystem in the Sacramento-San Joaquin Delta and keep alive the dwindling fish populations of Northern and Central California rivers. In 2017 the Klamath and Trinity rivers witnessed the worst fall run Chinook salmon return in recorded history, leading to a disaster declaration in California and Oregon due to the loss of the commercial fisheries. The recreational fall Chinook salmon fishery in both the ocean and the Trinity and Klamath rivers was also closed in 2017. Only 1,123 adult winter Chinook salmon returned to the Sacramento Valley in 2017, according to a report sent to the Pacific Fishery Management Council (PFMC) by the California Department of Fish and Wildlife (CDFW). This is the second lowest number of returning adult winter run salmon since modern counting techniques were implemented in 2003. By comparison, over 117,000 winter Chinooks returned to spawn in 1969.

== Overview ==
=== Operations ===
The CVP stores about 13 million acre-feet (16 km^{3}) of water in 20 reservoirs in the foothills of the Sierra Nevada, the Klamath Mountains and the California Coast Ranges, and passes about 7.4 million acre-feet (9.1 km^{3}) of water annually through its canals. Of the water transported, about 5 million acre-feet (6.2 km^{3}) goes to irrigate 3,000,000 acres (1,200,000 ha) of farmland, 600,000 acre-feet (0.74 km^{3}) supplies municipal uses, and 800,000 acre-feet (0.99 km^{3}) is released into rivers and wetlands in order to comply with state and federal ecological standards.

Two large reservoirs, Shasta Lake and Trinity Lake, are formed by a pair of dams in the mountains north of the Sacramento Valley. Water from Shasta Lake flows into the Sacramento River which flows to the Sacramento-San Joaquin Delta and water from Trinity Lake flows into the Trinity River which leads to the Pacific Ocean. Both lakes release water at controlled rates. There, before it can flow on to San Francisco Bay and the Pacific Ocean, some of the water is intercepted by a diversion channel and transported to the Delta-Mendota Canal, which conveys water southwards through the San Joaquin Valley, supplying water to San Luis Reservoir (a SWP-shared facility) and the San Joaquin River at Mendota Pool in the process, eventually reaching canals that irrigates farms in the valley. Friant Dam crosses the San Joaquin River upstream of Mendota Pool, diverting its water southwards into canals that travel into the Tulare Lake area of the San Joaquin Valley, as far south as the Kern River. Finally, New Melones Lake, a separate facility, stores water flow of a San Joaquin River tributary for use during dry periods. Other smaller, independent facilities exist to provide water to local irrigation districts.

=== Background ===
The Central Valley Project was the world's largest water and power project when undertaken during Franklin D. Roosevelt's New Deal public works agenda. The Project was the culmination of eighty years of political fighting over the state's most important natural resource - water. The Central Valley of California lies to the west of the Sierra Nevada Mountains with its annual runoff draining into the Pacific Ocean through the Sacramento–San Joaquin River Delta. It is a large receding geological floodplain moderated by its Mediterranean climate of dry summers and wet winters that includes regular major drought cycles. At the time of its construction, the project was at the center of a political and cultural battle over the state's future. It intersected with the state's ongoing war over land use, access to water rights, impacts on indigenous communities, large vs. small farmers, the state's irrigation districts, and public vs. private power. Its proponents ignored environmental concerns over its impacts, other than the outcome not damaging the major stakeholders at that time.

The Central Valley of California has gone through two distinct culturally driven land use eras. The first was the indigenous tribal period that lasted for thousands of years. Then came the arrival of Europeans, first by the Spanish colonial model of Catholic missions and ranchos (1772–1846), which was then followed by the current United States era. Due to its Mediterranean climate, the first cultural period was hunter-gatherer based. The Spanish missions' ranching and tanning business was based on the forced labor of Las Californias tribes. Spain's model of land use with the grazing of livestock for meat, wool and leather started along Alta California's coast, eventually spreading inland. The U.S. era evolved from primarily ranching to large-scale plantations or more commonly known today as corporate farming that turned the Central Valley into the breadbasket of the U.S.

Following the 1848 California Gold Rush, large numbers of U.S. citizens came into the region and made attempts to practice rainfed agriculture, but most of the Central Valley land was taken up by large cattle ranchers like Henry Miller who eventually controlled 22,000 square miles of land. The large-scale levee construction by Chinese workers along the Delta was where limited irrigation for orchards first started.

Following the arrival of the Transcontinental railroad, immigration from Asia and the rest of the U.S. led to growing numbers of settlers in the region. Despite the rich soils and favorable weather of the 42,000-square-mile (110,000 km^{2}) Central Valley, immigrants to the valley who were unfamiliar with its seasonal patterns of rainfall and flooding began to take up irrigation practices. Farmers soon found themselves troubled by frequent floods in the Sacramento Valley and a general lack of water in the San Joaquin Valley. The Sacramento River, which drains the northern part, receives between 60 and 75% of the precipitation in the Valley, despite the Sacramento Valley covering less area than the much larger San Joaquin Valley, drained by the San Joaquin River, which receives only about 25% of the rainfall. Furthermore, cities drawing water from the Sacramento-San Joaquin Delta faced problems in dry summer and autumn months when the inflowing water was low. In order to continue to sustain the valley's economy, there needed to be systems to regulate flows in the rivers and equally distribute water among the north and south parts of the valley.

=== History ===
In 1873, Barton S. Alexander completed a report for the U.S. Army Corps of Engineers that was the first attempt at creating a Central Valley Project. In 1904, the Bureau of Reclamation (then the Reclamation Service) first became interested in creating such a water project, but did not get far involved until a series of droughts and related disasters occurred in the early 1920s. The State of California passed the Central Valley Project Act in 1933, which authorized Reclamation to sell revenue bonds in order to raise about $170 million for the project. Unfortunately, because of insufficient money in the state's treasury and the coincidence with the Great Depression, California turned to the national government for funding to build the project. This resulted in several transfers of the project between California and the federal government, and between Reclamation and the Army Corps of Engineers. The first dams and canals of the project started going up in the late 1930s, and the last facilities were completed in the early 1970s. Other features of the project were never constructed, some lie partly finished, or are still awaiting authorization.

=== Timeline ===
==== Prior to 1920 ====
- pre-western arrival – Tribal culture - seasonal migratory locations between the Tulares and Sierra foothills
- 1493 – The Papal Bull known as the Discovery Doctrine, in Latin titled the "Inter Caetera", gave Spain the right to take land and convert the indigenous occupants to Christianity in areas west of the Inter Caetera's line of demarcation, which divided the Western Hemisphere
- 1769–76 – The arrival of Spain and its Spanish missions in California - Indians promised sovereign control
- 1822 - Republic of Mexico formed - breaks with Spain's sovereign promise to California Mission Indians
- 1823 - The Papal Bulls that made up the Discovery doctrine from 1455 and 1493 becomes part of U.S. Law
- 1833 - Secularization Act closes California Missions and sells off church properties
- The act initiated the transfer of 64 million acres of tribal lands via land grants or Ranchos to former Spanish citizens of Californio
- 1846 Bear Flag Rebellion - as part of the Mexican–American War and U.S. invasion of California - Republic of California
- 1846 - John Fremont kills original owner of the largest North American mercury mine at New Almaden after failing to buy it
- 1846 - Yerba Buena land grant takes its name from local Catholic mission and becomes San Francisco
- 1848 - Treaty of Guadalupe Hidalgo promises Mexican-Americans ownership of their Ranchos (ranches) and water rights
- 1849 - Influx of 80,000 immigrants during Gold Rush includes riots and land theft by squatter movement
- Sept-Oct - Californians meets in Monterrey for the first California Constitutional Convention
- 1850 - California admitted to Union
- 1850s - Hydraulic mining in gold region contaminates Sacramento Delta with silt and mercury
- 1850 - California Indian Protection Act removes Indian's civil rights and enslaves them, starting the mass genocide of many of the state's 300 tribes
- 1850 - California adopts British Common Law causing 70 years of disputes over water rights
- 1850 - Squatters cut down the world's largest Blossom Rock Redwoods and clearcut the groves on Peralta and Moraga's ranchos in Oakland hills
- 1851-90 California Lands Commission - Mexican-American Ranchos lost to whites
- 1851 - Catholic Church attempts to get land for Mission tribes from California Lands Commission but fails
- 1851-1890 - Indians populations decimated
- 1851 - Tribes Rounded up by U.S. Army and forced to sign 18 treaties
- 1850 Swamp Act - Enables Henry Miller to eventually own over 1 million acres of land in the Central valley
- 1853 - Americans cut Mother of the Forest causing international uproar
- The history of Clearcutting in the Sierra Nevada Mountains resulted in expanded flooding and environmental degradation
- 1853 - First documented American irrigation ditch constructed in Visalia, Tulare County
- 1855 - Van Ness ordinance - State adopts illegal grab of San Francisco lands
- 1860 - San Francisco beats U.S. Government in Supreme Court over land claims
- 1861 - Chinese build Sacramento Delta levees
- 1862 - Sacramento and levees destroyed by flooding - levees rebuilt
- 1862 - Lincoln passes Transcontinental Railroad Act giving away 140 million acres to railroad barons
- 1862 - Homestead Act allows adults who never took up arms against the government the right to claim 160 acres
- May 14 - California legislation permits the formation of canal construction companies
- 1866 - San Francisco wins Supreme Court case and all illegal land takings
- 1866 - The University of California formed as Land-grant university with the right to take public lands
- 1866 - Mining Act included the right of miners to take public lands for ditches and dams
- 1869 - Transcontinental railroad completed - new immigration rush
- 1869 - First systematic Irrigation was in Anaheim and Riverside
- 1872 - Desert Land Act allows irrigation and lands in the west
- 1872 - California Irrigation Act passed by the state legislature allowing for cooperative water irrigation development.
- 1872 - US Mining Act
- 1873 - Congress sets up the Alexander Commission to design an irrigation system for the Central Valley.
- 1874 - Alexander Commission report sent to congress in March
- 1878 - Workingmen's Party takes control of state government on an anti-railroad campaign
- 1878 - William Hammond Hall obtains $100,000 to produce statewide irrigation plan - project collapses
- 1879 - New Constitution for state passed by workingmen bans Southern Pacific R.R. lobbying
- 1880 - Formation of California Railroad Commission known today as the California Public Utilities Commission
- 1884 - The use of Hydraulic mining in gold mining of the Sierra's damages Sacramento watershed and is forced to stop
- 1886 - Miller-Lux Cattle Ranch v. Tevis-Haggins water wars: Riparian v. Prior-appropriation water rights
- 1887 - State of California establishes the Modesto Irrigation District
- Mar 7 - California Wright Act okays the formation of irrigation districts. It was renamed as the California Irrigation District Act in 1917.
- 1890 - Canal Act reserved federal authority for right of way to canals on public lands
- 1898 - San Francisco passes Charter that calls for public ownership of transit, telephones, water and power
- 1899 - Elwood Mead is appointed by the U.S. Department of Agriculture to carry out irrigation surveys
- 1901 - Right to Construct Reservoirs by corporations on public lands
- 1902 - National Reclamation Act passed that created the United States Bureau of Reclamation (USBR)
- 1902 - Tulare Irrigation District v. Shepard irrigation district legal dispute
- 1905 - Owens valley water plan okayed by Los Angeles Water Commission
- 1905 - $40 million statewide irrigation plan fails due to lack of financing support
- 1905 - Salton Sea created by irrigation diversion of Colorado River
- 1907 - City of San Francisco votes to construct a water and power supply known as Hetch Hetchy that is located Yosemite
- 1911 - Constitutional Act - California Railroad Commission takes over regulatory role of cities for electric rates
- 1913 - Water Commission Act attempts to sort out the state's water rights
- 1913 - The Raker Act passes, permitting San Francisco to build a public water and power system at Hetch Hetchy
- 1915 - State Water Problems Conference set up holding hearings the following year - decision Riparian rights the problem
- 1915 - California Irrigation Act declared unconstitutional by state supreme court
- 1917 - California Hawson Bill provides relief to water appropriator claims from Riparian Rights lawsuits
- 1918-20 - State suffers severe drought
- 1919 - Chief Hydrographer of the USGS Robert Bradford Marshall sends report titled the "Irrigation of Twelve Million Acres in the Valley of California" to Governor William Stephens Marshall is considered the father of the Central Valley Project
- Jan 14 - The city of Oroville Ca. moves ahead with plan to purchase PG&E gas and power operations
- Feb 3 - U.S. presidential candidate Senator Hiram Johnson is in favor of public ownership of electric utilities
- Feb 18 - Glenn County Ca. considers formation of an Irrigation district to take advantage of planned Iron Mountain dam

==== 1920 ====
- 1920 Jan 4 - Sacramento Valley Irrigation Association calls for water congress at the Capital
- Jan 10 - The U.S. Corps of Engineers proposes 3 dams and a series of locks on the Sacramento River
- Jan 14 - Western States request $250 million for irrigation projects
- Jan 23 - The Yuba-Nevada-Sutter Water and Power Association established for 80,000 acre water and power project
- Jan 23 - Santa Barbara plan to add powerhouse as way to pay for the city's Gibraltar dam project
- Jan 24 - Eureka Chamber of Commerce opposes proposed dam across Eel River others opposed due to fishing impacts
- Jan 29 - PG&E which relies heavily on hydro-electricity prepares emergency power plans due to lack of rainfall
- Feb 8 - Interior Secretary Franklin Lane requests $12.8 million for annual western irrigation funding
- Feb 8 - The Sacramento Union asks public to "Pray for rain" on the front page of its newspaper
- Feb 11 - Nevada County farmers protest PG&E's attempt to divert their water supplies at California Railroad Commission
- Feb 24 - Miller & Lux legal fight against the Madera Irrigation District to take water from the San Joaquin River
- Feb 25 - Major Water and Power rationing announced due to Northern California drought
- Feb 26 - The Sacramento Valley water and irrigation congress asks governor to call a special legislative session on drought
- Mar 13 - Proposal to build three powerhouses and divert American River water for irrigation in Placer County
- Mar 25 - Ninety California power companies meet and agree to let state power administrator manage power during crisis
- April 21 - PG&E announces plans to spend $15 Million in next two years on new power development
- April 30 - Sacramento politicians call for takeover of PG&E's electric and transit system
- May - The National Electric Light Association releases its National Water power report
- May 1 - PG&E announces $10 million plan to construct hydro-electric dams on Pit River
- May 11 - The California Railroad Commission (CPUC) emergency plan opposed by the Association of Irrigation Districts of Northern California
- May 13 - PG&E acknowledged during hearings that it used ratepayer money for political campaigns
- May 17 - Yolo County announces plan to create 100,000 acre irrigation district
- May 18 - Proposal to construct dam across the Carquinez Strait to stop saltwater incursions
- May 27 - Impacts of Clearcutting Sierra Nevada's Forests and flooding Central Valley made public
- June 7 - Water wars between Northern California irrigation districts and Contra Costa and Delta farmers over salt water incursions
- June 10 - 1920 Federal Water Power Act Signed into law that allows for expediting nationwide development of hydro-electric projects on U.S. rivers
- June 20 - PG&E applies to state railroad commission for rule changes to protect itself during power and water shortage
- July 4 - U.S. War Department begins investigation of building 4 dams and mobile locks on Sacramento River
- July 10 - PG&E curtails afternoon water pumping in five irrigation districts
- July 13 - City of Antioch starts lawsuit against rice farmers that threatens Water supply
- July 24 - The Madera Irrigation District starts the Madera dam project on San Joaquin River which later becomes Friant Dam
- July 27 - California representative protests Nevada's plan to take Lake Tahoe water
- July 28 - 800,000 acres of Miller-Lux land and water rights to be subdivided and sold to small farmers
- July 31 - The Glenn-Colusa irrigation district announce plan for a 1 million acre reservoir in Shasta county
- Aug 5 - Irrigation companies organize their own plan for water development
- Aug 15 - Colonel Robert B Marshall of USGS Plan introduced at Sacramento Valley Development Assoc.
- Aug 24 - War Department's plan for four Dam dragged into lawsuit between Antioch and California rice farmers
- Sept 26 - Major support for state Marshall Plan announced
- Oct 7 - Carquinez Straights dam not feasible
- Oct 11 - Court case between Rice farmers and Antioch continues
- Oct 17 - Marshall Plan will ask state legislature for $500,000 survey
- Oct 30 - The California State Irrigation Association expands its operations and support for statewide Marshall water plan
- Nov 10 - California League of Municipalities to cooperate in legislation on public power and water
- Nov 11 - Valley Cities urged to develop public power
- Nov 20 - Klamath Chamber of Commerce opens hearings on public vs. private power and water development
- Nov 21 - Locals opposed to California-Oregon Power Company's Klamath River power monopoly
- Dec 21 - Giant Boulder Dam plan on Colorado River by Southern California Edison announced
- 1920 PUC report on SVWCo

==== 1921 ====
- 1921 - The Municipal Utility District Act (MUD Act) passed by the California Legislature
- Jan 5 - Marshall Plan proposes Shasta dam to be located at Kennett rather than Iron Mountain
- Jan 7 - State Senator M.B Johnson introduces California Water and Power senate bill
- Jan 7 – 13 years of bloodshed and litigation end with PG&E winning water rights
- Jan 11 - The California State Irrigation Association and Sacramento Union promotes Marshall Plan review
- Jan 21 - $500,000 for Marshall water plan study introduced at state legislature
- Jan 29 - League of California Municipalities develop plan for public power legislation
- Jan 29 - Sacramento City Attorney attacks California Railroad commission for bias towards PG&E
- Jan 30 - Marshall Plan endorsement by League of California Municipalities
- Feb 23 - Marshall Plan endorsed by Southern California municipalities
- Mar 10 - The California State Irrigation Association sends Col. Marshall's list of 346 reservoir candidates to the League of California Municipalities
- Mar 14 - Details of the Marshall Plan promoted by the California State Irrigation Association
- Mar 15 - Municipal Utility District law results in heavy debate
- Mar 20 - State, federal and global impacts on the passage of the 1920 Water and Power Act
- Apr 2 - San Francisco Commonwealth Club opposes Marshall Plan during legislative hearings in Sacramento
- Apr 2 - Attempt by electric company supporter to kill Johnson's Water and Power Bill fails in Senate
- Apr 21 - Growing concern in San Joaquin Valley over Southern California power companies taking hydro-electric sites
- Apr 22 - Marshall Plan for Sacramento River irrigation survey given $200,000 by legislature
- Apr 26 - Johnson Power & Water Bill 397 loses by 4 votes in assembly committee
- Apr 28 - Municipal Utility District Act passed by state senate
- Apr 30 - Sacramento Union editorial calls for statewide vote after electric company lobby kills Johnson Power Bill
- May 4 - Sacramento City Commission resolution calls for emergency meeting of League of California Municipalities (248 cities)over Johnson bill
- May 9 - Sacramento City Attorney says public ownership could reduce electric rates from 8 cents to .8 cent
- May 17 - Sacramento City Commission report on building its own hydro-electric site on Silver Creek
- May 20 - Plan set up for statewide public power initiative at emergency meeting of League of California Municipalities
- May 20 - California State Irrigation Association endorses Marshall plan and Municipal League's statewide vote
- May 24 - Governor signs Municipal Utility District Act into law
- June 4 - $200,000 survey fund for Marshall Plan signed by governor
- July 1 - Miller and Lux loses its lawsuit to stop the Madera Irrigation District from using water from the San Joaquin river
- July 22 - Summary of the proposed Water and Power Act is modeled like the Ontario Canada hydro-electric system
- July 27 - State Water & Power Act initiative petition drive announced
- July 28 - Sacramento City Attorney Robert Shinn comes out against statewide Water and Power initiative
- Aug 4 - Riverside Chamber of Commerce circulates claim of "City Against Country" over Los Angeles public power
- Aug 29 - Committee redraft of initiative accepted by Shinn with petition gathering for 120,000 signatures to begin
- Sept 29 - California state control of water and power urged by former Interior Secretary Gifford Pinchot
- Sept 14 - $500 million public Water and Power plan will be on the 1922 election
- Nov 15 - state funded Marshall survey of water resources begins
- Nov 22 - Water and Power initiative attacked by state senator
- Dec 29 - Herbert Hoover placed in charge of Colorado River Commission that is reviewing plan for Boulder dam
- Dec 29 - State railroad commission okays PG&E plan for $5 million to expand its Pit River hydro-electric developments
- Dec 31 - Water & Power Initiative qualifies for November 1922 statewide ballot

==== 1922-1932 ====
- 1922 Jan 1 - World's highest dam proposed at Boulder Canyon
- Jan 6 - The Water and Power Initiative qualifies for the November 1922 ballot
- Jan 22 - PG&E front group "Greater California League" attacks water and power act
- Feb 23 - Antioch decides to build reservoirs to store water to counter summer salt-water incursions
- Feb 24 - PG&E president attacks water and power act initiative at Modesto Progressive men's Business club
- Mar 7 - California State Irrigation Association comes out against water and power initiative
- Mar 17 - Boulder (Hoover) Dam okayed
- Apr 1 - Summary of the Water and Power Act debate held by the Commonwealth Club of California
- Apr 2 - Application for major Shasta water diversion by engineers from San Joaquin Light & Power company
- Apr 16 - Full page attack against Water and Power act published by S.F. Chronicle
- Apr 30 - San Francisco Chronicle claims water and Power act is an attempt to "foist communism on people"
- May 4 - Supreme Court to rule on PG&E ratebase inclusion of $52 million decision by state railroad commission
- Jun 11 - Robert Marshall comes out against the Water and power act (he later reverses himself)
- Sep 28 - Water and Power Act leader, Rudolph Spreckels blames power companies for his ouster at bank
- Sep 30 - First phase in PG&E's $100 million Pit River hydro-electric project turned on
- Oct 2 - Riverside Daily Press prints story that lies about Rudolph Spreckels and power and water act history
- Proposition 19 - Water and Power Initiative Summary and full wording
- Nov 9 - Proposition 19 (Water and Power Act) loses (243,604 to 597,453)
- Nov - 1922 Water and power Act initiative fails due to $3 million dollar electric industry PR campaign
- Water & Power Act electric company fraud investigated in 1934 by FTC. Testimony placed expenditure at over $1 million against initiative - working on cite -
- Dec 1 - Water Power Act supporters plan for a new initiative attempt for 1924
- 1923 Feb - California media fails to expose $14,000 bribe, uncovered during senate investigation, to California State Irrigation Association by electric front group for reversing support of water and power initiative
- Feb 12 - State Senate investigation exposes opponents spent $234,000 to stop the Water and Power initiative
- Feb 13 - San Francisco Civic League of Improvement given $4,000 to distribute 200,000 flyers against Water and Power initiative
- Feb 13 - Former SF Mayor and labor leader given $10,000 to oppose initiative while unions were all for it
- Feb 13 - Southern California newspaper reports $393,000 spent against water and power initiative
- Feb 16 - New PG&E filings with senate investigation place total spent against water and power initiative at over $500,000
- Feb 24 - P.H. McCarthy forced to resign from San Francisco Trades Council due to his role in water and power initiative
- Feb - Senate Hearings Summary - 1934 12-12 - Federal Trade Commission Investigation: pg 268-273 of 1922 initiative
- July 23 - Sacramento County voters form the Sacramento Municipal Utility District.
- 1924 Proposition 16 Water and Power Summary and full text
- Sept 3 - Col. Robert Marshall comes out in favor of power and water initiative
- Sept 6 - Arguments for and against Prop 16, the water and power act with Robert Marshall making the for statement
- Oct 28 – Robert Marshall speaks in favor of Water and Power Act
- Nov – California Municipalities League attempt at Water & Power fails again
- 1925 June 20 - San Francisco board of supervisors illegally sells Hetch Hetchy power to PG&E
- Note - Add link to actual propositions from hastings...
- 1926 Proposition 18 Water and Power summary and full text
- 1926 - California Water & Power Initiative fails for 3rd time
- 1927 - Cal Bulletin #18 Cal irrigation District Laws
- 1929 - $390,000 authorized to investigate state's water resources
- 1930 - Federal-State Water Resources Commission report proposes federal project
- 1931 - state water plan legislature report proposing new CVP plan
- Jan 30 - The Hoover-Young Commission report estimate that state water plan will cost $374 million

==== 1933-1939 ====
- 1933 Mar. 4 - Franklin D. Roosevelt sworn in as president includes major public works projects
- July 8 - Bureau of Reclamation (USBR) okays funding for Central Valley Act (CVP)
- Jul 15 - Details of CVP legislation announced with plan to cooperate with USBR
- Jul 20 - CVP bill stalls in legislature when rules committee blocks it
- Jul 22 - CVP legislation revived in state senate after federal support promised
- July 27 - California Legislature votes for CVP Act assembly passing it 58-9 senate passes vote 23-15.
- Aug - PG&E funds petition drive for referendum that was run by a company lawyer named Aherne
- Aug 5 - Governor signs $170 million CVP Act into law
- Dec 15 - Local state representative urges a yes vote on CVP while large PG&E opposed is to the right of article
- Dec 15 - SF Chamber of Commerce openly opposes CVP Act
- Dec 17 - CVP special election debate pros and cons along with map of project
- Dec 19 - Voter Information Guide for Proposition One - CVP special election
- Dec 19 - CVP referendum to go ahead wins 459,712 for to 426,109
- Dec 21 - Great Water Project vote increases CVP vote status
- CVP victory due to dead Catalina cow with Slovenian community vote over fisherman's felony conviction
- 1933 - SF Labor Council obtains PG&E political expenditures report to state
- 1933 - PG&E spent $275,737.18 on political and other donations according to State Railroad Commission
- 1934 Nov 6 - Sacramento, CA votes to form Sacramento Municipal Utility District (SMUD) and purchase PG&E properties with $12 million in bonds
- 1935 Jan 2 - PG&E files suit to try to overturn the formation of SMUD and its buyout of PG&E
- Aug 30 - Rivers and Harbors Act authorizes $12 million funding by Army Corps of Engineers for CVP - never happens
- Dec 2 - USBR takes over CVP, loans $4.2 million - new estimate increases to $228 million source 1942 CVP Writers Project

Dec 2 - USBR regulations stipulate that water only be given out to farmers with 160 acres of land or less - see 4-7-1944

- 1936 June 22 - Sacramento and San Joaquin Flood Control Studies okayed by Rivers and Harbors Act 1936
- Sept 12 - Ceremonies at Kennett for Shasta Dam
- Oct 19 - Contra Costa Canal Work begins
- Oct 22 - Governor hears $477 million CVP plan
- 1938 Mar 2 - State water authority commissioner opposed to agreement between PG&E and SMUD
- Jul 6 - contract $35.9 million for Shasta reservoir given
- Sept 8 - Shasta Construction work starts
- 1939 - Fortune Magazine Map of PG&E territory
- Nov 5 - Construction of $8.7 million Friant Dam begins
- Nov 27 - Pacific Gas & Electric Co. proposes to buy and distribute all of Shasta Dam power

==== 1940-1944 ====
- 1940 - US v. San Francisco Interior Sec. Ickes wins case to force San Francisco via the Raker Act to stop its sale of Hetch Hetchy water to PG&E
- Jan 7 - California legislature blocks Governor Olson proposal to unfreeze $170 CVP Bonds
- Jan 19 - Central Valley association spokesperson opposed to $50 million CVP bonds is actually a PG&E lobbyist
- Jan 22 - Interior Sec. Ickes advises state to set up Public utility market for Shasta at half PG&E prices
- Jan 24 - The Water Project Authority of California votes to delay Olson $50 million bond proposal until new study is done
- Jan 27 - Governor Olson opens legislative session with request for CVP Power bonds
- Jan 30 - Madera Irrigation District calls for vote about governor Olson's $50 million CVP bond proposal
- Feb 14 - Governor Olson and CVP senate supporters fail to get $50 million funding out of committee
- Feb 28 — State Water Project Authority creates four new jobs along with survey money from legislature allotment
- Mar 12 - U.S. Senate approves $5 million for CVP
- May 3 - Federal request for $191 million, including over $25 million to California for flood control following wet winter
- July 8 - First concrete poured at Shasta Dam
- Jul 22 - Sacramento and San Joaquin rivers diverted as work on CVP dams get underway
- Aug 20 - CVP Contra Costa canal delivers first water to city of Pittsburg
- Sep 25 - CVP will irrigate 3 million acres and allow for increased Central Valley population
- Oct 5 - Madera Tribune posts photo of USBR's Friant Dam construction
- Oct 19 - President Roosevelt signs rivers and harbors authorization bill (HR9972)with funds for CVP but includes limitation
- Nov 27 - Governor Olson goes to Washington to propose federal takeover of CVP due to state funding opposition
- Dec 6 - Another CVP dam proposed south of Shasta dam near Iron Mountain
- Dec 19 - Governor Olson obtains support for his CVP plan after meeting with president Roosevelt
- Dec 21 - State water commission requests a federal delay on PG&E's request for hyro work near Shasta dam
- 1941 Jan 8 - state senate proposal to expand the size of the CVP project to include Sacramento Valley
- Jan 20 - Congressional oversight of $446 million CVP project based on TVA model is ready
- Feb 14 - CVP contracts have helped companies in 40 different U.S. states
- Feb 21 - $50 million CVP federal funding in exchange for PG&E Feather River power
- Mar 20 - The state water authority budgets $200,000 for CVP work, including cooperative federal projects
- Apr 17 - Interior Secretary Ickes prepares legislation for federal oversight of the CVP
- Apr 30 - Congress approves a $34.7 million budget for CVP
- May 22 - State legislature agrees to include funding for CVP electricity
- Jul 28 - The CVP project is made a national defense priority with sped up on Keswick Dam contracts to start in August
- July 30 - Central Valley Indian Lands Acquisition Act promised to pay for all Wintu lands covered by Shasta dam
- Jul 31 - FDR signs CVP legislation that takes tribal lands that will be submerged by Shasta and Friant dams
- Aug 12 - First major contract for the $12.5 million Keswick dam awarded
- Sep 17 - CVP statistical report says 1.7 million acre feet of water being diverted from Sacramento River
- Oct 22 - $319,802 contract for 6 miles of Contra Costa Canal awarded
- Dec 30 - Regional director of the USBR, Charles E. is Carey selected by Ickes to develop market search for CVP power customers
- 1942 Jan 8 - CVP Shasta and Friant are the 2nd and 4th world's largest dams and rapidly being completed for the war
- Feb 26 - CVP's chief engineer gives detailed status report on CVP to Madera citizens
- Mar 20 - PG&E offers to buy all CVP power during House Appropriation Committee hearings
- Mar 25 - House committee deletes $15 million for transmission lines and CVP steam plant
- Mar 26 - Rep. Voorhis exposes prominent reason PG&E is behind blocking CVP power lines as Sacramento wants to break away from PG&E and buy power at a cheaper rate
- Mar 26 - PG&E gets permission from Federal Power Commission to build steam plant to block USBR's Antioch facility
- Aug 20 - The Madera Tribune congratulates Bertrand W. Gearhart on his role in promoting the CVP
- Nov 13 - Shasta dam nearly ready - construction work photo
- Nov 21 - Major segments of the CVP project halted by the War Production Board including transmission lines and Friant Dam PG&E allowed to take over CVP power at Shasta
- Nov 27 - state railroad commission sets price of PG&E electric property in Sacramento at $11.6 million
- Dec 22 - Ag Association spokesperson threatens city over city's push to buy power from CVP
- 1943 Jun 9 - $30.9 million funds sought for CVP as war power needs expanding
- Jun 19 - War Powers Board okays CVP Friant-Kern Canal funding
- Jul 20 - CVP Shasta to Oroville power line bids opened
- Sep 2 - Interior Secretary Ickes' order to build CVP transmission line attacked by Rep. Carter who represents Tulare county but lives in Oakland
- Sep 8 - San Francisco sends resolution to War Production Board calling for urgent completion of Friant-Kern Canal
- Sep 24 - CVP coordinator announces operational schedules including Friant dam diversion to start in 1944
- Sept 28 - Ickes announces PG&E contract to buy all Shasta dam power agreed to
- Dec 29 - War Production Board refuses to fund the CVP's Friant-Kern Canal
- 1944 Jan 14 - 90 year dream - Shasta reservoir is filling up
- Apr 7 - CVP coordinator will follow federal law and block big farms from obtaining CVP water
- Apr 14 - Madera Tribune calls Interior Secretary Ickes "Little Harold" over CVP following federal water use rules
- May 2 - Madera Tribune attacks "Oakies" and Interior Secretary "Little Harold" Ickes as a Czarist for retaining 160 acre water limit
- May 12 - President Roosevelt supports 40 year old 160 acre federal rule that CVP water will only go to small farmers
- Jun 8 - State Senate committee wants 160 acre limit lifted
- June 26 - Shasta dam starts producing Power from two generators
- Jul 20 - Quarter page PG&E Ad promotes its takeover of CVP power
- Jul 24 - Hearings begin on the federal 160 acre water limit campaign by wealthy farmers
- Jul 25 - PG&E starts taking Shasta dam power for resale
- July 26 - Sacramento phase of hearings end. Federal laws will not be broken say federal authorities - for wealthy interests
- Jul 30 - Week long CVP hearings in Bakersfield held by Senate subcommittee on irrigation - 160 acre water limit attacked
- Oct 11 - War Production Board reverses itself and delays work on Friant-Kern Canal
- Elliot Amendment to the Harbors and Rivers Act attempts to remove 160 acre water limit of the 1902 Reclamation Act fails

==== 1945 ====
- 1945 Jan 2 - USBR proposes spending $600 million for CVP
- Mar 22 - Rural congressional representatives want more control over CVP but don't want to pay for the system
- Apr 12 - USBR proposes spending $836 million on CVP
- Jun 4 - The state Chamber of Commerce promotes the takeover of the Central valley project when completed
- Jun 8 - Chairman of the Central Valley Project Congress advocates cheap power development for San Joaquin Vallery farmers
- Jul 18 - state water authority funded to evaluate possibility of purchasing the $340 million CVProject
- Sep 6 - New 300 page CVP report calls for dramatic $527 million increase to project for total of $735 million (map)
- Sep 27 - The wartime ban on construction will end in October with $15 million available to start on Friant Dam
- Oct 30 - Attack on federal limits to CVP water for farms less than 160 acres is actually 320 leaving out only giant operations
- Nov 24 - USBR introduces CVP plan to Congress with 38 proposed dams
- Nov 26 - CVP funding ends up in hostile subcommittee that cuts all transmission and power funding
- Nov 27 - U.S. House appropriations committee cuts budge for transmission lines for CVP
- Nov 28 - SF Chronicle fails to mention $5 million cut on transmission line budget, only mentions $780,000 left
- Nov 29 - Chamber of Commerce hears claim that federal control over the CVP is totalitarian
- Nov 30 - SF Chronicle promotes Mendota 42,000 acre family farmer's opinion that employs 400 regular and 1,000 Mexican migratory workers
- Dec 7 - Two day statewide water conference begins with fighting over 160 acre ban
- Dec 8 - The first statewide water conference in 18 years is moderated by Governor Warren - the war of big vs. small farmers
- Dec 26 - Madera Tribune's attempt to be neutral about the 160 acre fight

==== 1946-1949 ====
- 1946 Apr 5 - small town newspaper uses front group to call Dept. of Public Works communistic for funding CVP project
- Apr 9 - 96,000 acre feet of Friant dam water released in March 1946 for irrigation of valley
- May 3 - President Truman announces plan to expand scope of CVP
- Jun 18 - CVP obtains $20 million funding for most of its projects
- Jun 22 - Sacramento Municipal Utility District $10.5 million in bonds to purchase PG&E vote agreed to
- Jun 26 - U.S. Senate funding for CVP reduced from $225 million to $12.5 million
- Sep 24 - PG&E announces $160 million budget to expand power output
- Nov 30 - Interior Sec. Krug says need for water and power from CVP being held up by "one or two large corporations"
- 1947 Jan 6 - Republican control of state legislature results in funding for only a CVP study
- Jan 6 - Democrats push investigation of monopolist takeover of CVP
- Feb 14 - President Truman requests $30 million including $5 million for CVP transmission lines for the next fiscal year
- Feb 19 - If the 160 acre law is banned 20 giant Central Valley companies will get water monopoly
- Feb 20 - Small farmers and labor oppose repeal of CVP 160 acre water limit
- Feb 27 - 61% of $384 million CVP costs will be paid by electric sales
- Mar 17 - Senator introduces bill to exempt CVP from USBR's 160 acre ban
- Jun 3 - Sixteen day 160 acre ban hearing by Senate ends, no action taken
- Jul 28 - $29 million CVP budget split between Army Corps and U.S.B.R. with $1.5 million for transmission lines
- Sep 18 - CVP project funding and speed to increased with hope to complete entire project by 1950
- Dec 3 - Governor Warren seeks emergency CVP funding
- Dec 23 - $11.4 million emergency funds for CVP project granted as senator tries to get CVP head fired over 160 acre ban
- 1948 Jan 12 - President Truman submits a $42 Million CVP budget for next year
- Jan 15 - Proposal to expand CVP to American River
- Jan 22 - San Joaquin Valley farmers sign 19 contracts for 320,000 acre feet of water
- Feb 25 - with another drought, the Stale Water Project authority requests $55.6 million for CVP
- Mar 5 - USBR will seek Truman veto if California republican try to overthrow 160 acre ban
- Mar 18 - two farm groups on opposite of the 160 acre debate
- Jun 5 - Governor Warren supports CVP transmission system - see confusion headline
- Jul 6 - CVP budget for 1948-49 year set at $68.5 million
- Jul 19 - New CVP work to include expansion of Shasta dam power Klamath River and Santa Barbara projects
- Aug 6 - $50 million fund sought to buy up large farms and resell them to small farmers
- Oct 7 - Chamber of Commerce threatens legal fights over CVP's reclamation laws
- Oct 13 - Interior Secretary Krug warns farmers that California electric companies are blocking CVP project
- Nov 30 - State Water Project Authority urges 160 acre law removal
- 1949 - Map of Central Valley Cotton producers
- Mar 30 - Major Congressional victory as subcommittee okays transmission lines as part of CVP $53.5 million budget
- Jul 2 - Cal. Assembly funds study to buy CVP
- Jul 9 - 15,000 attend Governor Warren's release of Friant dam water into San Joaquin valley
- Jul 11 - Media says 100 years in the making as 20,000 people attend opening of $58 million Friant-Kern Canal
- Jul 13 - US Senate boosts CVP annual funding to $60.8 million
- Jul 21 - Senator Downey (R-CA) demands investigation of USBR and it continued 160 acre ban
- Aug 2 - Congress tentatively agrees to fund two more CVP canals for $20–40 million
- Aug 25 - Madera Tribune writes highly manipulative article suggesting Public Power advocates had increased funding yet story details how Senator Knowland (R-Ca) amendment stripped transmission funding
- Aug 30 - President Truman proposes $1 billion CVP expansion for 38 dams and 25 power facilities
- Sep 27 - Friant dam is fourth largest dam in world - details of history and construction
- Sep 27 - U.S. Senate okays CVP addition of $110 million for American River development
- Nov 14 - USBR plans to begin moving water from Sacramento Valley into the San Joaquinn Valley in 1951
- Dec 2 - CVP deal contract with Madera Irrigation District almost settled

==== 1950-1954 ====
- 1950 Feb 3 - Gov Warren supports $69 million CVP budget for 1951
- Mar 16 - California house members cut $4 million of power project out of CVP budget
- Apr 14 - The Agricultural Council of California calls the USBR's public power operations socialist
- May 8 - Warning that government should withdraw from CVP if 160 acre ban on water rights removed
- Jun 17 - PG&E attacked by Governor Warren for blocking CVP projects during Shasta Dam dedication
- Sep 19 - Detailed overview of how CVP works and impacts to Madera Irrigation District

1951 Jan 3 - CVP and state agree to keep grasslands flooded to protect migratory birds

- Apr 20 - $18.3 of the $33.8 million CVP annual budget earmarked for Friant-Kern Canal
- May 13 - Friant-Kern Canal completed
- Jul 5 - The California legislature passes legislation to build the Oroville dam and power facilities as part of the CVP system
- Aug 1 - Shasta Dam starts sending water into CVP canals
- Aug 8 - Friant dam ceremony exposes new rift as state court orders excess water released as tactic to flood aquifer
- Sep 13 - PG&E advertisement claim that 55% of all Central Valley water comes from aquifers by electric pumps
- Sep 25 - Madera Tribune does extended coverage of CVP as major milestone in project is completed with historic map
- Sep 25 - History of the Reclamation Act as part of Madera Tribune celebration issue
- Sep 25 - Unnamed (big) farmers take Madera Irrigation District water contract with USBR to court
- 1952 Feb 23 - USBR proposes CVP Power plan that would takeover local PG&E project and spark major growth in Fresno
- Mar 1 - USBR reports 1951 income of $8 million from water sales for 1951
- Mar 21 - $34.9 million budget okayed by congress for construction activities
- May 2 - Sixteen large farmers representing 14,000 acres agree to take CVP water and eventually abide by 160 acre rule
- Dec 13 - SMUD makes contract to buy CVP power from USBR
- California legislature appropriated $10 million for investigation into state purchase of CVP
- 1953 Jan 9 - President Truman asks for $83 million for CVP construction
- Jan 10 – 110 foot coffer dam at CVP's $58 million Folsom dam breached - no deaths from flooding
- Jan 24 - Madera Tribune enraged that USBR signs a long-term contract to sell 17% of CVP excess power to the Sacramento Municipal Utility District
- Jan 28 - Lawsuit to stop all major water diversions a threat to the CVP
- Apr 23 - House Committee headed by Ca. representatives cuts $7 million from $19 million CVP budget, all from power projects
- May 20 - USBR request to senate that it reinstates $7 million pulled from CVP's power and transmission budget
- May 28 - State legislature tries to block irrigation district contracts with USBR
- Sep 26 - Full details of the size and cost of Friant dam - the 4th largest concrete dam in world
- Dec 28 - Republicans, corporate farms and state Chamber of Commerce push for state to buy CVP from Interior Dept.
- 1954 BR report: Four dams, five canals and other systems have been completed at a cost of $435.4 million
- Jan 21 - President Eisenhower asks for $70.4 million CVP budget
- May 4 PG&E offers to buy CVP power and facilities for $130 million cash
- Aug 27 - Central Valley Project Act Reauthorization
- Sep 10 - Proposal for $230 million San Luis segment of the CVP announced includes map

==== 1955-1959 ====
- 1955 Feb 21 - PG&E makes proposal to buy CVP power from Trinity dam for $3.5 million a year
- Apr 14 - US BR ignores PG&E's proposal to take over the electric system of the $219 million Trinity dam
- Jul 14 - Urgent need for more water results in Trinity project moving ahead as San Luis project not ready
- Jul 16 - CVP $15 million budget for 1956 will be to complete Folsom Dam and being work on Trinity Dam
- 1956 May 21 - Congress appropriates $83 million for irrigation with $20 million going to Central Valley projects including a Tulare Lake dam
- Jul 19 - US BR announces plans to construct the Glen Canyon Dam and $42 million for five CVP projects for 1957
- 1957 - Fear based 28 minute video pushing to expand state expansion of water project
- Feb 20 - PG&E attacks republican senators opposition to PG&E's proposal for joint construction of Trinity Dam project
- Jun 13 - $88 million for California was given but excluded all funding for transmission systems
- Oct 14 - U.S. Supreme Court agrees to hear the USBR's 160-acre ban on big water users
- Oct 29 - 5 million acre feet a year being extracted from Central Valley's aquifer
- Nov 1 - CVP's Feather River project considered world's largest engineering project
- 1958 Jan 23 - PG&E agrees to renegotiate rates it charges for CVP power after report discloses company's rate manipulation
- Feb 5 - Interior Secretary Fred A. Seaton recommends that PG&E be allowed to take over Trinity Dam power
- Mar 5 - CVP Plan to add 2 million acre feet of water in San Joaquin Valley endorsed
- May 26 - Proposal for San Luis Canal project and 500,000 acres of land in western Merced, Fresno and Kings counties
- Jun 9 - Congress okays $42 million budget for coming CVP's next fiscal year
- Jun 23 - U.S. Supreme Court reverses state supreme court in upholding the 160-acre ban on USBR water to large users
- Oct 15 - Total of 444,000 Kilowatts of CVP power being transfer to PG&E
- 1959 Feb 13 - PG&E plan to build "cream skimmer" transmission lines between Bonneville and CVP attacked
- Mar 18 - representative James B. Utt introduces legislation to turn all Trinity Dam power over to PG&E
- Apr 27 - Two more dams proposed for CVP project
- May 12 - Governor Brown releases breakdown on where $1.75 billion funding for State Water Project will go to
- Jun 3 - Congress okays $103 Million with $43 to USBR and $59.8 to Corps of Engineers for state irrigation and flooding
- Oct 21 - California Grange opposed to state takeover of Oroville Dam and giving PG&E control of Trinity Dam electricity
- Jul 9 - Governor Brown signs $1.75 billion state water bond law that includes 735 foot high Oroville Dam
- Sep 30 - Interior Department signs two new contracts with PG&E for 629,000 Kilowatts of CVP electricity from four dams
- Sep 30 - Madera Irrigation District opposed Fresno plan to take San Joqauin River surplus water
- Sep 30 - Interior Department extends PG&E contracts for CVP Power up to April 1971

==== 1960-1969 ====
- 1960 State and USBR cooperation Agreement
- Jul 1 - Congress okays $61 million CVP budget
- 1961 Feb 2 - State takes first step in $400 State Water Project
- Aug 10 - History of EBMUD and the November 1959 $1.7 billion state water project vote
- 1962 - May 17 - $27 million joint CVP funding project proposed
- 1963 - Corps of Engineers dredges the Sacramento Deep Water Ship Channel to the port of Sacramento.
- Jan 18 - Congress to propose $106 million annual CVP Budget
- Mar 2 - Governor Brown Announced $325 Million plan to fund state water project
- May 24 - State Senate votes against Governor Brown's proposal to fund state plan with bonds
- June 11 - Attempts by Republicans to kill the sale of $325 million in bonds for state water project fails
- Dec 15 - Extended summary of all the state's new water plans laid out in series of articles by agency
- 1964 Jan 13 - SMUD, EBMud and growing construction of dams background story on state water expansion
- Jan 21 - Utility Districts across the state will benefit from expansion of the state water project (map of state plan)
- Jan 22 - $112 million annual CVP budget proposed to congress with state to include $42 million for San Luis
- 1965 - Inter-agency Delta Committee recommendation for Peripheral Canal and Delta facilities
- Jan 14 - City of Santa Clara asked LBJ for direct access to CVP vs. PG&E power
- July 23 - $5 billion San Luis Reservoir segment of the CVP begins construction
- Aug 4 - PG&E Hydro-electric project connects 3 rivers near Shasta
- Aug 6 - Auburn-Folsom Project goes before congress for funding
- Sept 16 - Governor Brown request $188 million for CVP funding
- 1966 Jan 25 - President Johnson asks Congress for $100 million CVP annual budget
- Mar 11 - 21st Century water shortage predicted if system not expanded
- Apr 3 - State water project good until 1990 but won't handle predicted 54 million population expected by 2020
- Apr 26 - State seeks $164 million from feds for CVP's 1967 fiscal year
- 1967 Jan 13 - CVP produces record 5.3 billion kilowatts hours of electricity in 1966
- Jan 25 - President Johnson withholds $34 million for CVP's San Luis project
- Oct 6 - State Water Project's Oroville Dam and Reservoir are completed
- Oct 18 - State Assemblyman seeks $600 million in Bonds for the state's water project
- 1968 Feb 8 - State budgets $425 million for state's water project
- Apr 19 - CVP's San Luis Reservoir dedicated
- May 16 - $468 million cut to proposed on CVP's Auburn Dam project
- Dec 28 - Interior Dept. okays new CVP plan along east side of valley
- 1969 - State Water Project obtains emergency loan from state treasury as inflation rates have dried up funding from bond sales
- 1969 - The Harvey O. Banks Delta Pumping Plant and John E. Skinner Fish Facility are completed by DWR

==== 1970-1979 ====
- 1970 Mar 15 - Army Corps of Engineers announces construction of 625 foot high New Melones Dam
- Apr 30 - Governor Reagan promotes $209 million 43 mile long, 400 foot wide Peripheral Canal plan
- 1971 Jan 29 - Nixon administration proposes $150 million for state water projects
- Feb 15 - NCPA files Writ with CPUC to stop PG&E power contract with SMUD for Rancho Seco surplus power
- Mar 18 - Sierra Club files lawsuit to shut down the CVP
- Jul 23 - California State Water Resources Control Board sets CVP water quality standards.
- Jul 30 - California Water Resources Association attacks passage of Wild and Scenic Rivers legislation
- Oct 8 - New association of state agencies formed to promote water projects
- 1972 Jan 20 - Labor Leader says 45 corporations with 3.7 million acres gets illegal USBR water subsidies
- May 25 - Proposition 9 ban on nuclear development will endanger CVP says California Water Resources Association
- Aug 10 - $4.9 million CVP contract for 25 of 188 mile long San Luis drain awarded
- Dec 7 - GAO study says big landowners received $1.5 billion CVP water subsidy
- 1973 - legislation funds new Delta levees
- Feb 9 - Nixon administration blocks $2 million in CVP funds okayed by Congress
- 1974 Feb 14 - History of Peripheral canal plan dates to 1964
- Jul 11 - 29,000-acre Giffen Inc. broken up and sold to comply with 160-acre USBR rules
- Sept 25 - Environmental review for 43 mile long Peripheral canal released
- 1975 Sept 4 - Healdsburg joins 10 NCPA other cities to obtain its own electricity
- 1976 Jan 28 - USBR says there will be enough water for the year as drought continues
- Mar 24 - 59 farmers file $33 million lawsuit against CVP and SWP for 1974 flood damages
- Apr 22 - Eight mile Pacheco tunnel from San Luis reservoir to Santa Clara started
- 1977 - Department of Water Resources supports Peripheral Canal as best way move water to the Delta
- Feb 8 - USBR announces plan to cut CVP water by up to 75% due to drought
- Feb 25 - Westland's Land Dynamics Inc. pleads guilty and fined $10,000 for conspiracy to violate land sale rules
- Apr 17 - President Carter stops 15 water projects including review of CVP
- Apr 21 - Salyer Land and J.G. Boswell Cos. (cotton growers) propose buying $45 million Pine Flat Dam to bypass 160-acre rule
- Sept 15 - Assembly votes 56-22 in favor of SB 346 Peripheral Canal legislation
- Sept 16 - Senate votes down Governor Brown's $4.2 billion Peripheral Canal proposal
- Oct 6 - USBR lost $74 million between 1971 and April 1976 for underpricing electricity sold to PG&E
- Nov 5 - 529 page federal report says USBR has failed to breakup corporate ownership in Westlands over 160 acre limit on water subsidies
- Nov 5 - Government task force report documents $2.7 billion water subsidy to CVP farmers at taxpayers expense
- Nov 5 - Report documents how the USBR's 197 mile long San Luis drain (Kesterson) in the Westlands went from $7 million to $542 million
- Nov 30 - Roberts Farm Inc's 8,100 acre operations in Kern county goes bankrupt and sold for $21.5 million
- Dec 11 - The Chandler family's L.A. Times caught in conflict of Interest over newspaper's attack on 160-acre limit as family owns major investments in Tejon Ranch and J.G. Boswell Company
- Dec 19 - California v. U.S. Supreme Court case over control of discharge rights
- 1978 - California State Water Resources Control Board releases Water Rights Decision 1485 (D-1485) requiring Delta water quality
- Jan 6 - Call for one year moratorium over 160-acre ban ruling and Interior Dept decision
- Jan 26 - CVP water rates too cheap as study shows project will be $8.8 billion in debt by 2037
- Feb 8 - PG&E making 800% profit on CVP power it buys
- Feb 20 - Federal Land Bank of Sacramento ignores 160-acre CVP rlimit rule when issuing loans to large farmers
- Mar 18 - Sec. of Interior urges cooperative operations - state charges $22 vs. CVP charging $3.50 per acre foot of water
- July 4 - US Supreme Court rules in favor of state over right to enforce environmental regulations
- Sep 20 - Lobbyists for Salyer Land and J.G. Boswell Cos. who own 150,000-acres of cotton lands paid $165,000 to fight 160-acre limit
- Nov 8 - Fish and Wildlife Improvement Act of 1978 (16 U.S.C. 742l; 92 Stat. 3110) -- Public Law 95-616 updates CVP Act
- Nov 21 - Westlands Irrigation District legal Budget for 1979 set at $549,000 to fight the federal government
- 1979 Jan 3 - Dept. of Interior agrees to abide by state's environmental quality rules
- Jan 16 - Bill to allocate $50 Million for state water project including money for Peripheral canal introduced
- Feb 25 - J.G. Boswell investigated for secret contract by Grand Jury with Cotton Inc. (lobby firm) $113 million 10 year budget
- Mar 8 - US Dept. of Agriculture expands probe of Boswell-Cotton Inc. $60,000 annual contract for Cotton Board research and promotion
- Mar 11 - Westlands Irrigation District hires Washington lawfirm of Williams & Connolly to represent their 160-acre legal fight
- Mar 22 - Senate hearings open on the Reclamation Reform Act of 1979 - to replace the 160-acre limit for USBR water
- Mar 23 - Western water war erupts over hundreds of millions of acres of subsidized lands with call to change 160-acre limitation
- Apr 13 - Support for study calling for 200 foot increase of Shasta Dam
- Oct 11 - Regional battle between farmers and environmentalists hold up dams and Peripheral Canal plans

==== 1980-1989 ====
- 1980 Mar 13 - State legislature passes SB200 Peripheral Canal act opposed by ecologists
- Oct 18 - Santa Clara power users sue agency for $18 million over rates
- 1981 Oct 21 - CVP proposal to sell power to city of Healdsburg announced
- 1982 - Voters defeat the Peripheral Canal initiative - Proposition 9
- Apr 29 - Santa Cruz to do study on takeover of PG&E power grid
- Apr 30 - Healdsburg to start buying CVP power from Westeran Area Power Administration
- May 4 - Healdsburg breaks from PG&E power
- August 4 - PG&E claims Healdsburg owes them $62,000 as city goes for public power
- 1983 Oct 2 - Republicans moves away from conservation on Central Valley water
- 1984 May 5 - National Wildlife Federation says USBR under collected water fees by $10 billion
- Nov 16 - Federal plan to dump Central Valley waste water into Pacific attacked
- 1985 Mar 30 - Interior Dept plan to stop dumping Central Valley toxics into Kesterson
- Aug 21 - CVP has made $1.5 billion in illegal subsidies to giant ag farms
- Sep 10 - House passes on cooperative agreement between CVP and SWP
- 1986 - DWR-USBR Coordinated Operation Agreement, agreed to by Congress.
- Nov 27 - Ceremony held in Sacramento on agreement between CVP and SWP
- 1987 - State Water Board starts revision of D-1485 after U.S. EPA calls plan inadequate.
- 1988 - Suisun Marsh salinity control gates start up.
- May 28 - 2nd Dry year starting to impact CVP water supply
- 1989 - EPA lists Sacramento River Chinook salmon as threatened
- Feb 16 - USBR announces 25-50% reduction in water availability due to 3 year drought
- May 3 - USBR investigation of expanding Tehama-Colusa Canal
- June 23 - PG&E loses court case over its refusal to transmit power to public agencies

==== 1990-1999 ====
- 1990 Feb 16 - 4th year of drought expected to cause cutbacks in water to users
- Jul 15 - $150 million environmental CVP legislation angers farmers and PG&E
- 1991 - State Water Board produces Bay-Delta salinity control plan but partially rejected by the EPA
- Construction completed on four south Delta pumping facilities
- Jan 30 - 800 attend statewide meeting on water crisis solutions
- Feb 13 - Water Rights issue grow as 5th year of drought calls for 50% farm water cutbacks
- Feb 15 - Water crisis worst since 1945, CVP to drain all reservoirs with up 75% restrictions in use
- Mar 16 - Recent storms reduce water crisis but orders for reduced use to hold
- 1992 - The Central Valley Project Improvement Act mandated the balancing of water, pricing and distribution policies
- Jan 1 - U.S. Corps of Engineers releases environmental plan for 3,400 acre Yolo Country wildlife refuge
- Feb 13 - Bush administration submits $906 million USBR budget for 1993 including CVP
- Oct 30 - Reclamation Projects Authorization and Adjustment Act of 199—Public Law 102-575
- Nov 18 - New federal legislation will give Yolo and Solano County CVP water
- 1993 - A documented indicator species, the Delta smelt is listed as threatened (goes to endangered in 2009)
- 1993 - Save San Francisco Bay Association's Barry Nelson calls the CVP "the biggest single environmental disaster ever to strike California."
- Feb 18 - USBR open new office to oversee 1992 CVP Improvement Act
- Dec 17 - Governor Wilson attacks federal plans to withhold water for environment
- 1994 Feb 16 - Drought response results in 2/3rd cut in farm waters
- Apr 10 - Judge blocks attempt to sell CVP water to mining company
- Sep 19 - Pajaro Valley loses 19,000 acre feet of CVP water due to legal technicality
- 1995 Jul 18 - Folsom Dam gate breaks releasing half million acre feet of water
- 1996 Oct 12 - Pajaro Valley water agency decides to buy $5.6 million in CVP water rights
- Dec 21 - Kern County plan to sell 22 billion gallons of water to L.A. starts water war
- 1997 - $80 million temperature controlled fish protection support added to Shasta dam
- Sept 13 - Cadillac Desert author supports more subsidies to farmers
- Dec 14 - Proposal to sell Friant dam water to L.A. reduced to just excess flow years
- 1998 May 29 - Measure D in Pajaro Valley alternative to CVP plan attacked for conservation and small dams
- Jun 3 - Measure D passes, effectively ending plan to import CVP water into Pajaro Valley

==== 2000-2009 ====
- 2000 - Westlands Water District sues the USBR over drainage promises and wins $2.6 billion agreement
- Jun 9 - $450 million water plan proposed by Governor Davis includes raising Shasta dam height
- 2002 Feb 13 - Appeal of court ruling taking CVP water from fish and environment
- Jul 17 - Westlands wants feds to buy contaminated land for $500 million
- 2004 - CalFed budget zeroed out for fifth year in a row as attempts to find common ground fail
- Apr 22 - Editorial: death of 34,000 fish on Klamath impacts Hupa tribe
- Jul 14 - Court order allows for protection of fish in Trinity River
- 2005 Mar 16 - CVP water resold by users as 200,000 acres in Westland's too toxic for growing
- 2006 - San Joaquin water flows restored to protect fish
- 2007 May 25 - Federal court overturns U.S. Fish and Wildlife's 2005 opinion that increased CVP water take would not endanger Smelt
- Oct 25 - "Racanelli Decision" - Judge decides in favor of Aug. 1978 decision (1485) compelling USBR and DWR adhere to the State Water Resources Control Board's water quality standards
- 2008 - Central Valley Project Improvement Act's fisheries program conducts "Listen to the River" independent peer review
- Apr 9 - CVP's Lewiston dam predicted to have a normal reservoir levels for year
- Aug 9 - The Kern County Water Agency buys state water for as cheap as $28 and sells it for up to $200 and acre
- 2009 - A documented indicator species, the Delta smelt is listed under the ESA as endangered (listed as threatened in 1993)
- Mar 11 - Drought fears recede after recent rain bring CVP's Lewiston dam up to 59% of normal
- May 24 - How the Ca. Dept. of Water Resources lost control of the Kern Country Water Bank
- Jun 5 - National Oceanic and Atmospheric Administration releases 4 year study on fish impacts
- Oct 7 - Trinity County protests USBR's petition to extend state water rights to 2030

==== 2010-2020 ====
- 2010 Jun 3 - Environmental groups file a lawsuit seeking to block a secret backroom deal – known as the "Monterey Amendments"
- Dec 15 - The release of the Bay Delta Conservation Plan, or the reincarnation of peripheral canal is immediately opposed by environmental groups
- 2012 Mar 2 - Court of Appeals ends thirteen year legal battle between Westlands and Interior Dept in government's favor
- 2014 May 14 - 10% of all California goes to Almond production
- Nov 4 - After 5 years of reworking, the public okays $510 million in state water funding
- 2015 Jan 27 - Harvard University has bought 10,000 acres California land for Wine production and water speculation
- Apr 21 - California Almond production is using over 1 trillion gallons of agricultural water
- Sep 11 - USBR announces agreement with Westlands water contract and drainage controversy
- 2017 Jan 3 - HR 23 Central Valley Project Water Reliability introduced and passed by house fails in senate would have stripped all CVP environmental protections
- Feb 17 - CVP's Oroville Dam spillway water levels result in 180,000 people forced to evacuate
- Mar 17 - House republicans invoke the "God Squad" option of the Endangered Species Act Amendments of 1978 to overturn water limits caused by the endangered Smelt
- Jun 10 - Trump admin proposes selling off all grid assets of the Power Marketing Administration
- 2018 - Congress set aside $20 million to raise Shasta dam by 18.5' or an additional 636,000 acre feet of water a year
- 2019 Aug 1 - Meeting to start new Delta Tunnel by state agencies held
- Sep 8 - Westlands Irrigation District appeals court decision to block raising height of CVP's Shasta dam
- Aug 21 - Trump admin suppresses report on dangers to Steelhead Salmon
- Oct 23 - Dept. of Interior changes water rules in favor of farmers
- 2020 - Jan 1 - No Smelt indicator species found in the Sacramento Delta for last 2 years
- Feb 20 - President Trump signs Record of Decision on federal biological opinions
- Feb 29 - Seventy five project customers, including the large Westlands Water District, received permanent federal water contracts

== Facilities in the Sacramento Valley ==
=== Sacramento River ===
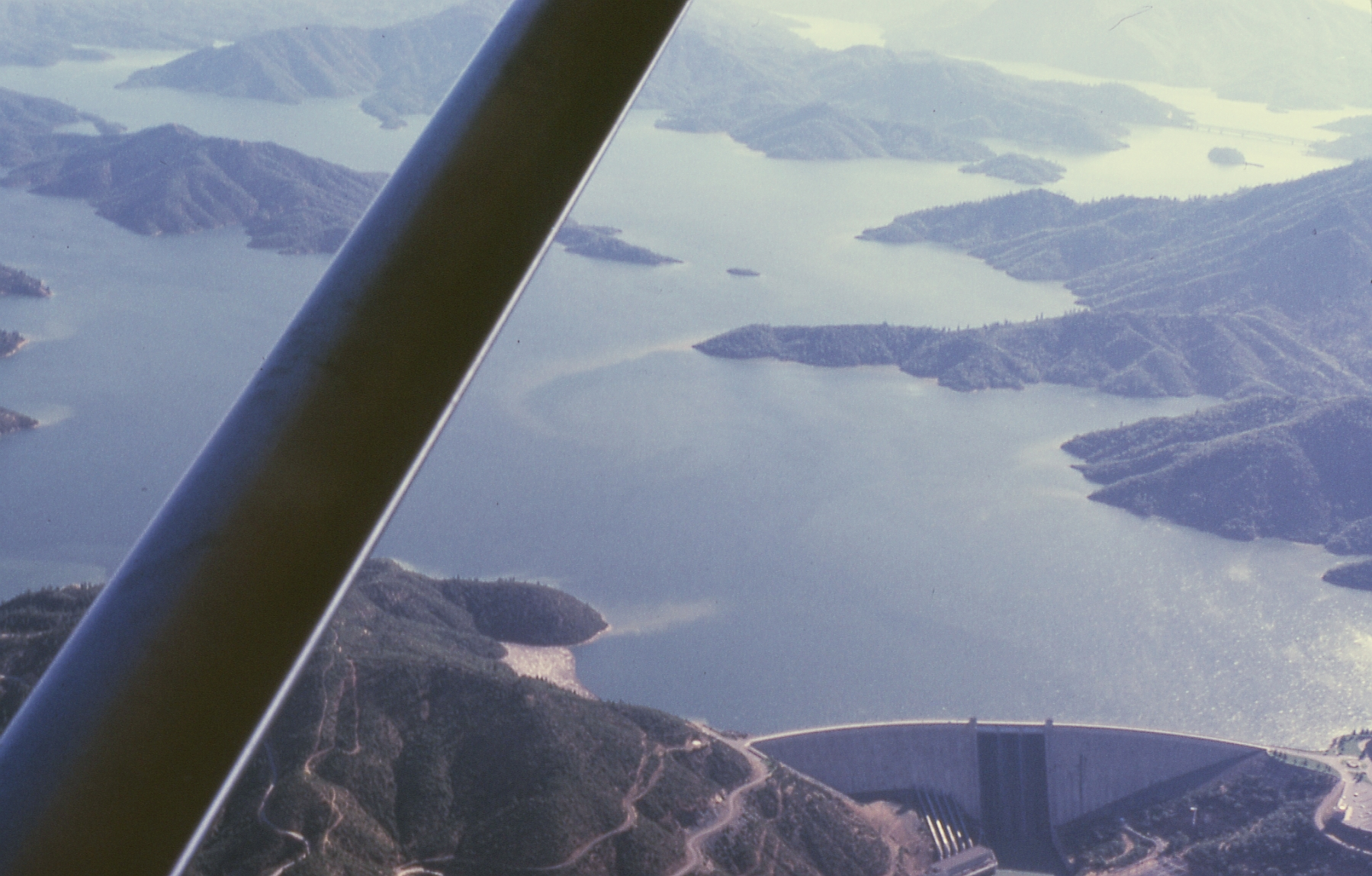
Shasta Dam, with Shasta Lake at its highest level, July 1965

Shasta Division consists of a pair of large dams on the Sacramento River north of the city of Redding. The Shasta Dam is the primary water storage and power generating facility of the CVP. It impounds the Sacramento River to form Shasta Lake, which can store over 4,500,000 acre-feet (5,600,000 dam^{3}) of water, and can generate 680 MW of power. Shasta Dam functions to regulate the flow of the Sacramento River so that downstream diversion dams and canals can capture the flow of the river more efficiently, and to prevent flooding in the Sacramento-San Joaquin Delta where many water pump facilities for San Joaquin Valley aqueducts are located. The Keswick Dam functions as an afterbay (regulating reservoir) for the Shasta Dam, also generating power.

The Sacramento Canals Division of the CVP takes water from the Sacramento River much farther downstream of the Shasta and Keswick Dams. Diversion dams, pumping plants, and aqueducts provide municipal water supply as well as irrigation of about 100,000 acres (4,000,000 dam^{2}). The Red Bluff Diversion Dam diverts part of the Sacramento River into the 110-mile (180 km) Tehama-Colusa Canal, the 21-mile (34 km) Corning Canal and a small reservoir formed by Funks Dam. Six pump plants take water from the canal and feed it to the Colusa County water distribution grid.

=== Trinity River ===
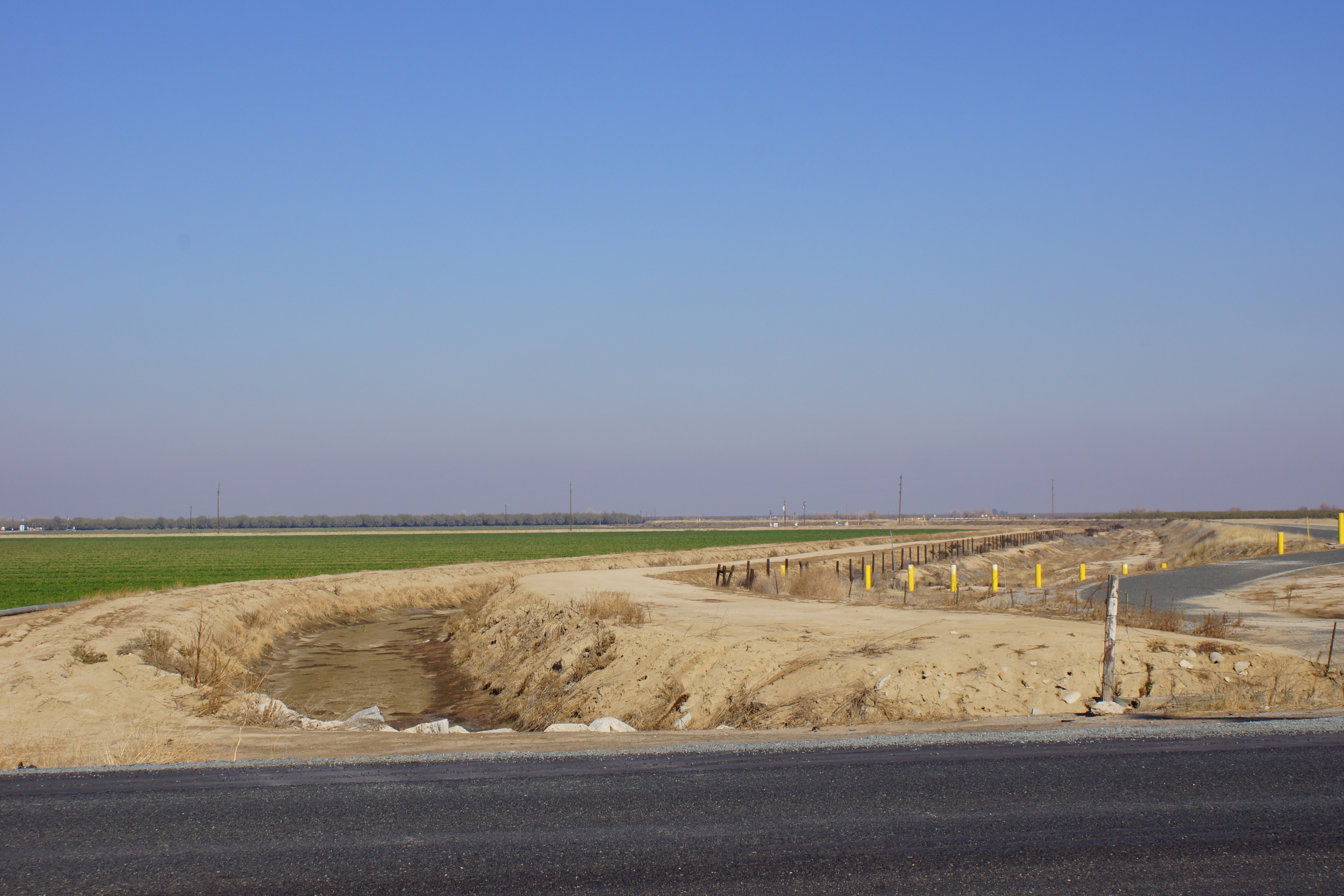
Drainage ditch in Central Valley Project

Water diversions from northern rivers in the state remain controversial due to environmental damage. Trinity River Division is the second largest CVP department for the northern Sacramento Valley. The primary purpose of the division is to divert water from the Trinity River into the Sacramento River drainage downstream of Shasta Dam in order to provide more flow in the Sacramento River and generating peaking power in the process. Trinity Dam forms Trinity Lake, the second largest CVP water-storage reservoir, with just over half the capacity of Shasta and a generating capacity of 140 MW. Lewiston Dam, downstream of Trinity Dam, diverts water into the Clear Creek Tunnel, which travels to empty into a third reservoir, Whiskeytown Lake on Clear Creek, a tributary of the Sacramento River, generating 154 MW of power in the process. Whiskeytown Lake (formed by Clair. A Hill Whiskeytown Dam) in turn provides water to the Spring Creek Tunnel, which travels into the lowermost extreme of Spring Creek, a stream that flows into Keswick Reservoir, generating another 180 MW of electricity. From there the water from the Trinity River empties into Keswick Reservoir and the Sacramento River. In 1963, the Spring Creek Debris Dam was constructed just upstream of the outlet of the Spring Creek Tunnel, to prevent acid mine drainage from the Iron Mountain Mine from continuing downstream and contaminating the river.

=== American River ===
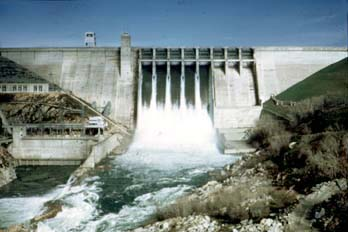
Folsom Dam spilling during a flood

The American River Division is located in north-central California, on the east side of the Great Central Valley. Its structures use the water of the American River, which drains off the Sierra Nevada and flows into the Sacramento River. The division is further divided into three units: the Folsom, Sly Park and Auburn-Folsom South. The American River Division stores water in the American River watershed, to both provide water supply for local settlements, and supply it to the rest of the system. The dams also are an important flood control measure. Hydroelectricity is generated at Folsom and Nimbus dams, and marketed to the Western Area Power Administration.

The Folsom Unit consists of Folsom Dam, its primary water storage component, and Nimbus Dam, which serves as its downstream forebay. The Folsom Dam is located on the American River, and stores 1,010,000 acre-feet (1,250,000 dam^{3}) of water in its reservoir, Folsom Lake. Folsom Lake covers 11,550 acres (4,670 ha) and is located inside the Folsom Lake State Recreational Area. Eight additional earth fill saddle dams are required to keep the reservoir from overflowing. The dam also generates 200 MW from three generators. About 7 mi (11 km) downstream of Folsom Dam is the Nimbus Dam, forming Lake Natoma. The dam generates 7.7 MW from two Kaplan turbines on the north side of the river. The Nimbus Fish Hatchery is located downstream of Nimbus Dam, to compensate for the two dams' destruction of American River spawning grounds.

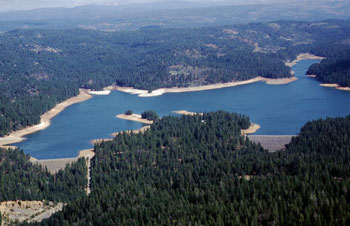
Sly Park Dam (left) and auxiliary dam (right)

The Sly Park Unit includes Sly Park Dam, Jenkinson Lake, the Camp Creek Diversion Dam, and two diversion tunnels. The Sly Park Dam and its similarly sized auxiliary dam form Jenkinson Lake, which covers 650 acres (260 ha). Jenkinson Lake feeds the Camino Conduit, a 5 mi (8.0 km) aqueduct. The Camp Creek Diversion Dam diverts some water from Camp Creek into Jenkinson Lake.

The third unit is the Auburn-Folsom South Unit, consisting of several dams on American River tributaries. These include Sugar Pine Dam and Pipeline (supplying water to Foresthill), and the uncompleted Folsom South Canal. The primary component of the unit, concrete thin-arch Auburn Dam, was to be located on the North Fork of the American, but was never built because of the significant risk of earthquakes in the area, and general public opposition to the project. However, the high Foresthill Bridge, built as part of the preliminary work for Auburn Dam, still stands. County Line Dam, about 10 miles (16 km) south of Folsom Dam, was also never built.

== Facilities in the San Joaquin Valley ==
=== Delta and canal system ===
One of the most important parts of the CVP's San Joaquin Valley water system is the series of aqueducts and pumping plants that take water from the Sacramento-San Joaquin Delta and send it southwards to supply farms and cities. The Delta Cross Channel intercepts Sacramento River water as it travels westwards towards Suisun Bay and diverts it south through a series of man-made channels, the Mokelumne River, and other natural sloughs, marshes and distributaries. From there, the water travels to the C.W. Bill Jones Pumping Plant, which raises water into the Delta-Mendota Canal, which in turn travels 117 miles (188 km) southwards to Mendota Pool on the San Joaquin River, supplying water to other CVP reservoirs about midway. A facility exists at the entrance of the pump plant in order to catch fish that would otherwise end up in the Delta-Mendota Canal. A second canal, the Contra Costa Canal, captures freshwater near the central part of the delta, taking it 48 miles (77 km) southwards, distributing water to the Clayton and Ygnacio Canals in the process, and supplying water to Contra Loma Dam, eventually terminating at Martinez Reservoir.

=== San Joaquin River ===
The CVP also has several dams on the San Joaquin River—which has far less average flow than the Sacramento—in order to divert its water to southern Central Valley aqueducts. The Friant Dam, completed in 1942, is the largest component of the Friant Division of the CVP. The dam crosses the San Joaquin River where it spills out of the Sierra Nevada, forming Millerton Lake, which provides water storage for San Joaquin Valley irrigators as well as providing a diversion point for a pair of canals, the Friant-Kern Canal and the Madera Canal. The Friant-Kern Canal sends water southwards through the Tulare Lake area to its terminus at Bakersfield on the Kern River, supplying irrigation water to Tulare, Fresno, and Kern counties. The Madera Canal takes water northwards to Madera County, emptying into the Chowchilla River. The Central Valley also consisted of 500 miles of canals, providing the city dwellers and power sales from the generation of electricity pay of the project costs.

=== Stanislaus River ===
On the Stanislaus River, a major tributary of the San Joaquin, lies the relatively independent East Side Division and New Melones Unit of the CVP. The sole component of the division/unit is New Melones Dam, forming New Melones Lake, which, when filled to capacity, holds nearly 2,400,000 acre-feet (3,000,000 dam^{3}) of water, about equal to the storage capacity of Trinity Lake. The dam functions to store water during dry periods and release it downstream into the northern San Joaquin Valley according to water demand. The dam generates 279 MW of power with a peaking capacity of 300 MW.

=== Offstream storage and aqueducts ===
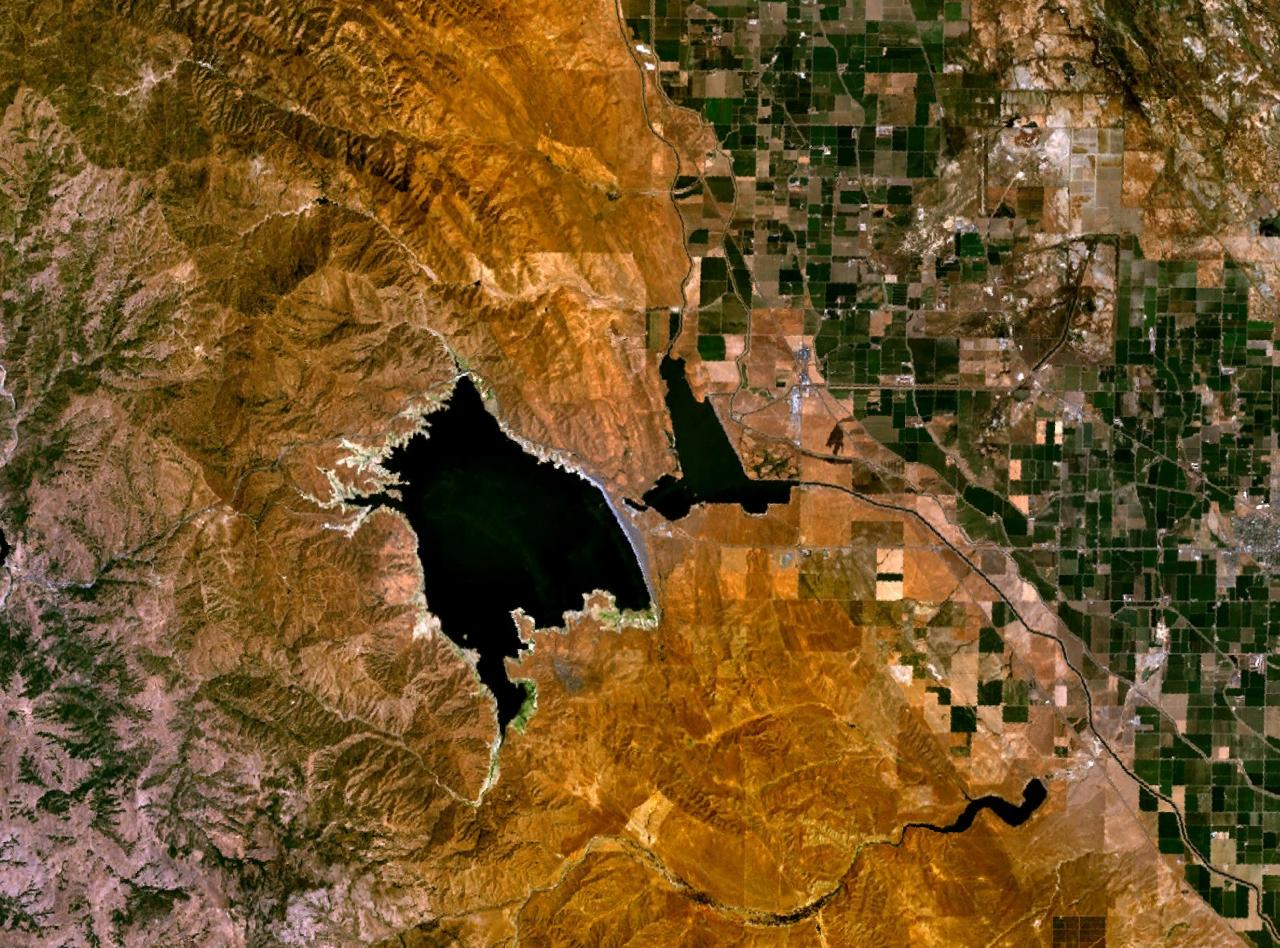
Satellite photo of San Luis Reservoir and O'Neill Forebay

The CVP has a significant amount of facilities for storing and transporting water on the west side of the San Joaquin Valley, in the foothills of the California Coast Ranges. The West San Joaquin Division and San Luis Unit consist of several major facilities that are shared with the federal California State Water Project (SWP). San Luis Dam (or B.F. Sisk Dam) is the largest storage facility, holding 2,000,000 acre-feet (2,500,000 dam^{3}) of water. Although called an offstream storage reservoir by USBR, the reservoir floods part of the San Luis Creek valley. San Luis Creek, however, is not the primary water source for the reservoir. Downstream of San Luis Reservoir is O'Neill Forebay, which is intersected by the Delta-Mendota Canal, a separate CVP facility. Water is pumped from the canal into the Forebay and uphill into San Luis Reservoir, which functions as an additional water source during dry periods.

Water released from San Luis and O'Neill reservoirs feeds into the San Luis Canal, the federally built section of the California Aqueduct, which carries both CVP and SWP water. The San Luis Canal terminates at Kettleman City, where it connects with the state-built section of the California Aqueduct. With a capacity of 13,100 cubic feet per second (370 m^{3}/s), it is one of the largest irrigation canals in the United States. The Coalinga Canal (operated for USBR by the Westlands Water District) branches off the San Luis Canal towards the Coalinga area. A pair of separate dams, Los Baños Detention Dam and Little Panoche Detention Dam, provide flood control in the Los Baños area. The San Luis Drain was a separate project by USBR in an attempt to keep contaminated irrigation drainage water out of the San Joaquin River, emptying into Kesterson Reservoir where the water would evaporate or seep into the ground. Because of environmental concerns, the system was never completed.

The CVP also operates a San Felipe Division to supply water to 63,500 acres (25,700 ha) of land in the Santa Clara Valley west of the Coast Ranges. San Justo Dam stores water diverted from San Luis Reservoir through the Pacheco Tunnel and Hollister Conduit, which travel through the Diablo Range. A separate canal, the Santa Clara Tunnel and Conduit, carries water to the Santa Clara Valley.

== Environmental impacts ==
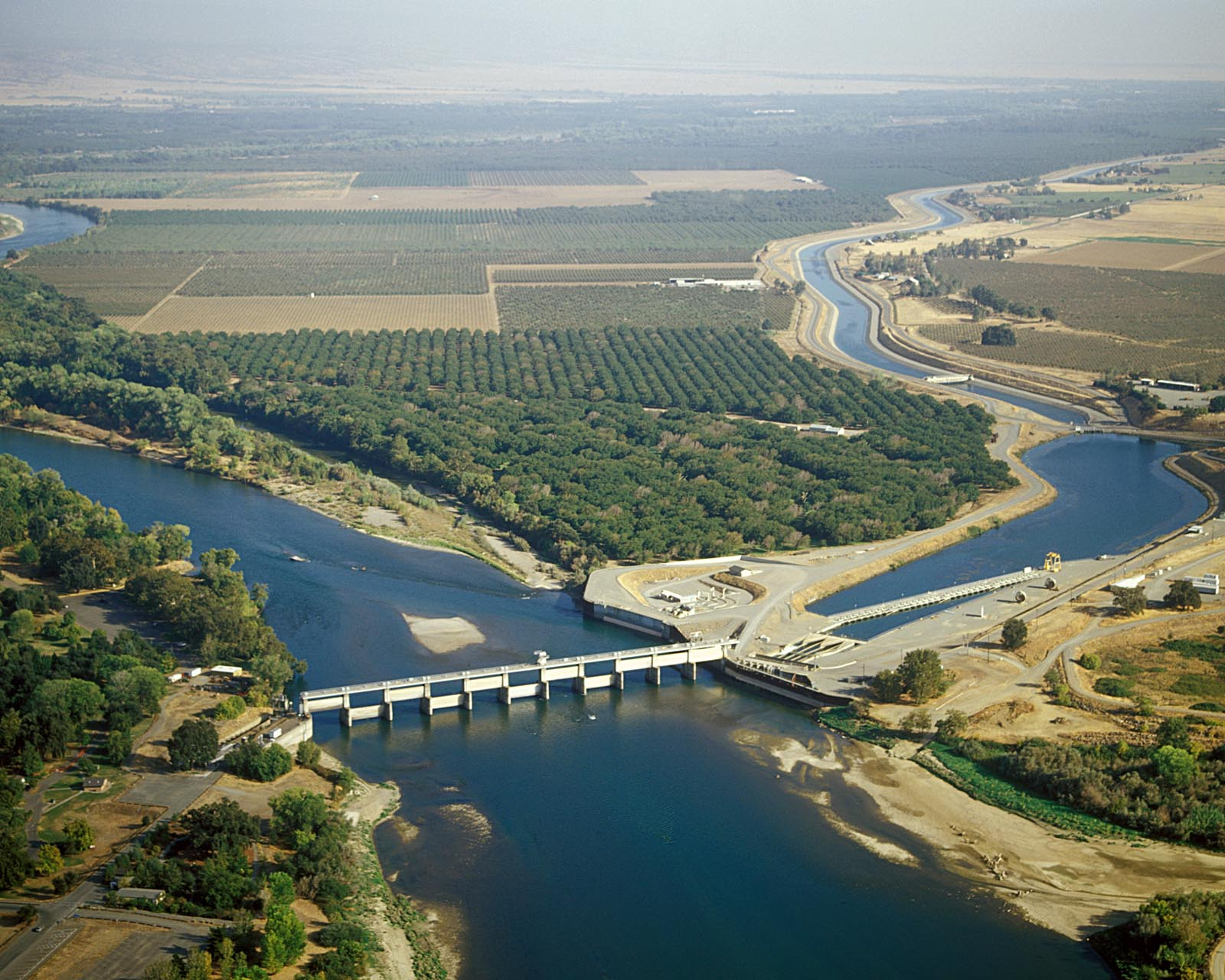
Red Bluff Diversion Dam on the Sacramento River once posed a significant barrier to salmon, steelhead and sturgeon migration. It has since been replaced with a pumping plant to improve fish passage.

Once, profuse runs of anadromous fish—salmon, steelhead, and others—migrated up the Sacramento and San Joaquin Rivers to spawn in great numbers. The construction of CVP dams on the two rivers and many of their major tributaries—namely Friant Dam and Shasta Dam—mostly ended the once-bountiful Central Valley salmon run. From north to south, the Sacramento upriver of Shasta Dam, the American upriver of Folsom Dam, the Stanislaus upriver of New Melones Dam, and the San Joaquin upriver of Mendota—have become inaccessible to migrating salmon. In three of these cases, it is because the dams are too high and their reservoirs too large for fish to bypass via fish ladders. The San Joaquin River, however, had a different fate. Almost 60 mi (97 km) of the river is dry because of diversions from Friant Dam and Millerton Lake. Even downstream of Mendota, where the Delta-Mendota Canal gives the river a new surge of water from the Sacramento-San Joaquin Delta, irrigation runoff water, contaminated with pesticides and fertilizer, has caused the river to become heavily polluted. To make matters worse, efforts by the California Department of Fish and Game to route the San Joaquin salmon run into the Merced River in the 1950s failed, because the salmon did not recognize the Merced as their "home stream".

Not only on the San Joaquin River have CVP facilities wreaked environmental havoc. On the Sacramento River, Red Bluff Diversion Dam in Tehama County, while not as large or as impacting as Friant Dam, was once a barrier to the migration of anadromous fish. The original fish passage facilities of the dam continually experienced problems from the beginning of operation in 1966, and introduced species that prey on young smolt often gather at the base of the dam, which reduced the population of outmigrating juvenile salmon into the Pacific. The Red Bluff Diversion Dam has since been replaced with a fish screen and pumping plant, thus allowing unimpaired passage through Red Bluff. Further upstream, Keswick and Shasta Dams form total barriers to fish migration. Even out of the Central Valley watershed, the CVP's diversion of water from the Trinity River from Lewiston Dam into Whiskeytown Lake has significantly hurt the Klamath River tributary's salmon run. Over three-quarters of the river's flow is diverted through the Clear Creek Tunnel and away from the Trinity River, causing the river below the dam to become warm, silty, shallow and slow-flowing, attributes that hurt young salmon. Furthermore, the Trinity Dam forms a blockade that prevents salmon from reaching about 109 miles (175 km) of upriver spawning grounds. In the early years of the 21st century, the Bureau of Reclamation finally began to steadily increase the water flow downstream from Lewiston Dam. While providing less water for the CVP altogether, the new flow regime allows operations to meet the line drawn by Reclamation itself in 1952 stating that at least 48% of the river's natural flow must be left untouched in order for Trinity River salmon to survive. The lack of flow in the Trinity up to then was also a violation of the authorization that Congress made over the operation of the dam. The "...legislation required that enough be left in the Trinity for in-basin needs, including preservation of the salmon fishery."

In the early years of the 21st century, the Bureau of Reclamation studied the feasibility of raising Shasta Dam. One of the proposed heights was 18.5 feet (5.6 m) greater than its current size, thus increasing the storage capacity of Shasta Lake by 636,000 acre-feet (784,000 dam^{3}). The agency also proposed a smaller raise of 6.5 ft (2.0 m) that would add 290,000 acre-feet (360,000 dam^{3}). Previously, a 200 ft (61 m) raise of the dam, increasing storage to 13,890,000 acre-feet (17,130,000 dam^{3}), was considered, but deemed uneconomical. When Shasta Dam was first built, it was actually planned to be two hundred feet higher than it is now, but Reclamation stopped construction at its present height because of a shortage of materials and workers during World War II. The raising of the dam would further regulate and store more Sacramento River water for dry periods, thus benefiting the entire operations of the CVP, and also generating additional power. However, the proposed height increase was fought over for many reasons. Raising the dam would cost several hundred million dollars and raise the price of irrigation water from Shasta Lake. It would drown most of the remaining land belonging to the Winnemem Wintu tribe—90 percent of whose land already lies beneath the surface of the lake—and flood several miles of the McCloud River, protected under National Wild and Scenic River status. Buildings, bridges, roads and other structures would have to be relocated. The added capacity of the reservoir would change flow fluctuations in the lower Sacramento River, and native fish populations, especially salmon, would suffer with the subsequent changes to the ecology of the river.

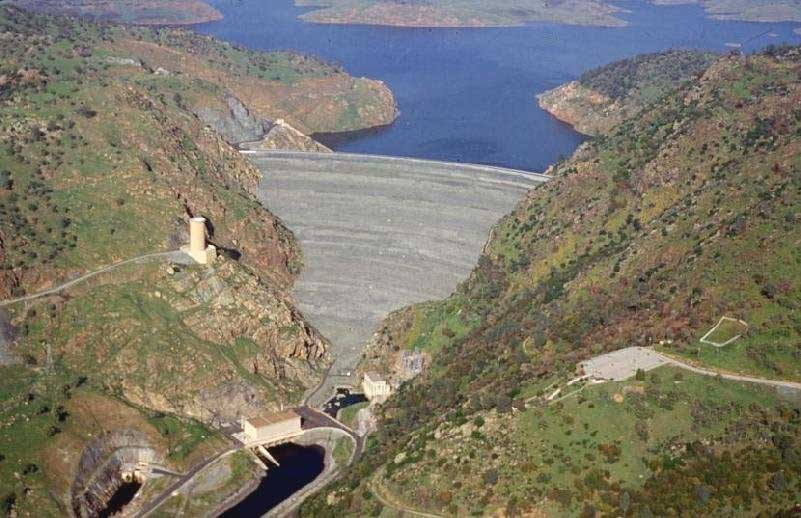
New Melones Dam, seen here with New Melones Lake beyond, is one of the most disputed operations of the CVP

New Melones Dam has come under even greater controversy than Shasta Dam, mainly because of the project's conflicts with federal and state limits and its impact on the watershed of the Stanislaus River. The original Melones Dam, submerged underneath New Melones Lake (hence the name New Melones Dam) is the source of one of these problems. The disused Melones Dam blocks cold water at the bottom of the lake from reaching the river, especially in dry years when the surface of the lake is closer to the crest of the old dam. This results in the river below the dam attaining a much higher temperature than usual, hurting native fish and wildlife. To solve this problem, Reclamation shuts off operations of the dam's hydroelectric power plant when water levels are drastically low, but this results in power shortages. Originally, after the dam was constructed, the State of California put filling the reservoir on hold because of enormous public opposition to what was being inundated: the limestone canyon behind the dam, the deepest of its kind in the United States, contained hundreds of archaeological and historic sites and one of California's best and most popular whitewater rafting runs. Thus the reservoir extended only to Parrot's Ferry Bridge, 9 mi (14 km) below its maximum upriver limit, until the El Niño event of 1982–1983, which filled it to capacity within weeks and even forced Reclamation to open the emergency spillways, prompting the state and federal governments to repeal the limits they had imposed on the reservoir. Furthermore, the project allows a far smaller sustainable water yield than originally expected, and Reclamation calls the dam "a case study of all that can go wrong with a project".

In response to these environmental problems, Congress passed in 1992 the Central Valley Project Improvement Act (CVPIA), Title 34 of Public Law 102-575, to change water management practices in the CVP in order to lessen the ecological impact on the San Joaquin and Sacramento Rivers. Actions mandated included the release of more water to supply rivers and wetlands, funding for habitat restoration work (especially for anadromous fish spawning gravels), water temperature control, water conservation, fish passage, increasing the service area of the CVP's canals, and other items. Despite the preservation of river programs, the state legislature continued to have the power to construct dams.

== Gallery ==
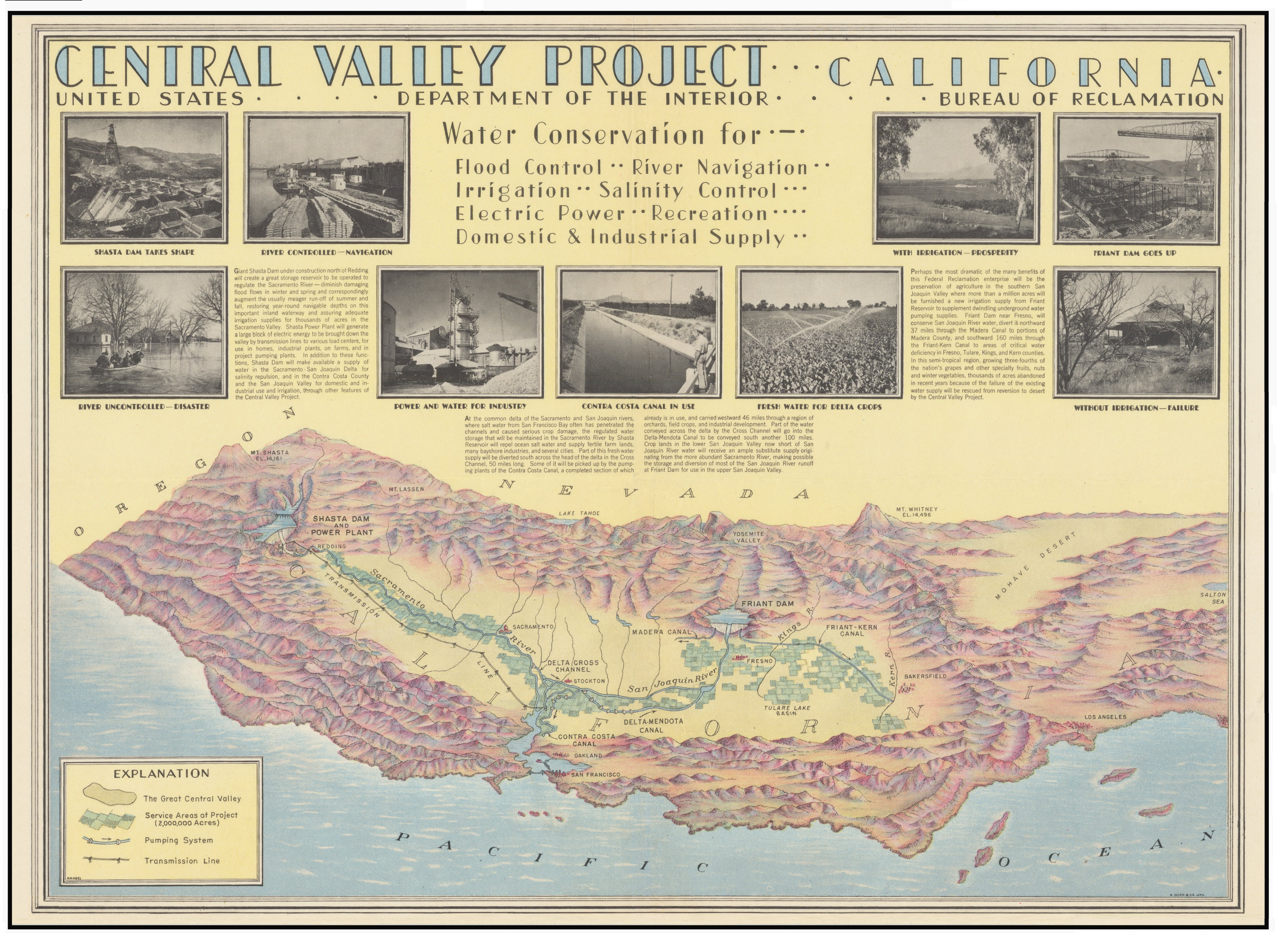
US Department of Interior Bureau of Reclamation - Central Valley Project Map 1938

CVP Chinook Map

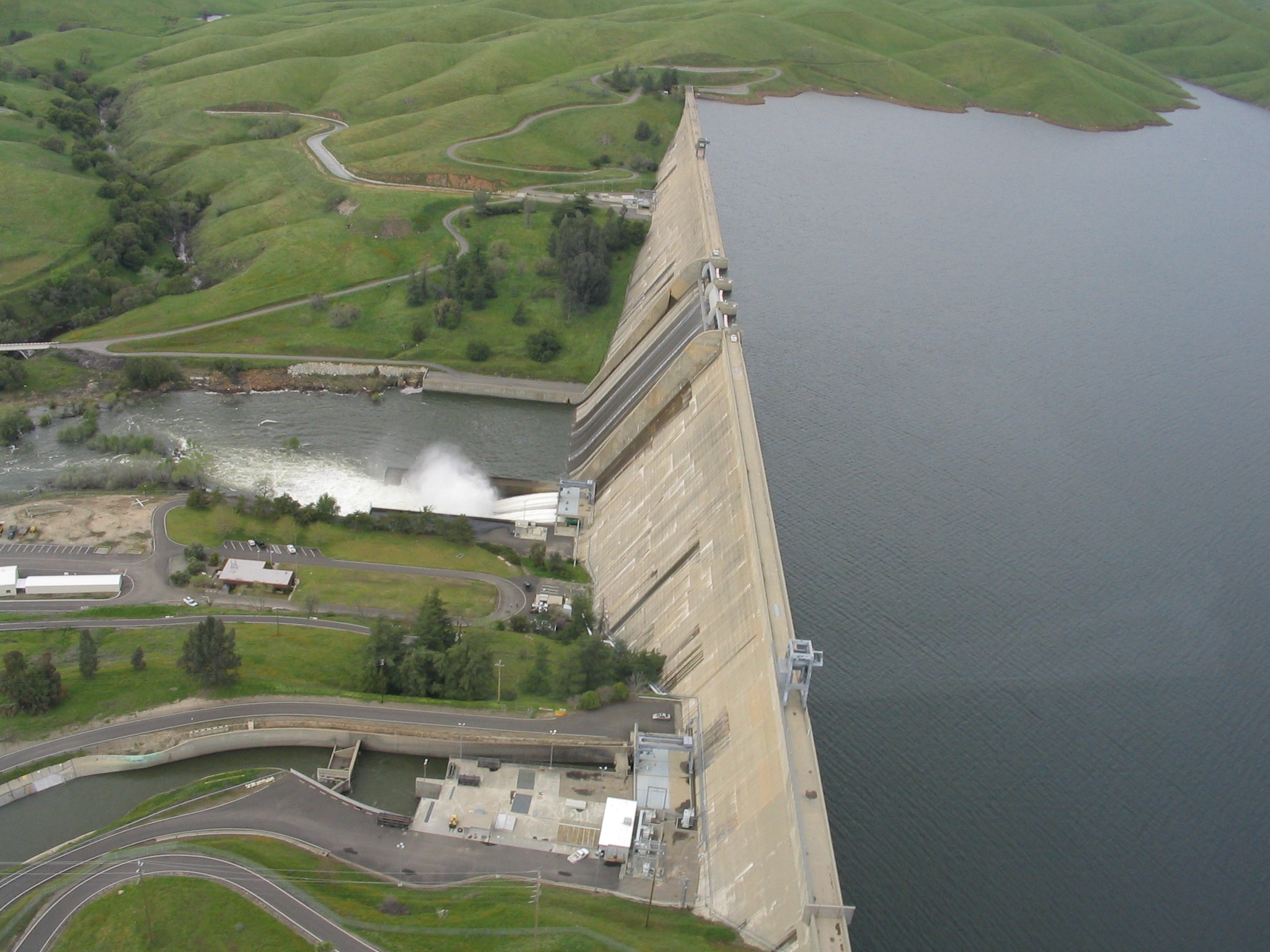
Friant Dam - NOAA Photo Library

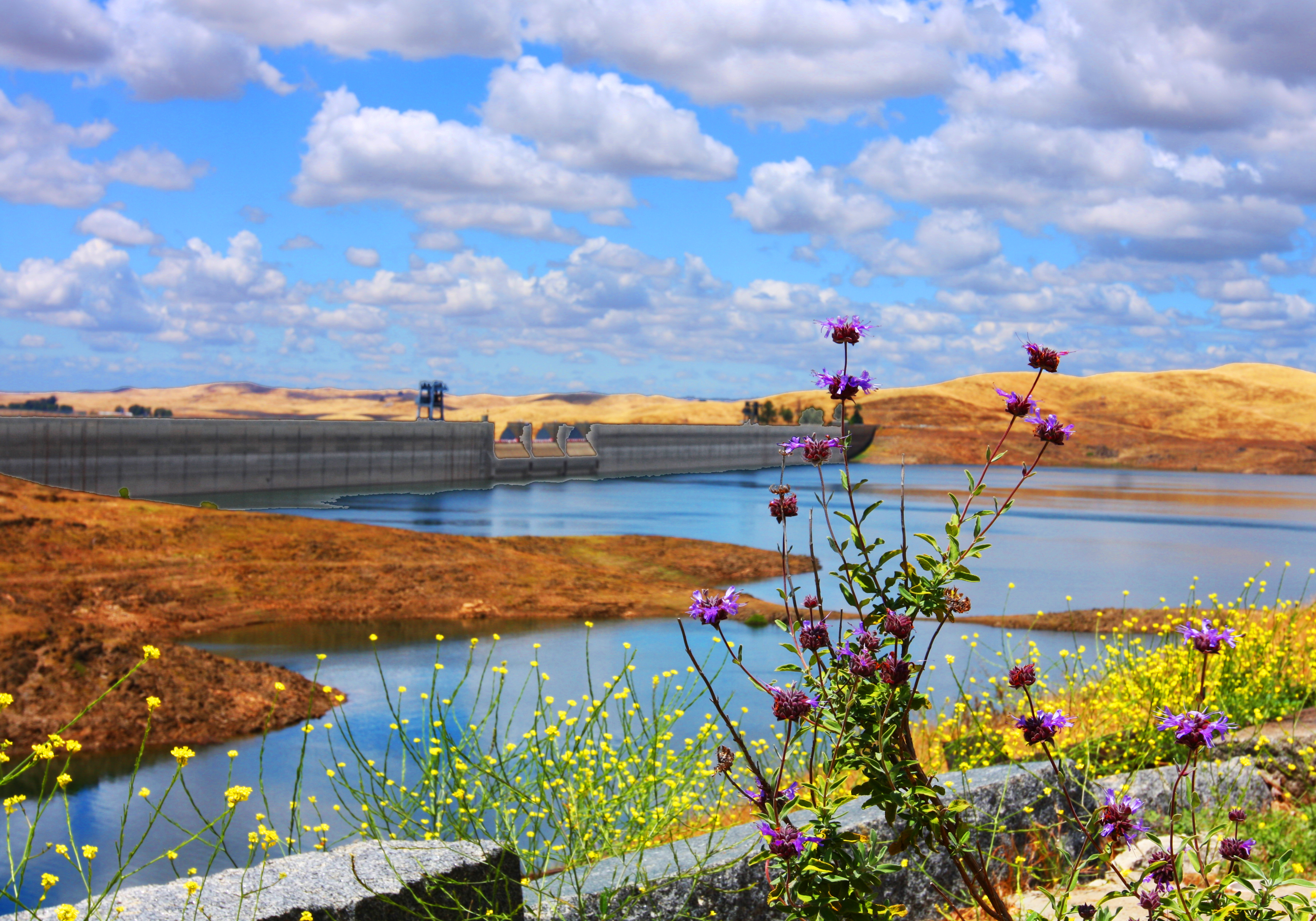
Friant Dam & Milerton Lake

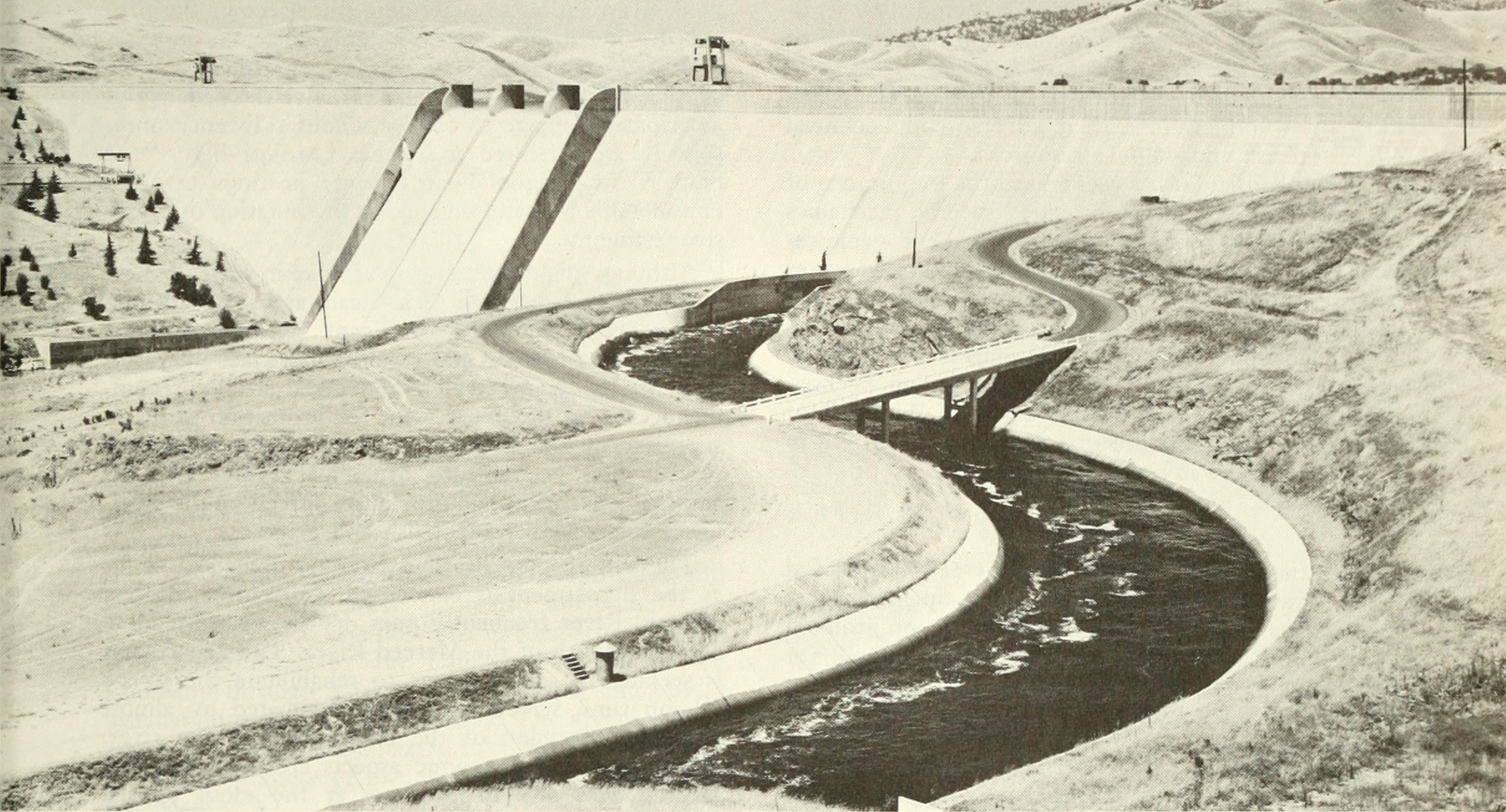
Friant Dam

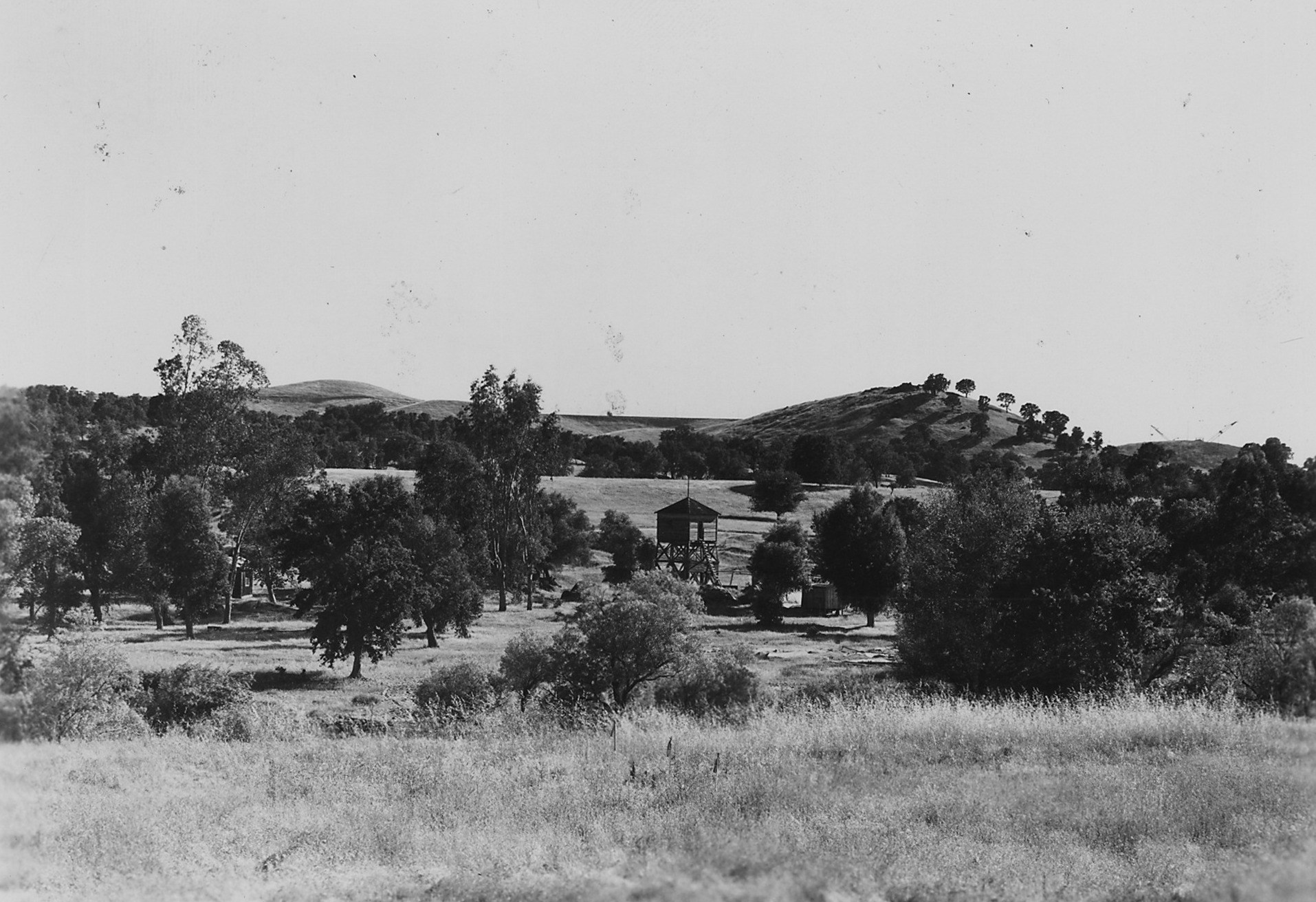
Photograph "Indian Graveyard No. 1," from report "History of Indians Buried in Friant Dam Reservoir Area (California)... - NARA - 296229 (cropped)

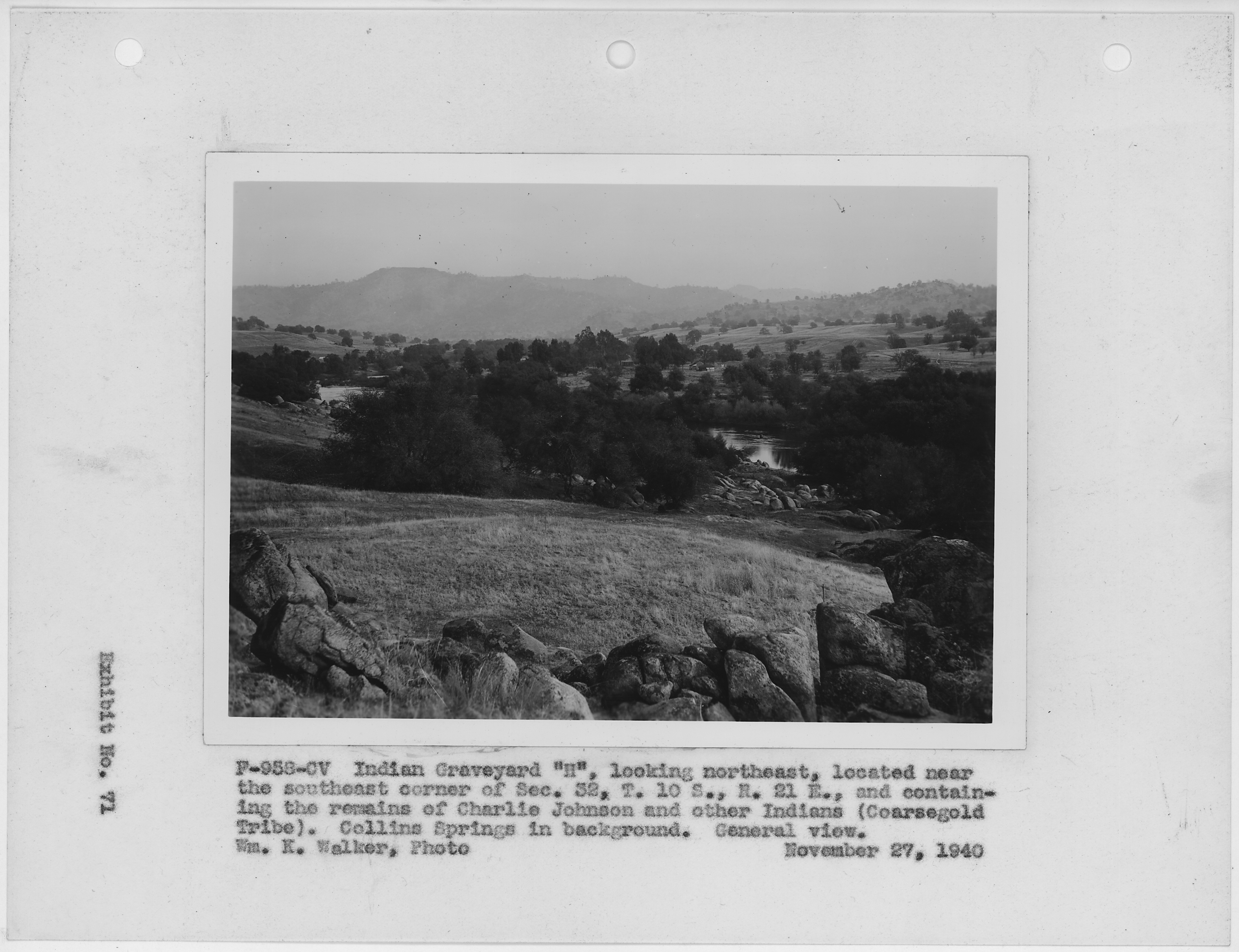
Photograph "Indian Graveyard 'H'...containing the remains of Charlie Johnson and other Indians (Coarsegold Tribe),"... - NARA - 296227

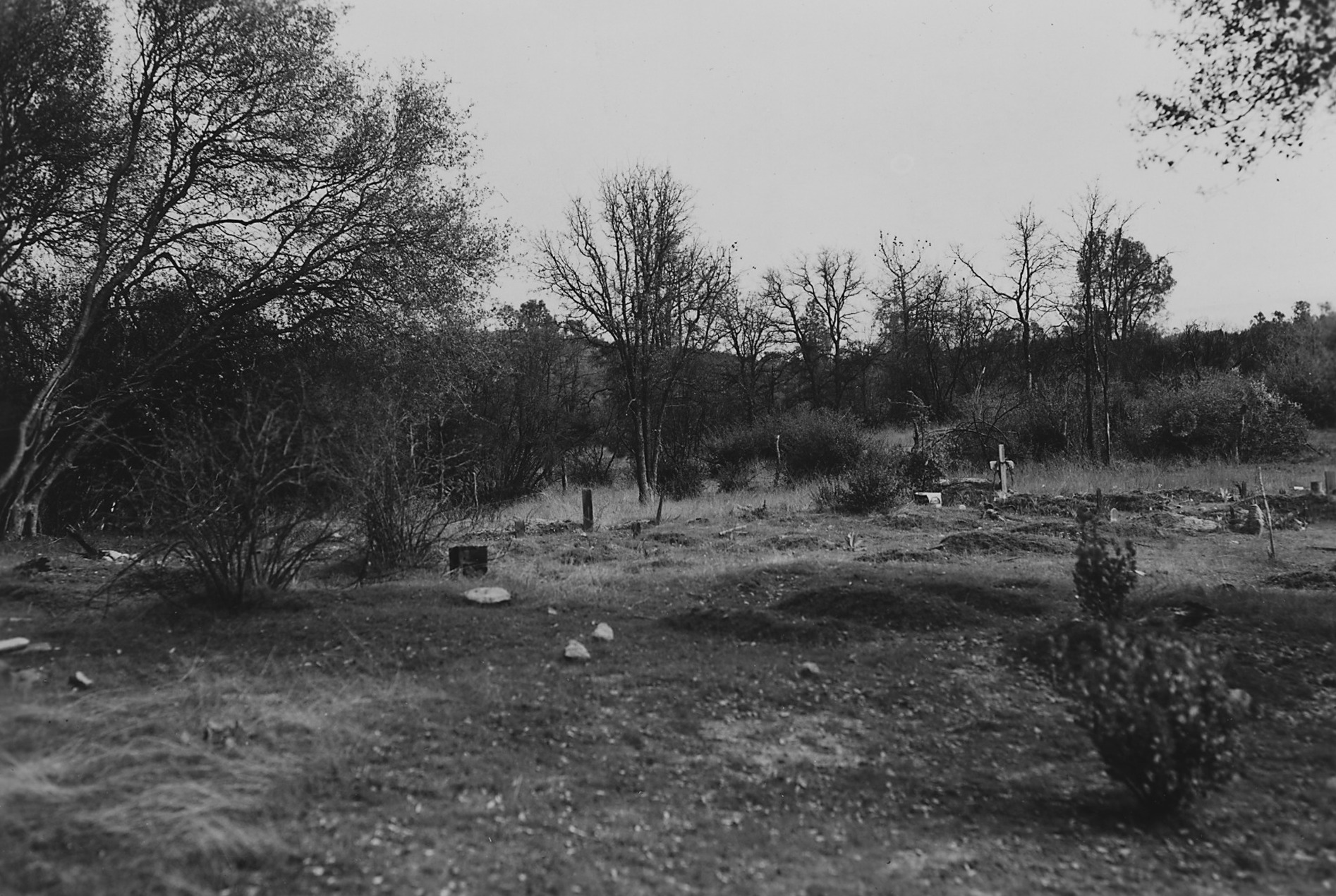
Photograph "View looking southeast of Picciune Indian Cemetery," from report "History of Indians Buried in Friant Dam... - NARA - 296228 (cropped)

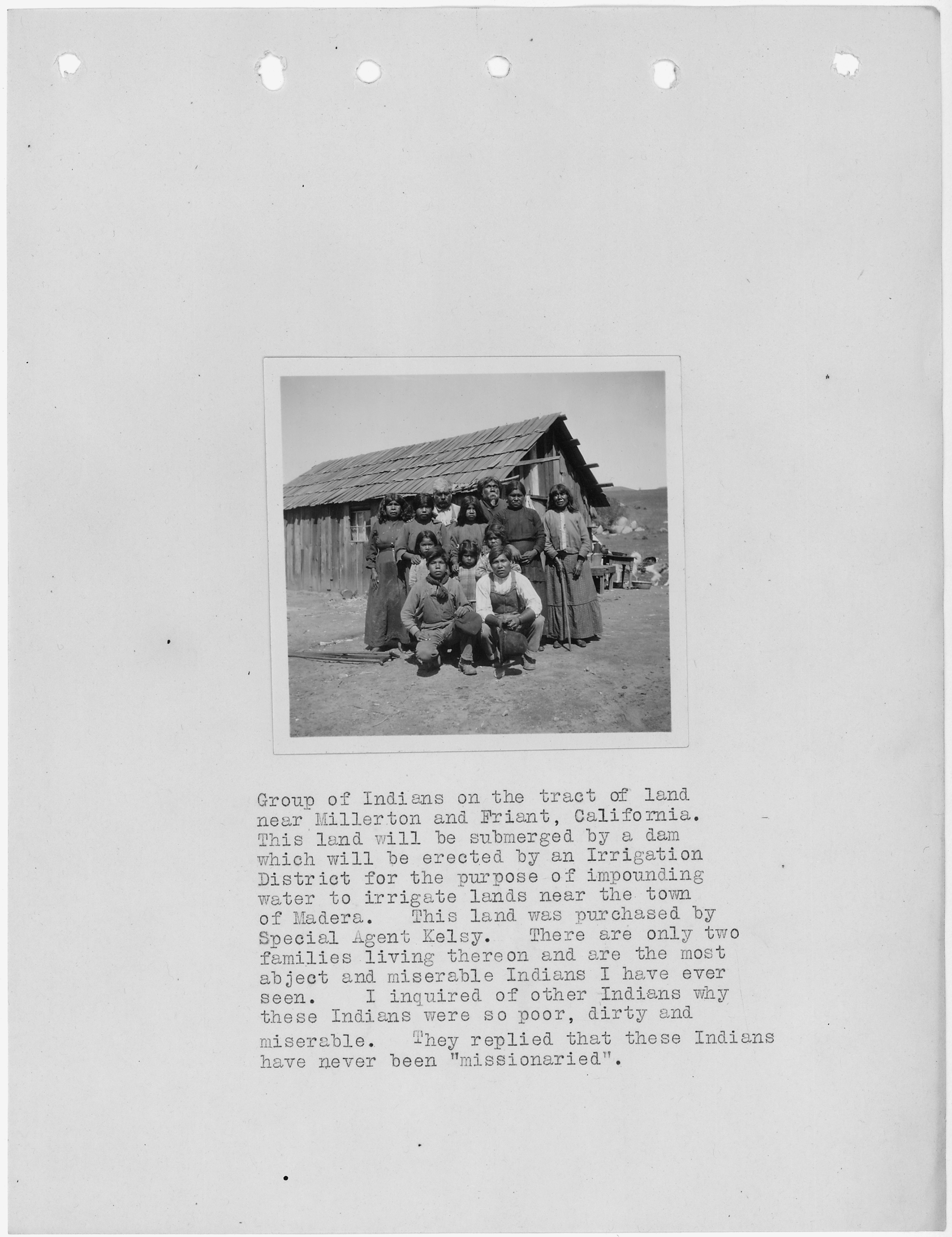
Photograph with text of group of Native Americans on land that will be submerged by a dam near Millerton and Friant... - NARA - 296302

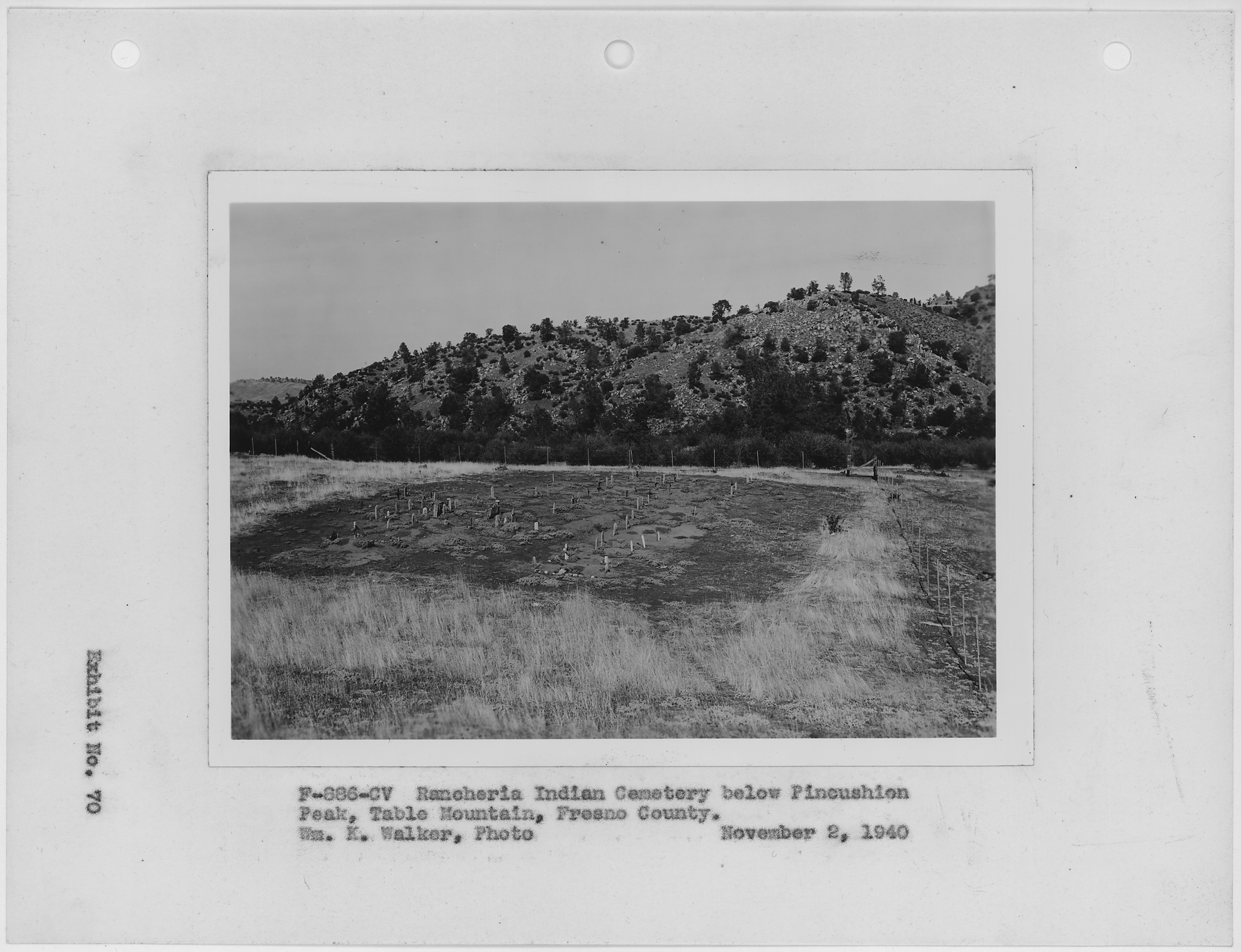
Photograph "Rancheria Indian Cemetery below Pincushion Peak, Table Mountain, Fresno County," from report "History of... - NARA - 296225

== See also ==
- Cadillac Desert (book)
- Cadillac Desert (film)
- CALFED Bay-Delta Program
- California Department of Water Resources
- California Reclamation Districts
- California State Water Project
- California Water Wars
- Droughts in California
- Environment of California
- Environmental issues in Fresno, California
- Rivers and Harbors Act
- Sacramento–San Joaquin River Delta
- San Joaquin River
- Water in California
