= Water Commission Act of 1913 =

The California Water Commission Act of 1913 was the first attempt by the legislature of the state of California to address water rights in a comprehensive manner. The Act was necessitated by the complicated landscape of competing water rights doctrines, demands for reclamation and irrigation, and tension between large landowners and smaller farmers all in the context of California's unique climate and topography. The State Water Commission created by the Act was given the responsibility of permitting and licensing water appropriators post-1914, but had no authority over pre-1914 claims. Ultimately the Act improved the recording of water rights but was inadequate to supervise the distribution of water and left many unresolved issues.

== Challenges to water availability in California ==
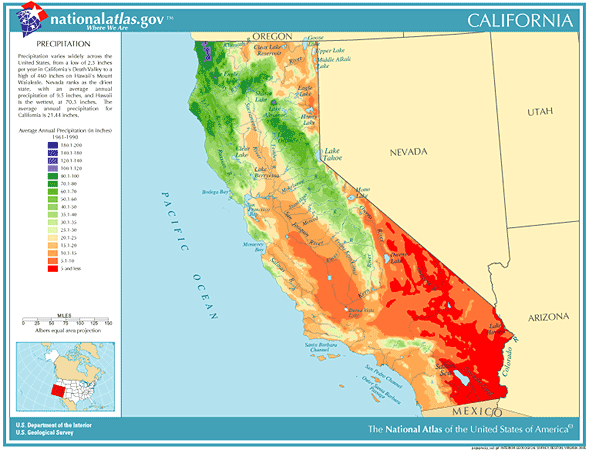
Most precipitation in California falls north of the Transverse Ranges, creating a spatial discontinuity in water availability.

Though much of the state receives ample precipitation, there are several important spatial and temporal issues complicating the distribution of water. Due to the state's predominantly Mediterranean climate regime, precipitation is nearly entirely confined to the months between October and April, meaning that water sources can be intermittent from year to year. Furthermore the extremely fertile agricultural regions of the San Joaquin Valley and Southern California receive relatively little precipitation, while the coastal urban nexuses of Los Angeles and San Francisco receive adequate precipitation but lack storage capacity. Finally, the broad floodplains of the Sacramento and San Joaquin rivers require extensive hydrological engineering in order to be converted to agricultural land and to prevent flooding. In this environment clarity of water rights and fairness in distribution are essential, but competing rights doctrines and a system of adjudication based entirely on litigation defeated attempts to formally codify water rights.

=== Gold Rush, statehood, and competing water doctrines ===
The discovery of gold by John Marshall at Sutter's Mill and the annexation of the California territory by the United States prompted a mass migration to the region. The new settlers brought with them Old World and East Coast attitudes toward water, but the realities of gold extraction in the Mother Lode region required a different standard. The result was the emergence of the riparian water right, derived from English common law, and the right of first appropriation, derived from the frontier ethic of "first in time, first in right." Both doctrines were upheld at various times by the state legislature and court, creating a situation in which competing water claims could only appeal to the courts for resolution.

=== Riparian rights, appropriative rights, and the California doctrine ===
Adapted from English common law, the riparian water right dictated that landholders bordering on or encompassing streams had the reasonable use of the water that flowed over their property. This water right was well adapted to temperate climates with year-round rainfall, but proved ill-fitting for California's more arid climate. This standard brought riparian rights-holders into conflict in low-water years, creating issues of both priority and quantity which could only be settled in court. Furthermore the riparian right allowed for the monopolization of water rights by buying all the land adjacent to a stream, creating a conflict between large landholders with the means to buy up stream-adjacent land, and those who needed water rights in order to run profitable farms.

The appropriative right, on the other hand, was an ad hoc invention of miners in the Mother Lode region, adapted specifically to the realities of gold extraction. The organizing principle of "first in time, first in right" served miners whose gold claims could be miles or tens of miles from running water, while the organization of miners' courts provided a mechanism to settle disputes. Under the appropriative right, entitlement to water proceeded from its actual use, as opposed to the riparian right in which water rights are retained regardless of use, and could be sold or transferred.

The California Doctrine of water law, established in the California Supreme Court ruling over Lux v. Haggin attempted to blend the two doctrines by endorsing the riparian right as the law of the land, but outlining the circumstances under which the appropriative right could be held as superior. Under Lux v. Haggin, all private lands as well as public lands upon transfer to private ownership held riparian rights, but first priority could be given to an appropriator if the appropriative right had been established before riparian rights.

=== Prior legislation ===
The legislature of California made several attempts in the second half of the 19th century to address issues related to reclamation, flooding, and the equitable distribution of newly privatized land. Major legislation of the period included the Reclamation of Swampland Act of 1861, the Green Act of 1868, and the Wright Act of 1887. While these three acts represented different methods of dealing with California's particular water woes, they all proved inadequate.

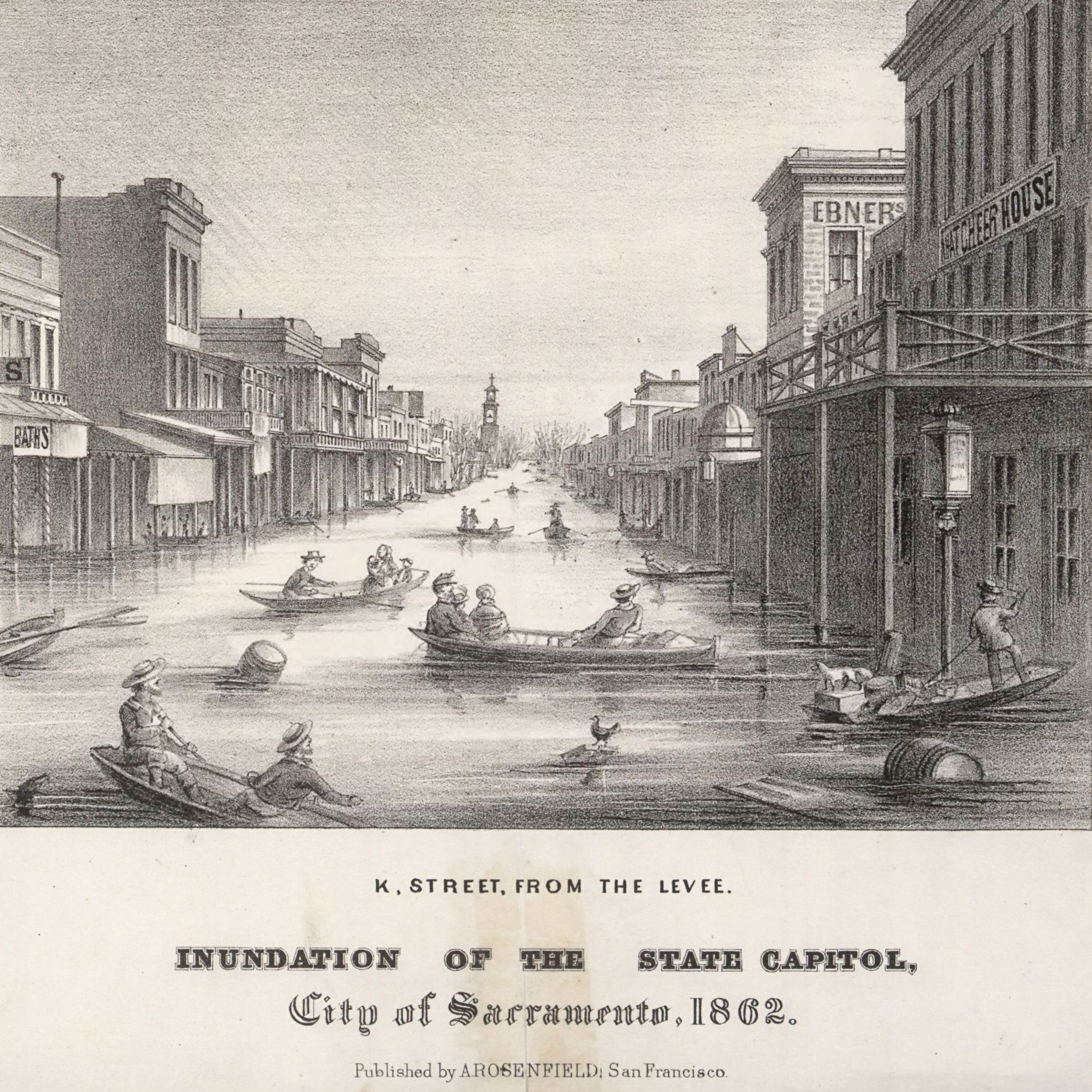
Insufficient flood control was one of many major issues with water management in California, leading to the flooding of the state's capital in 1862.

The Reclamation of Swampland Act of 1861 was the first attempt to address issues of flooding and reclamation by creating a centralized plan to drain and convert the Central Valley into agricultural land. To accomplish this the Act created the state's first independent agency in the Board of Swampland Commissioners, whose job was to design and administer a valley-wide flood plan, and authorized the creation of swampland districts. Lacking a complete understanding of the task they were undertaking however, the engineers failed to erect adequate levee systems and saw what work had been accomplished washed away by floodwaters. This failed experiment in top-down regulation reinforced public attitudes favoring laissez faire principles of management.

The Green Act of 1868 embodied this newfound commitment to hands-off governance. The Act allowed private enterprise to purchase tracts and erect levees or drainage without consultation with any governmental body and also removed all restriction on the amount of land which could be purchased at one time while the price of swamp land at $1 per acre. While the legislature hoped that the Act would encourage creation of small, irrigated farms, the actual result was to concentrate land in the hands of a few individuals, with a legislative investigation revealing a list of 30 individuals having acquired nearly a quarter of the state's two million acres of swamp land.

The Wright Act of 1887 attempted to put the balance of power back into the hands of small landholders by organizing self-governing irrigation districts. These irrigation districts were intended to act as a special government controlled by the community and having the power to break up large landholdings. The legislation had some measurable effect on average farm size, reflecting some limited breakup of large estates, but at the turn of the century 62% of agricultural land was covered in ownerships exceeding 1,000 acres. Ultimately irrigation districts were inadequate to effectively administer land and water rights because they relied on costly litigation to settle disputes. This along with a panoply of other shortcomings resulted in the Wright Act being viewed by California citizens as a failure.

== Water Commission Act ==
Though the period following the passage of the Wright Act did coincide with a vast expansion of irrigated land in the Central Valley it was inadequate to significantly curb the threat of flooding, break up land monopolies, or address the growing concern of municipal water supplies. These issues would become a cornerstone of the platform of Progressive gubernatorial candidate Hiram Johnson who proposed a new water code to protect municipal water supplies and create a state water commission with the primary objective of ending litigation over water claims. To this end the Water Commission Act was submitted to the voters via referendum and approved in 1914. The Act invested in the newly created State Water Commission the power to adjudicate disputes and issue permits for new appropriations of water. Concurrently, issues relating to reclamation and the construction of water infrastructure devolved to the newly formed Board of Reclamation and the Army Corps of Engineers.

=== Shortcomings of the Water Commission ===
The Water Commission Act was immediately attacked by water and power companies on the basis that it would impede enterprise and create a "political" commission. Court challenges as well as insufficient funding and authority hamstrung the Commission. Furthermore the Water Commission was fundamentally hobbled in its inability to adjudicate water rights prior to 1914, as the agency was only invested with the ability to permit appropriators after 1914, leaving the vast majority of water rights conflicts unresolved. Reports issued once every two years by the Commission highlighted issues faced by the agency related to lack of clarity in the procedures for statutory adjudication and lack of power to supervise distribution of water. In 1921, the State Water Commission ceased existence with most of its duties devolving to the newly formed Division of Water Rights of the Department of Public Works.
