= Wright Act of 1887 =

California irrigation law

The Wright Act of 1887 is a state law of California passed by the legislature on March 7, 1887, that allowed farming regions to form and bond irrigation districts which allowed small farm owners to band together, pool resources, and get water to where it was needed. In the state of California, this Act enabled the diverting of waters from the Merced, San Joaquin and Kings rivers in California's Central Valley. California made an amendment to the Wright Act in 1897, which stopped new irrigation districts from being formed. The Irrigation District Bond Certification Commission, which was created in 1913, is now responsible for forming new irrigation districts.

These irrigation districts are public entities. Irrigation canals in California's Central Valley, along with the expansion and creation of railroads, helped farmers to mass-produce and transport agriculture nationwide.

== See also ==
California Department of Water Resources
