= Red Bluff Diversion Dam =

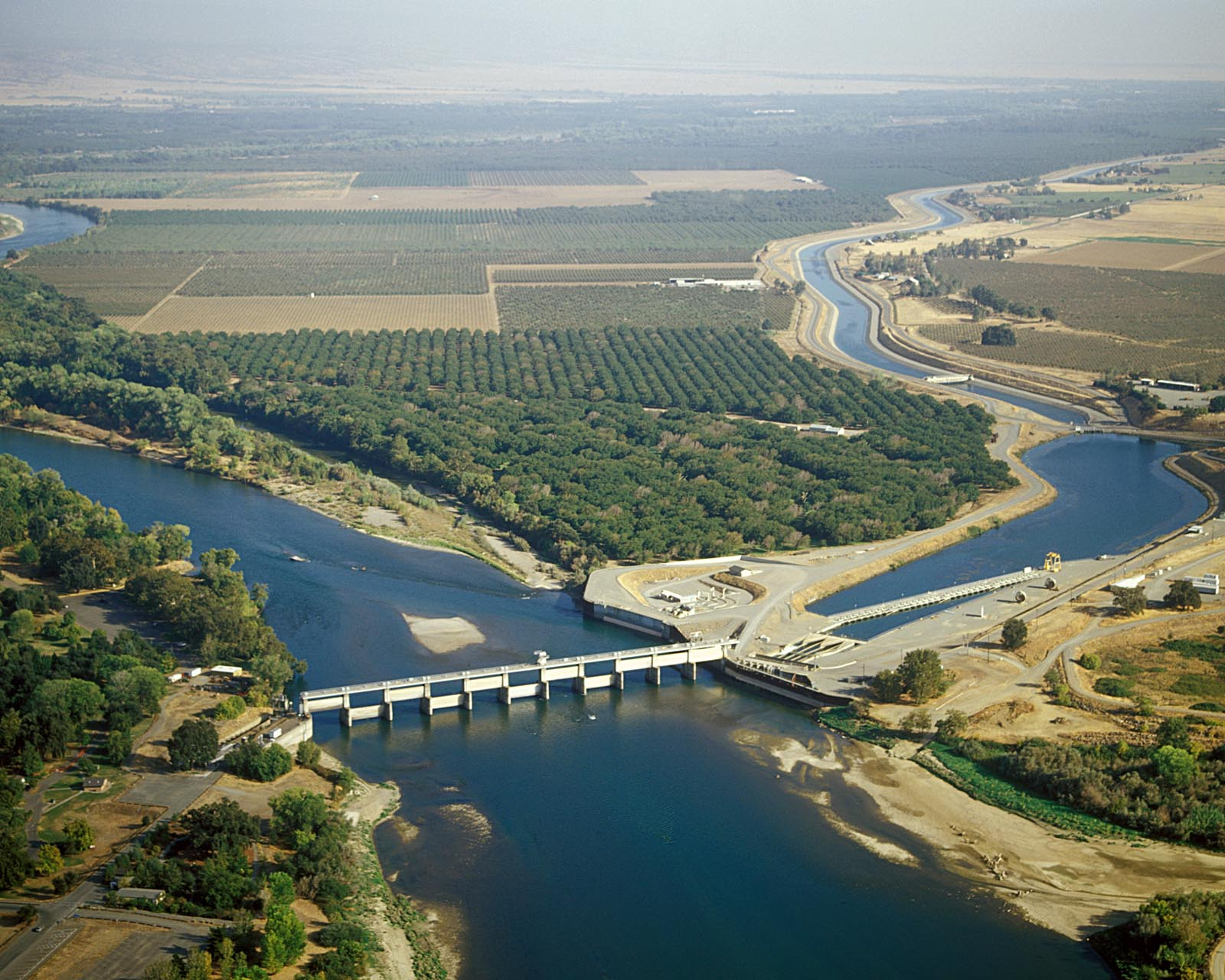
- Aerial view looking downstream, dam gates partially open. Diversion works and Tehama Colusa Canal are to the right.
- Interactive map of Red Bluff Diversion Dam
- Country: United States
- Location: Tehama County, California
- Coordinates: 40°09′13″N 122°12′09″W
- Purpose: Irrigation
- Status: Decommissioned
- Construction began: 1962
- Opening date: 1964
- Construction cost: $3,465,155
- Owner: U.S. Bureau of Reclamation

Dam and spillways
- Type of dam: Concrete gravity
- Impounds: Sacramento River
- Height (foundation): 52 ft (16 m)
- Length: 5,985 ft (1,824 m)
- Elevation at crest: 256 ft (78 m)
- Dam volume: 9,630 yd^{3} (7,360 m^{3})

Reservoir
- Creates: Lake Red Bluff
- Total capacity: 4,170 acre⋅ft (5,140,000 m^{3})
- Catchment area: 8,900 mi^{2} (23,000 km^{2})

Red Bluff Diversion Dam is a disused irrigation diversion dam on the Sacramento River in Tehama County, California, United States, southeast of the city of Red Bluff. Until 2013, the dam provided irrigation water for two canals that serve 150,000 acres (61,000 ha) of farmland on the west side of the Sacramento Valley. The dam and canals are part of the Sacramento Canals Unit of the Central Valley Project, operated by the U.S. Bureau of Reclamation. In 2013, the dam was decommissioned and the river allowed to flow freely through the site in order to protect migrating fish. A pumping plant constructed a short distance upstream now supplies water to the canal system.

== Specifications ==
The dam is a concrete gated weir design, 5,985 feet (1,824 m) long, with a structural height of 52 feet (16 m). Eleven fixed wheel gates, each 60 feet (18 m) wide and 18 feet (5.5 m) high, control the outflow of water to the Sacramento River. The concrete piers between the gates are 8 feet (2.4 m) in width. The entire structure contains about 9,600 cubic yards (7,300 m^{3}) of concrete. Lake Red Bluff, formed by the dam when the gates are lowered, had a maximum depth of 13 feet (4.0 m), a normal storage of 3,920 acre-feet (4,840,000 m^{3}), and a maximum storage of 4,170 acre-feet (5,140,000 m^{3}). The original design of the dam included two fish ladders, one on each end of the dam; a third was added in 1984 in the middle of the dam.

A diversion headworks and settling basin on the south bank of the Sacramento River originally provided a gravity flow of water to two aqueducts, the Tehama-Colusa Canal and Corning Canal. The headworks consist of six 11.5-by-10-foot (3.5 m × 3.0 m) radial gates with a capacity of 3,100 cubic feet per second (88 m^{3}/s). This water is now lifted directly from the Sacramento River via a pumping plant constructed as part of the Red Bluff Fish Passage Improvement Project. The pumping plant has a capacity of 2,000 cubic feet per second (57 m^{3}/s), with potential future expansion to 2,500 cubic feet per second (71 m^{3}/s).

The Tehama Colusa Canal, larger of the two canals, is 110.9 miles (178.5 km) long, with a capacity of 2,530 cubic feet per second (72 m^{3}/s). The Corning Canal is 21 miles (34 km) long and can carry 500 cubic feet per second (14 m^{3}/s). Together, the canals irrigate 150,000 acres (61,000 ha) in Tehama, Glenn, Colusa and Yolo Counties, of which 105,000 acres (42,000 ha) lacked sufficient water before the project was built. Six additional pumping plants are required at various points to maintain water flow in the two canals. Water is also provided to 20,000 acres (8,100 ha) of wildlife preserves in the Sacramento Valley. The total crop value is $250 million, with total benefits of $1 billion per year to the regional economy.

== Construction history ==
Although the Central Valley Project was initially authorized in 1935, the Sacramento Canals Division was not authorized until September 29, 1950 by President Harry Truman. The contract for construction of Red Bluff Diversion Dam was awarded in 1962 to Vinnell Corporation, for a total of $3,465,155. Work on the dam began in 1962 and was completed on August 9, 1964, more than 4 months ahead of schedule. The Corning Canal had been completed by 1959, but the much larger Tehama Colusa Canal was not completed until 1980.

== Environmental impact ==
While the dam is relatively small, it has historically blocked passage of salmon, steelhead and sturgeon runs on the Sacramento River with resulting detrimental impact on these fish populations. This occurred both due to improper construction of the fish ladders on the dam, and turbulence caused by water diversion which disorient migrating fish. A fish screen was installed between 1969 and 1971 to prevent fish from entering the canal headworks, and a new fish ladder was later constructed at a cost of $17 million. Starting in 1987, the dam gates were left open between December 1 and April 1 to help the winter Chinook salmon run. However, this did not have an appreciable impact on fish populations; in 1991, the winter Chinook count hit a record low of 191, down from 118,000 in 1969. The spring Chinook salmon run has not been as severely impacted by dam operations. By 2008, the dam gates were open in all months except for the primary irrigation season of mid-May to mid-September, but the migrating fish count remained low. In 2009, the National Marine Fisheries Service mandated that the dam gates be opened year round, allowing the river to flow freely. A new pumping plant and fish screen was constructed upstream to divert water into the Tehama-Colusa and Corning Canals. These works effectively made the Red Bluff dam obsolete.

In 2013, the Bureau of Reclamation awarded E.C. Smith Inc. a contract of $3.28 million to decommission the dam. While the dam is not planned to be removed, its gates are permanently locked in the open position. The decommissioning has been controversial, as it resulted in the loss of Lake Red Bluff, the reservoir originally formed behind the dam and a popular recreation spot in the area. The total cost of restoring fish populations above Red Bluff Dam has reached about $180 million.

== See also ==
- List of dams and reservoirs in California
- Water in California
