= Sacramento River =

River in Northern and Central California, US

Sacramento River Rio del Santísimo Sacramento
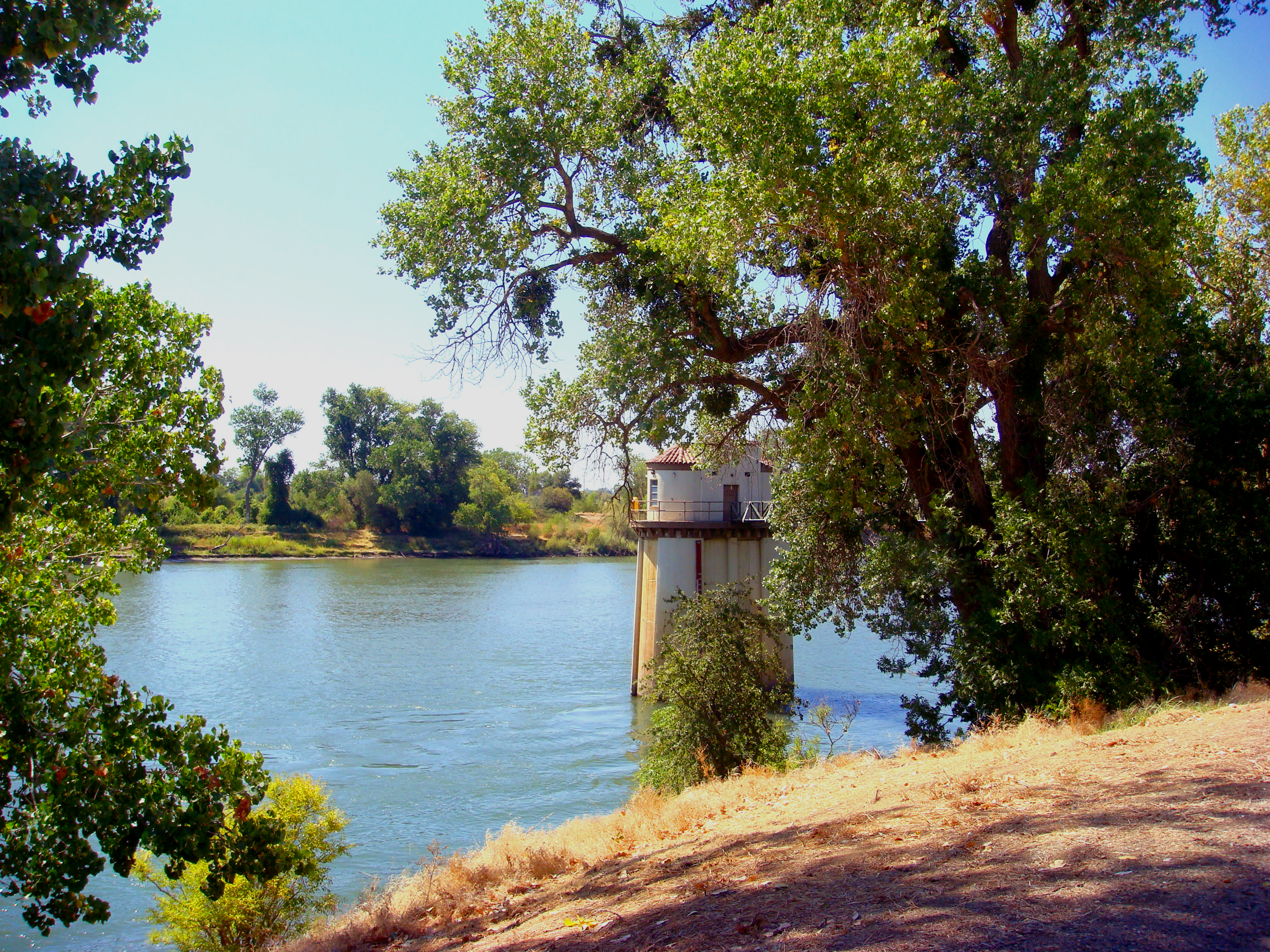
- Sacramento River from the old pumping station in Sacramento, California

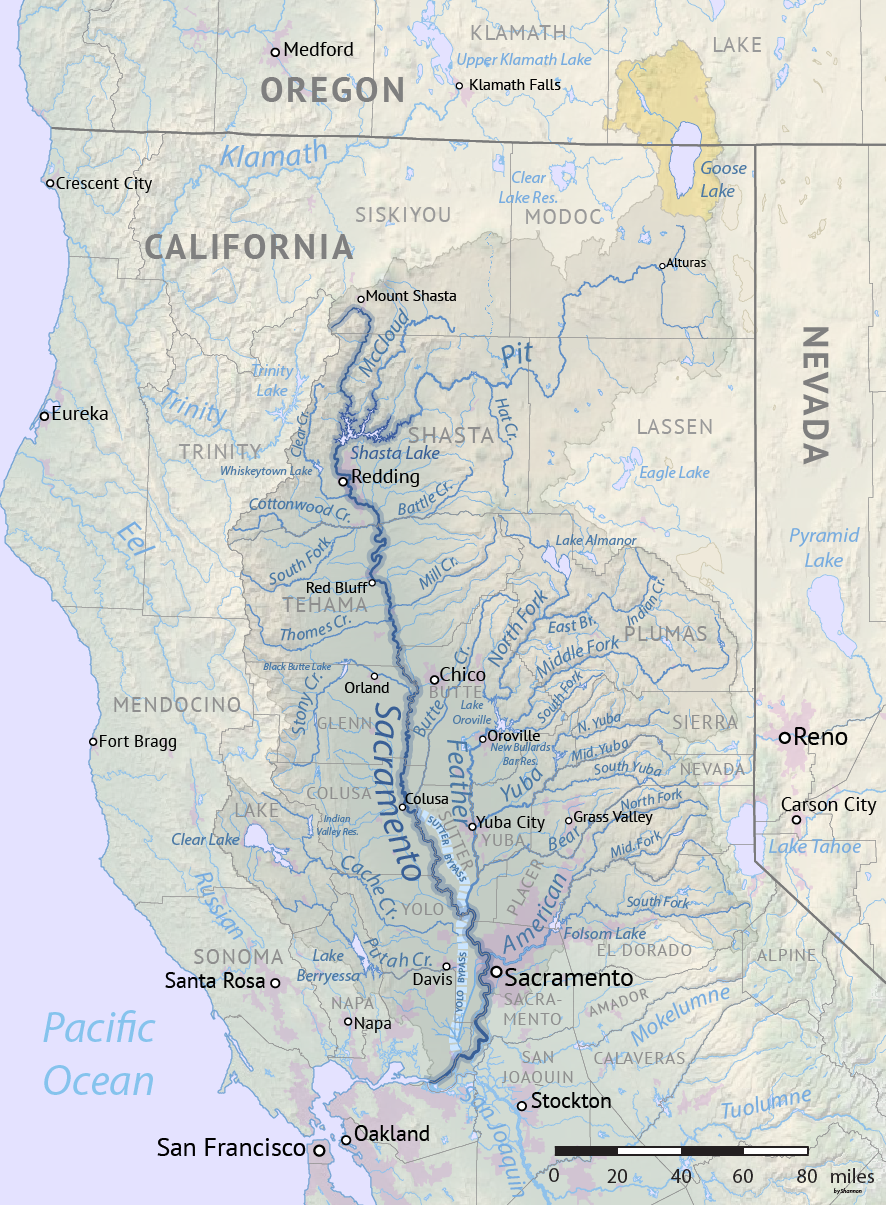
- Map of the Sacramento River watershed
- Native name: Río Sacramento (Spanish)

Location
- Country: United States
- State: California
- Cities: Mount Shasta, Dunsmuir, Redding, Anderson, Red Bluff, Princeton, Colusa, Davis, Sacramento, West Sacramento, Isleton, Rio Vista, Antioch

Physical characteristics
- Source: Confluence of Middle and South Forks
  - location: Near Mount Shasta, Siskiyou County
  - coordinates: 41°16′24″N 122°24′05″W
  - elevation: 3,674 ft (1,120 m)
- Mouth: Suisun Bay
  - location: Contra Costa, Solano, Sacramento County
  - coordinates: 38°03′48″N 121°51′10″W
  - elevation: 0 ft (0 m)
- Length: 400 mi (640 km), North-south
- Basin size: 26,500 sq mi (69,000 km^{2})
- Discharge
  - location: near Sacramento, CA
  - average: 28,139 cu ft/s (796.8 m^{3}/s)
  - minimum: 3,970 cu ft/s (112 m^{3}/s)
  - maximum: 489,000 cu ft/s (13,800 m^{3}/s)

Basin features
- Tributaries
  - left: Pit River, Deer Creek, Butte Creek, Feather River, American River
  - right: Clear Creek, Cottonwood Creek, Stony Creek, Cache Creek, Putah Creek
- Nicknames: Sac River, Nile of the West

The Sacramento River (Spanish: Río Sacramento) is the principal river of Northern California in the United States and is the largest river in California. Rising in the Klamath Mountains, the river flows south for 400 miles (640 km) before reaching the Sacramento–San Joaquin River Delta and San Francisco Bay. The river drains about 26,500 square miles (69,000 km^{2}) in 19 California counties, mostly within the fertile agricultural region bounded by the Coast Ranges and Sierra Nevada known as the Sacramento Valley, but also extending as far as the volcanic plateaus of Northeastern California. Historically, its watershed has reached as far north as south-central Oregon where the now, primarily, endorheic (closed) Goose Lake rarely experiences southerly outflow into the Pit River, the most northerly tributary of the Sacramento.

The Sacramento and its wide natural floodplain were once abundant in fish and other aquatic creatures, notably one of the southernmost large runs of Chinook salmon in North America. For about 12,000 years, humans have depended on the vast natural resources of the watershed, which had one of the densest Native American populations in California. The river has provided a route for trade and travel since ancient times. Hundreds of tribes sharing regional customs and traditions have inhabited the Sacramento Valley, first coming into contact with European explorers in the late 1700s. The Spanish explorer Gabriel Moraga named the river Rio de los Sacramentos in 1808, later shortened and anglicized into Sacramento.

In the 19th century, gold was discovered on a tributary of the Sacramento River, starting the California Gold Rush and an enormous population influx to the state. Overland trails such as the California Trail and Siskiyou Trail guided hundreds of thousands of people to the gold fields. By the late part of the century, mining had ceased to be a major part of the economy, and many immigrants turned to farming and ranching. Many populous communities were established along the Sacramento River, including the state capital of Sacramento. Intensive agriculture and mining contributed to pollution in the Sacramento River, and significant changes to the river's hydrology and environment.

Since the 1950s the watershed has been intensely developed for water supply and the generation of hydroelectric power. Today, large dams impound the river and almost all of its major tributaries. The Sacramento River is used heavily for irrigation and serves much of Central and Southern California through the canals of giant state and federal water projects. While it now provides water to over half of California's population and supports the most productive agricultural area in the nation, these changes have left the Sacramento greatly modified from its natural state and have caused the decline of its once-abundant fisheries.

== Course ==
=== Upper river ===
The Sacramento River originates in the mountains and plateaus of far northern California as three major waterways that flow into Shasta Lake: the Upper Sacramento River, McCloud River and Pit River. The Upper Sacramento begins near Mount Shasta, at the confluence of North, Middle and South Forks in the Trinity Mountains of Siskiyou County. It flows east into a small reservoir, Lake Siskiyou, before turning south. The river flows through a canyon for about 60 miles (97 km), past Dunsmuir and Castella, before emptying into Shasta Lake near Lakehead in Shasta County. The McCloud River rises on the east slope of Mount Shasta and flows south for 77 miles (124 km) through the southern Cascade Range, roughly parallel to the Upper Sacramento, eventually to reach the McCloud Arm of Shasta Lake.

The Pit River, by far the largest of the three, begins in Modoc County in the northeastern corner of California. Draining a vast and remote volcanic highlands area, it flows southwest for nearly 300 miles (480 km) before emptying into Shasta Lake near Montgomery Creek. Goose Lake, straddling the Oregon–California border, occasionally overflows into the Pit River during wet years, although this has not happened since 1881. The Goose Lake watershed is the only part of the Sacramento River basin extending into another state. Unlike most California rivers, the Pit and the McCloud Rivers are predominantly spring-fed, ensuring a large and consistent flow in even the driest of summers. At the lower end of Shasta Lake is Shasta Dam, which impounds the Sacramento River for flood control, irrigation and hydropower generation. Before the construction of Shasta Dam, the McCloud River emptied into the Pit River, which joined the Sacramento near the former mining town of Kennett, submerged when Shasta Lake was filled. The Pit River Bridge, which carries Interstate 5 and the Union Pacific Railroad over the reservoir, is structurally the highest double-decked bridge in the United States (although most of the bridge piers are submerged under Shasta Lake when the reservoir is full). The Upper Sacramento River canyon also provides the route for I-5 and the railroad between Lakehead and Mount Shasta.

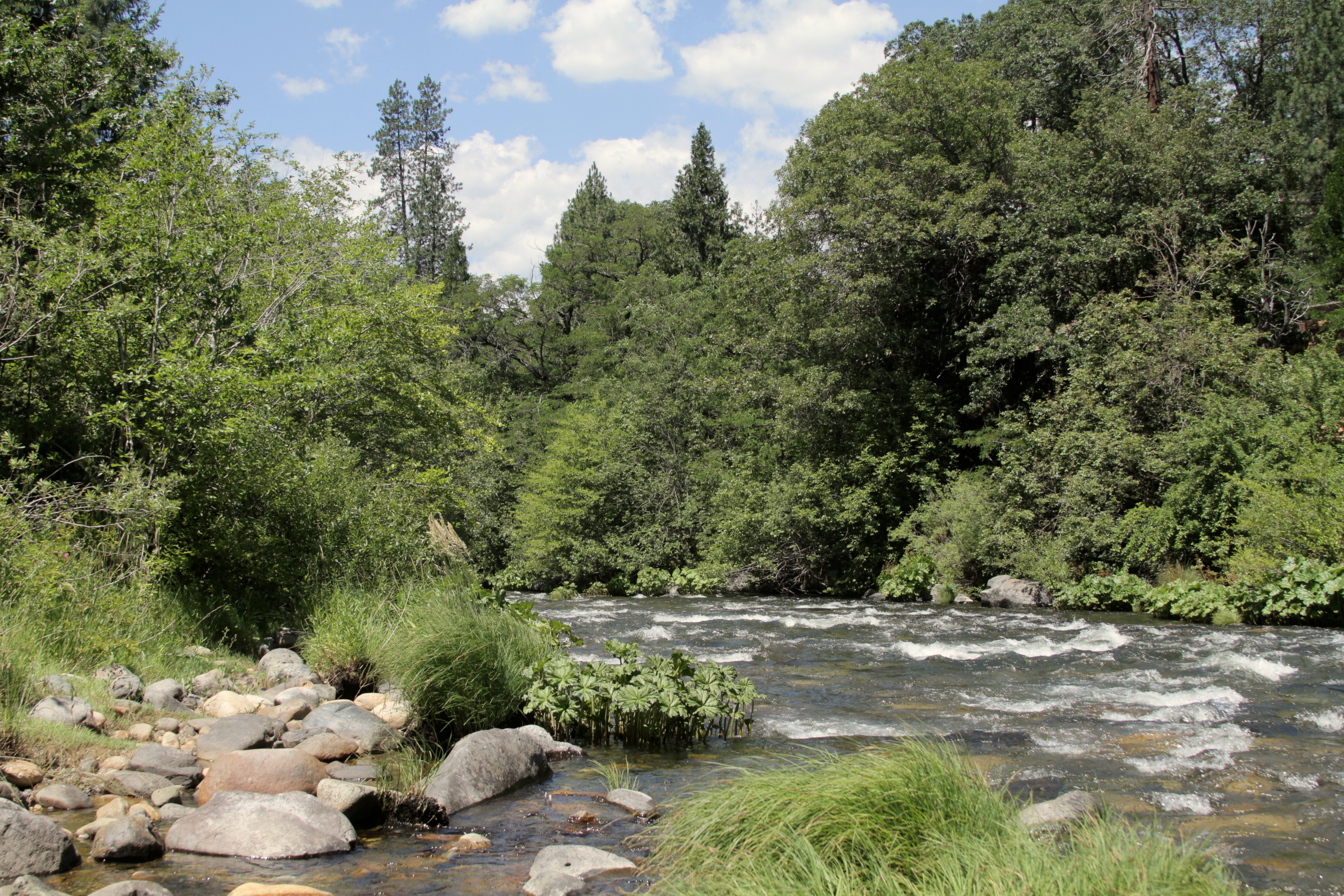
Upper Sacramento River at Castle Crags State Park

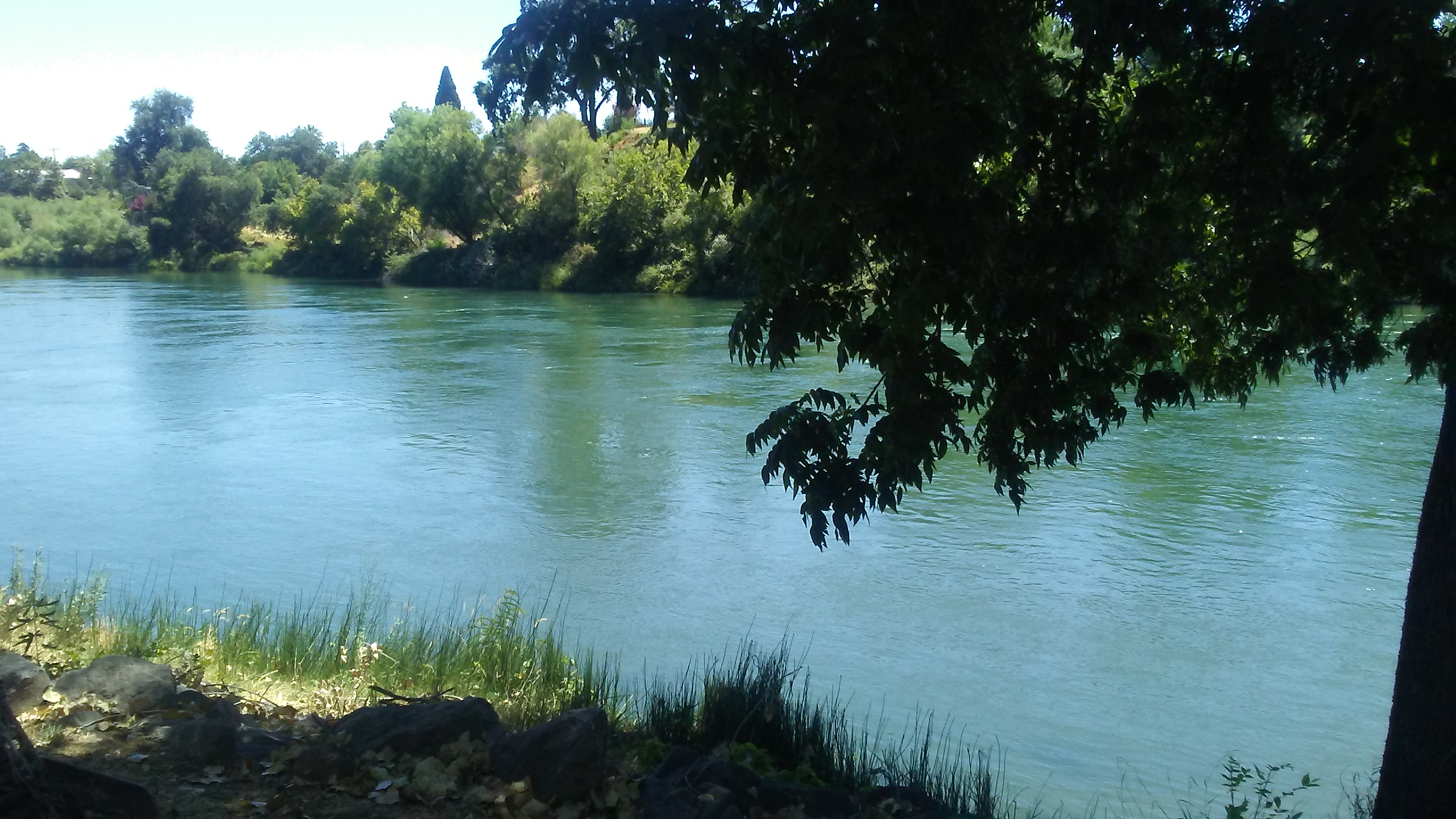
The Sacramento River running through Red Bluff

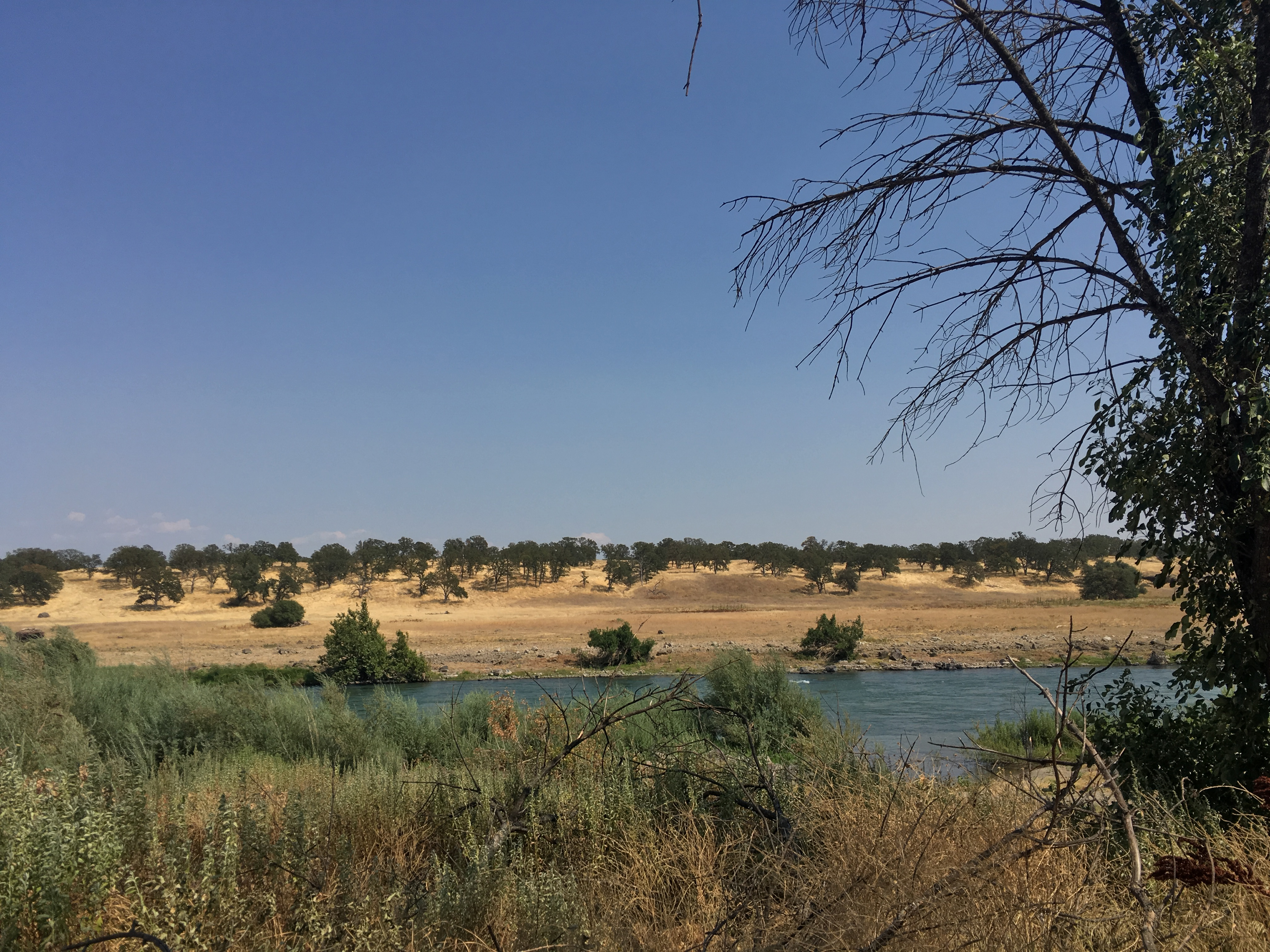
Sacramento River in Bend, California

=== Sacramento Valley ===
Below Shasta Dam the Sacramento River enters the foothills region of the northern Sacramento Valley. It flows through Keswick Dam, where it receives about 1,200,000 acre⋅ft (1.5×10^{−6} million km^{3}) of water per year diverted from the Trinity River. It then swings east through Redding, the largest city of the Shasta Cascade region, and turns southeast, entering Tehama County. East of Cottonwood it receives Cottonwood Creek – the largest undammed tributary – from the west, then Battle Creek a short distance downstream. Below Battle Creek it carves its last gorge, Iron Canyon, emerging from the hills at Red Bluff, where a pumping station (which replaced the Red Bluff Diversion Dam) removes water for irrigation. Beyond Red Bluff the river reaches the low floodplain of the Sacramento Valley, receiving Mill Creek from the east and Thomes Creek from the west near Los Molinos, then Deer Creek from the east near Vina.

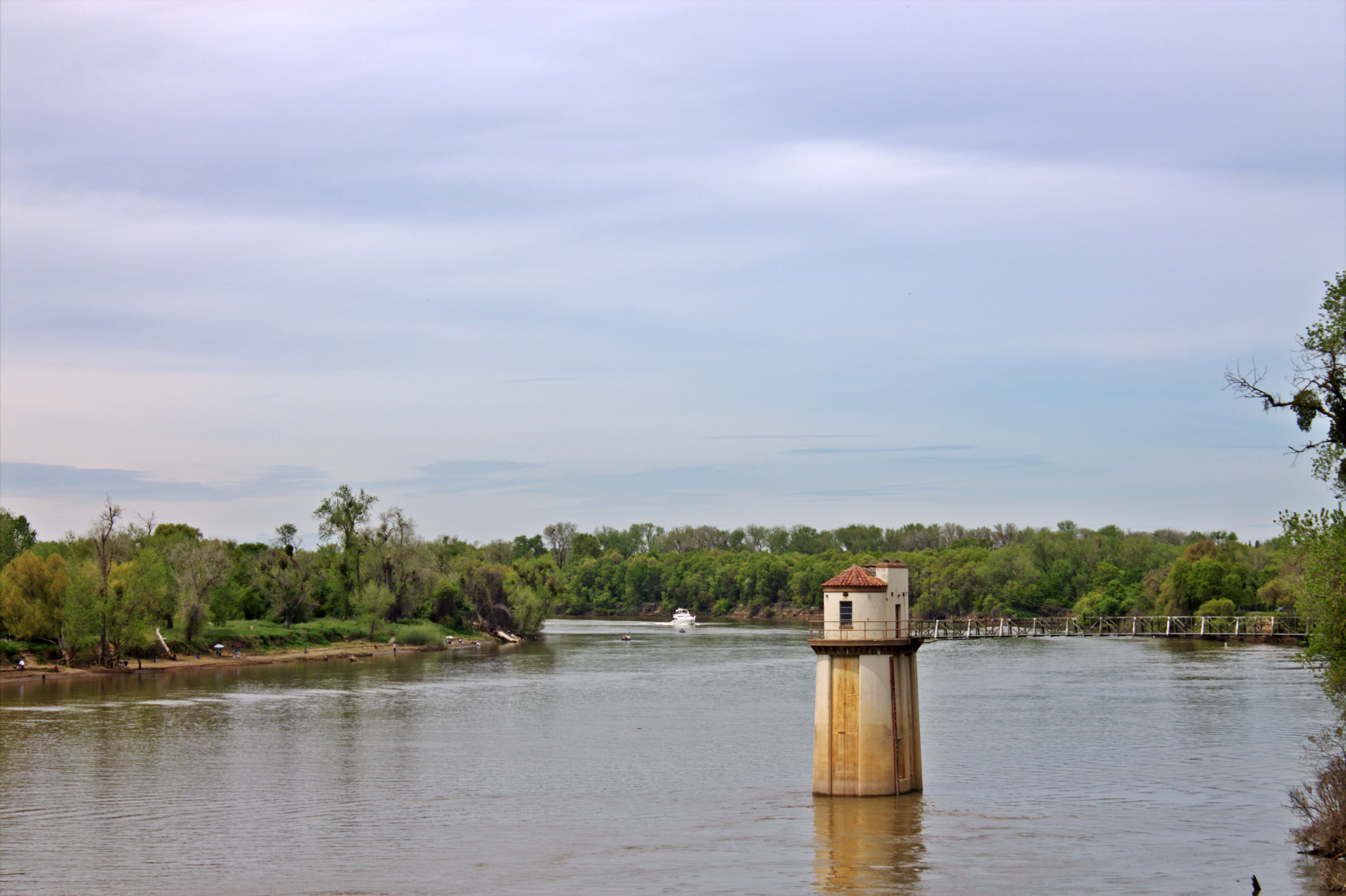
Sacramento River above Sacramento

Southeast of Corning, the Sacramento forms the boundary of Tehama County to the west and Butte County to the east. A few miles downstream it forms the border of Butte County and Glenn County to the west. Stony Creek joins from the west in Glenn County, near Hamilton City and about 15 miles (24 km) west of Chico. The river then forms the Glenn–Colusa County line for a short distance before crossing entirely into Colusa County. It passes by the Sutter Buttes, a group of volcanic hills that rise abruptly from the middle of the Sacramento Valley, where it receives Butte Creek from the east at Colusa. Below Colusa the river flows south-southeast, forming the border of Colusa County and Sutter County to the east.

About 20 miles (32 km) further downstream, the Sacramento River reaches the Tisdale Weir. During floods, water overtops the weir and flows east into the Sutter Bypass, the first of two major bypass channels that temporarily store and move floodwaters downstream to reduce pressure on the main channel of the Sacramento. The Sacramento River and the Sutter Bypass flow parallel for over 40 miles (64 km), rejoining on the border of Sutter County and Yolo County near Knights Landing. The Feather River, the largest tributary of the Sacramento, joins from the east at Verona directly below the Sutter Bypass. A second flood control structure, the Fremont Weir, diverts flood waters from both the Sacramento and Feather Rivers into the Yolo Bypass, which parallels the Sacramento River down the west side of the valley. Cache Creek and Putah Creek, two major tributaries which formerly joined the Sacramento River from the west, are now intercepted by the Yolo Bypass via man-made channels. The main channel of the Sacramento flows south, forming the Yolo–Sacramento County line.

=== Lower river ===
As the river continues south it approaches the Sacramento metro area, the largest population center in the watershed. Sacramento International Airport is located on the east bank of the river near Fremont. Near downtown Sacramento it receives the American River from the east, then passes under the historic Tower Bridge and Interstate 80 Business. The California State Capitol sits less than zero point five miles (0.80 km) east of the river where the Tower Bridge crosses it. Shortly downstream, the Port of Sacramento is located on the west side of the Sacramento, connected to the river by a lock. The Sacramento River Deep Water Ship Channel provides access to the port from the Pacific, bypassing about 42 miles (68 km) of the winding lower Sacramento. The channel runs parallel to the Sacramento several miles to the west, and also forms the eastern boundary of the Yolo Bypass. The manually operated Sacramento Weir, located across from downtown Sacramento on the west side of the river, serves to relieve floodwater pressure from the American River by allowing it to drain west into the Yolo Bypass instead of continuing down the Sacramento River.

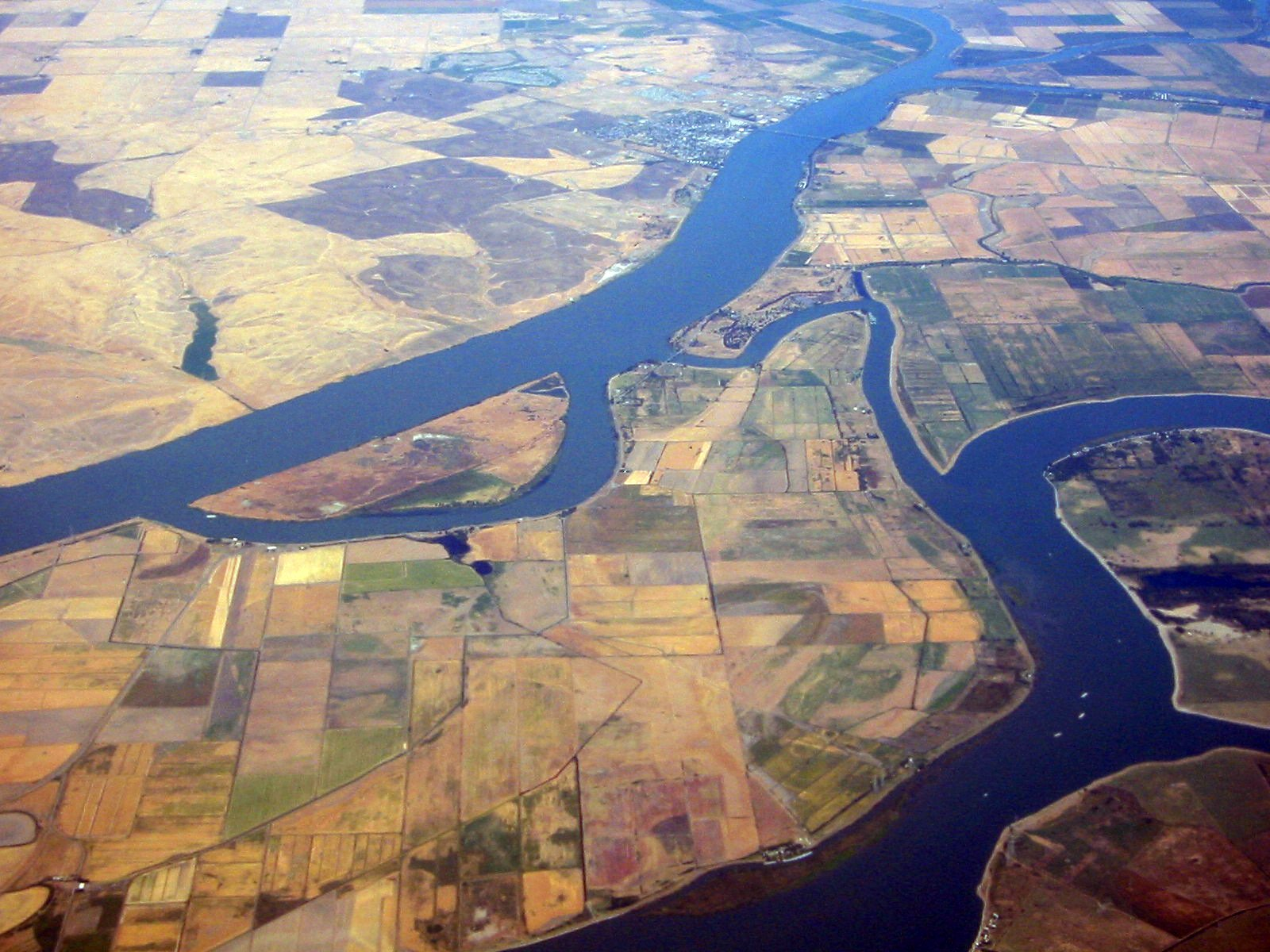
Aerial view of the Delta region, showing the Sacramento River (above) and the San Joaquin River

Downstream of Sacramento, the river enters the Sacramento–San Joaquin River Delta, a vast tidal estuary and inverted river delta of over 1,000 square miles (2,600 km^{2}) which receives the entire run-off of the Central Valley, a region covering a third of California. The Sacramento is by far the largest contributor of fresh water to the Delta; in an average year, it accounts for more than 80 percent of the fresh water inflow. At Walnut Grove, the manmade Delta Cross Channel connects the Sacramento to the Mokelumne River channel, allowing a portion of the water to be pumped south toward Clifton Court Forebay, the receiving reservoir for the main CVP and State Water Project aqueducts which irrigate millions of acres and supply water to over 23 million people in the San Joaquin Valley, the San Francisco Bay Area and Greater Los Angeles. Although river levels are tidally influenced here and occasionally as far north as Verona, the water stays fresh in all but the driest years. Saltwater intrusion from the Pacific Ocean was one of the main reasons for the construction of the federal Central Valley Project (CVP), whose dams maintain a minimum flow in the Sacramento River to keep seawater at bay.

Below Rio Vista, the lower Sacramento River is rejoined by the Deep Water Ship Channel and the Yolo Bypass and curves southwest along the base of the Montezuma Hills, forming the border of Solano and Sacramento Counties. This part of the river is dredged for navigation by large oceangoing vessels and averages three-quarters of a mile (1.2 km) across. North of Antioch and Pittsburg, the Sacramento and San Joaquin Rivers join at the head of Suisun Bay, marking the official end of both rivers. The combined waters flow west through Suisun Bay and the Carquinez Strait into San Pablo Bay and San Francisco Bay, joining the Pacific at the Golden Gate.

=== Discharge ===
Following the Columbia River, the Sacramento is the largest river by discharge on the Pacific coast of the continental United States. The natural runoff of the river is 22 million acre-feet (27 km^{3}) per year, or about 30,000 cubic feet per second (850 m^{3}/s). Before dams were built on its tributaries, the river flooded up to 650,000 cubic feet per second (18,000 m^{3}/s) during the rainy season, equal to the flow of the Mississippi River. Late summers of particularly dry years could see flows drop below 1,000 cubic feet per second (28 m^{3}/s). Large volumes of water are withdrawn from the Sacramento River for irrigation, industry and urban supplies. Annual depletions (water not returned to the river after use) are about 4.72 million acre-feet (5.82 km^{3}) for irrigation and 491,000 acre-feet (0.606 km^{3}) for urban use. An additional 7.61 million acre-feet (9.39 km^{3}) is reserved for environmental uses, primarily to maintain a minimum fresh water outflow in the Delta to combat salinity.

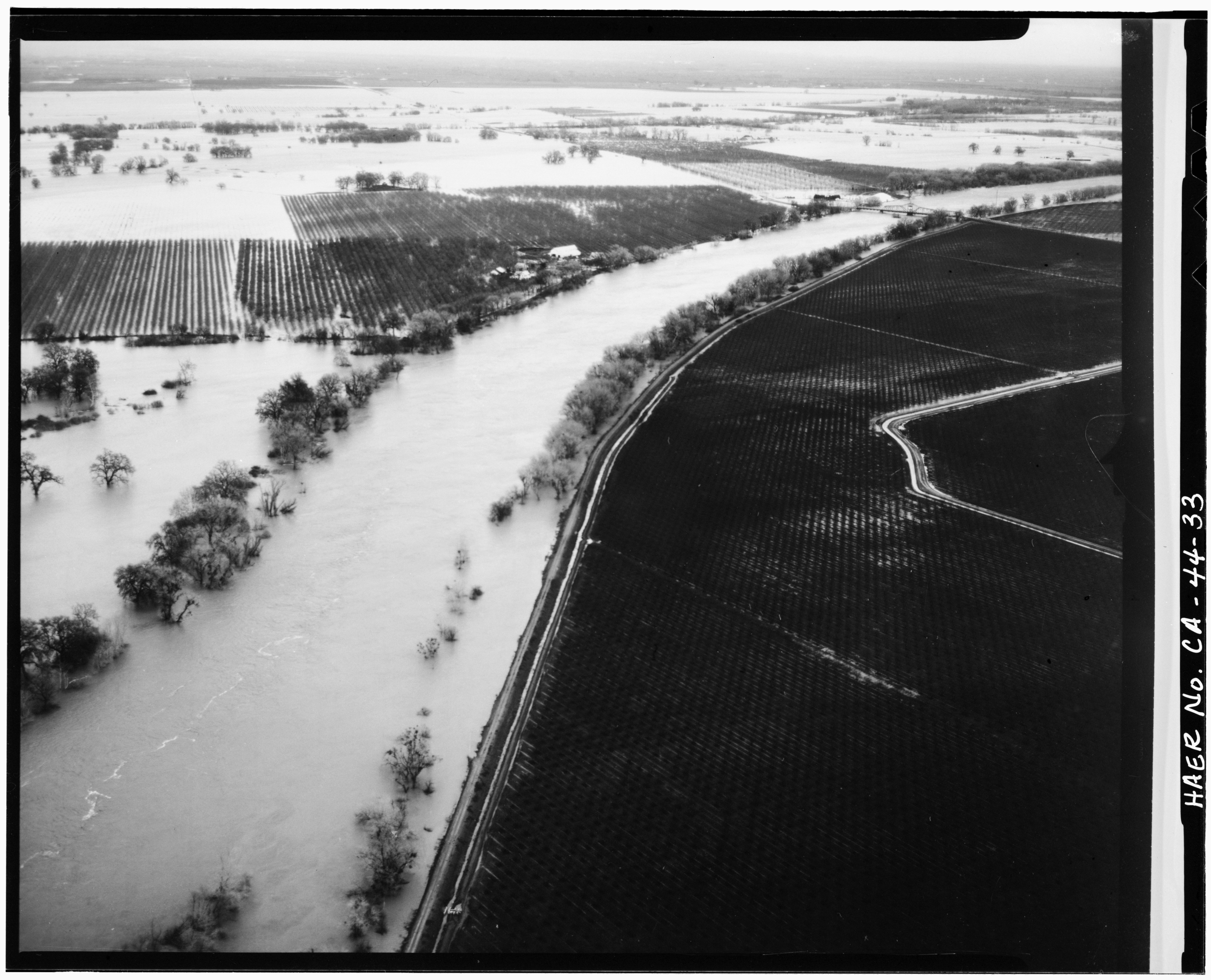
Flooding on the Sacramento River, January 24, 1970

The U.S. Geological Survey (USGS) has stream gauges on 25 locations along the Sacramento River, although not all of them are currently operational. The ones currently in operation are at Delta, California (near the source at Mount Shasta), at Keswick (near Redding), Colusa (about halfway down the river), Verona, and Freeport. The Freeport gauge, which sits just downstream of Sacramento, provides a relatively good metric of the annual outflow from the Sacramento River Basin. The average flow between 1949 and 2013 was 23,330 cubic feet per second (661 m^{3}/s). The maximum recorded flow was 115,000 cubic feet per second (3,300 m^{3}/s) on February 19, 1986; the lowest was 3,970 cubic feet per second (112 m^{3}/s) on October 15, 1977. Flow in the Yolo Bypass, a relief channel designed to carry a portion of the flood waters in order to protect the Sacramento area, is not measured by the Freeport gauge. A separate gauge on the bypass recorded an average throughput of 4,809 cubic feet per second (136.2 m^{3}/s) between 1939 and 2013, mostly from December–March. The highest recorded flow was 374,000 cubic feet per second (10,600 m^{3}/s) on February 20, 1986. During the dry season of July through September, the bypass carries low to zero flow.

Although the Sacramento River nominally begins near Mount Shasta, the true hydrological source of the Sacramento River system is the Pit River, which is by far the largest of the three rivers flowing into Shasta Lake. At the USGS Montgomery Creek gauge, the average flow of the Pit River was 4,760 cu ft/s (135 m^{3}/s) for the period 1966–2013. By comparison, the Sacramento River at Delta gauge, a few miles above Shasta Lake, recorded an average of 1,191 cu ft/s (33.7 m^{3}/s) for the period 1945–2013. The McCloud River had an average discharge of 775 cu ft/s (21.9 m^{3}/s) for the 1967–2013 period. Since the 1960s, the McCloud River flow has been reduced and the Pit River flow increased due to diversion of water for hydropower generation; however the total volume of water entering Shasta Lake remains the same. Before Shasta Dam was built, the volcanic springs feeding the Pit and McCloud Rivers provided the majority of river flow in dry summers when the Upper Sacramento and other tributaries slowed to a trickle.

Monthly combined discharge of Sacramento River at Freeport and Yolo Bypass near Woodland (cfs)

== Watershed ==
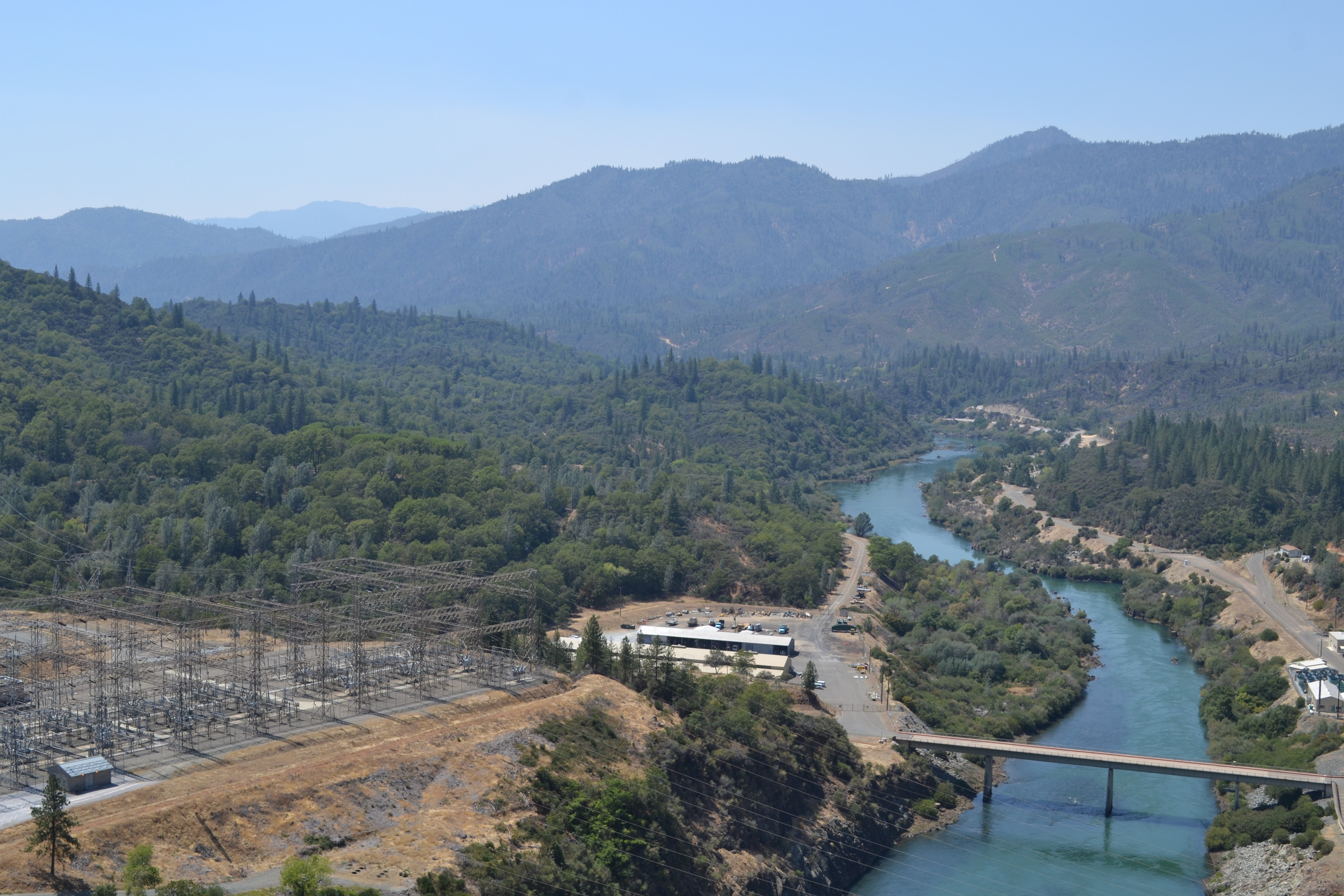
The Sacramento River below Shasta Dam

The Sacramento River's watershed is the largest entirely in California, covering much of the northern part of the state. The endorheic (closed) Goose Lake drainage basin in southern Oregon, however, has been known to overflow into the Sacramento River system during particularly wet years. The Sacramento River basin generally lies between the Sierra Nevada and Cascade Range on the east and the Coast Ranges and Klamath Mountains in the west, although the part of the basin drained by the Pit River extends east of the Cascades. The Pit River, has the distinction of being one of three rivers that cut through the main crest of the Cascades; its headwaters rise on the western extreme of the Basin and Range Province, east of major Cascade volcanoes such as Mount Shasta and Lassen Peak. The other two are the Klamath River and Columbia River.

By discharge, it is the second-largest contiguous U.S. river draining into the Pacific, after only the Columbia River, which has almost ten times the flow of the Sacramento. The Colorado River, which reaches the Gulf of California just south of the US-Mexico border near the southeast part of the state, is far larger than the Sacramento in terms of length and drainage area but has a slightly smaller flow. The Sacramento, when combined with the Pit, is also one of the longest rivers in the United States entirely within one state—after Alaska's Kuskokwim and Texas' Trinity.

The major drainage basins bordering that of the Sacramento are that of the Klamath in the north, the San Joaquin and Mokelumne to the south and the Eel River in the west. The Russian River also lies to the west and the endorheic (closed) Honey Lake and Eagle Lake basins to the north. On the east side are many endorheic watersheds of the Great Basin including the Truckee River and Carson River. Parts of the Sacramento watershed come very close to, but do not extend past, the border of California and Nevada.

=== Physiography ===
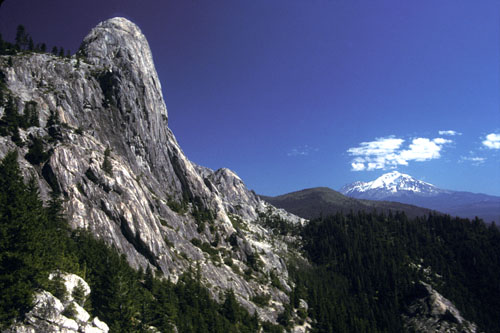
The Castle Crags, a series of granite peaks rising above the upper Sacramento River canyon just to the right. Mount Shasta, the highest mountain in the Sacramento drainage, is seen in the distance.

The basin's diverse geography ranges from the glacier-carved, snowcapped peaks of the Sierra Nevada to the sea-level (and often lower) marshes and farmlands of the Sacramento-San Joaquin Delta. The highest point is 14,104 feet (4,299 m) at Mount Shasta, a dormant stratovolcano near the headwaters of the Sacramento River. The Sierra Nevada peaks generally decrease in height from south to north—from over 10,000 feet (3,000 m) in the headwaters of the American River near Lake Tahoe, to 5,000 to 7,000 feet (1,500 to 2,100 m) in Lassen County where they adjoin the Cascade Range. On the west side, the Coast Ranges are the opposite, increasing in height to almost 10,000 feet (3,000 m) in the north. The arid volcanic plateaus in the northeast, which are characterized by alternating hills and large sedimentary basins, typically lie at elevations of 3,000 to 5,000 feet (910 to 1,520 m).

Most of the Sacramento Valley is below 300 feet (91 m) in elevation; in its lower course, the Sacramento River drops only about 1 foot (0.30 m) per mile. Between the bajadas or alluvial slopes extending from the foothills of the Sierra Nevada and Coast Ranges, are the low floodplains of the Sacramento River. The river flows at an elevation somewhat higher than the surrounding terrain due to deposits of sediment over millennia that created raised banks (essentially natural levees). The banks separate the river from the lowlands to the east and west that once served as vast overflow basins during winter storms, creating large areas of seasonal wetlands. Since the 19th century, artificial levee systems have been constructed to enable farming in the fertile flood plain. Today there are 2,000,000 acres (8,100 km^{2}) of irrigated farmland in the Sacramento Valley. Due to the reduction of the floodplain area, the speed of flood flow in the Sacramento River has increased, creating a significant hazard for the farms and towns along its course. By the early 20th century engineers had realized not all the floodplains could be safely reclaimed, leading to the intentional creation of flood bypasses where development is limited to annual crops and recreational uses.

Further south, much of the delta region is actually below sea level: subsidence caused by wind erosion and intensive farming have caused the land in the delta to gradually sink since the late 19th century. Many of the delta islands would be underwater if not for the maintenance of the levees and pumps that keep them dry. Some of the "islands" are now up to 25 feet (7.6 m) below the adjacent channels and sloughs.

=== Land use ===
The Sacramento River watershed is home to about 2.8 million people; more than two-thirds live within the Sacramento metropolitan area. Other important cities are Chico, Redding, Davis and Woodland. The Sacramento River watershed covers all or most of Shasta, Tehama, Glenn, Butte, Plumas, Yuba, Sutter, Lake and Yolo Counties. It also extends into portions of Siskiyou, Modoc, Lassen, Lake (in Oregon), Sierra, Nevada, Placer, El Dorado, Sacramento, Solano and Contra Costa Counties. The river itself flows through Siskiyou, Shasta, Tehama, Butte, Glenn, Colusa, Sutter, Yolo, Sacramento, Solano and Contra Costa, often forming boundaries between the counties.

Many of the mountainous regions of the watershed are administered by the U.S. Forest Service. The Sacramento River watershed includes large areas of coniferous forests in the Mendocino and Trinity National Forests in the Coast Ranges, Shasta and Lassen National Forests in the southern Cascades and the Plumas, Tahoe and Eldorado National Forests on the western slopes of the Sierra Nevada. The watershed also has Lassen Volcanic National Park, which covers 106,000 acres (430 km^{2}) centered on Lassen Peak, the southernmost Cascade volcano. Whiskeytown-Shasta-Trinity National Recreation Area, which is over 200,000 acres (810 km^{2}) in size, straddles much of the upper Sacramento and Trinity Rivers, and is named for the three local reservoirs (Shasta Lake, Trinity Lake and Whiskeytown Lake) which are popular tourist areas. Many other state parks and recreation areas lie within the watershed.

== Geology ==
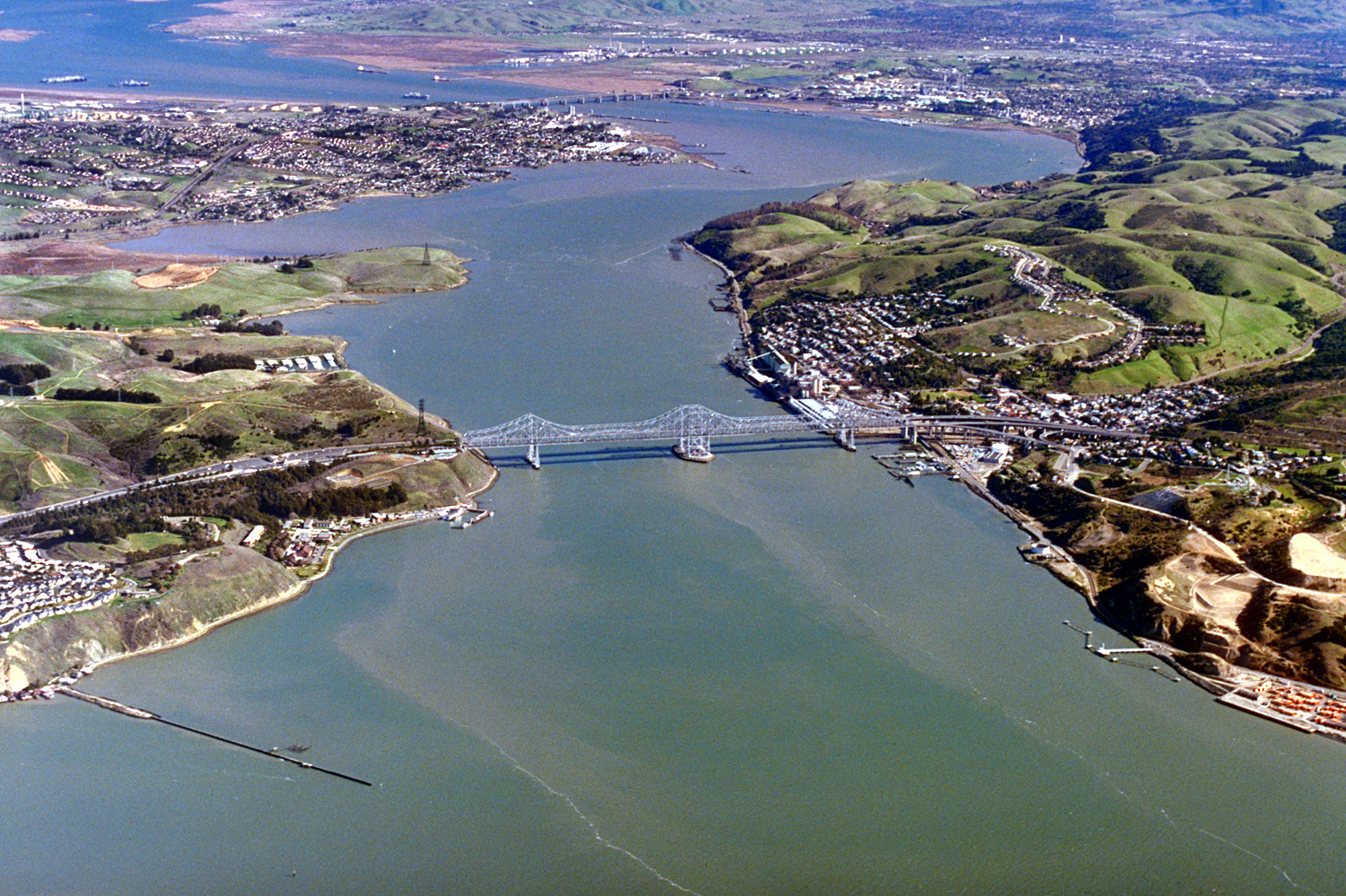
The Carquinez Strait, which connects the Sacramento-San Joaquin Delta and Suisun Bay to San Pablo and San Francisco Bays, and then the Pacific. The channel formed from water flooding over the Coast Ranges from a gigantic lake that formed in the Central Valley a few hundred thousand years ago, when the rising mountains blocked the Sacramento's route to the Pacific Ocean.

By geologic standards, the Sacramento is a fairly young river; the borders of its watershed began to form only a few million years ago as magma welling up below the Earth's crust pushed up by the Pacific Plate colliding with the North American Plate caused the formation of the Sierra Nevada. Although mountains had existed as early as 100 million years ago in this region (before then the land was probably submerged under the Pacific), they were worn by erosion, and the present-day range only formed about 4 million years ago. The northern part of the Sacramento watershed is more ancient, and was formed by intense volcanic activity over 25 million years ago, resulting in lava flows that covered and created the Modoc Plateau, through which the Pit River flows. Mount Shasta and Lassen Peak are among the numerous Cascade Range volcanoes that still stand in the area.

As the Sierra rose, water erosion and glaciation carved deep canyons, depositing massive amounts of sediment to form a coastal plain between the mountains and the Pacific Ocean. About 3 million years ago, multiple terranes were formed and smashed into the North American Plate from the Pacific Plate, causing the uplift of the California Coast Ranges, enclosing the Sacramento Valley and forcing the streams within to flow south instead of west, forming the ancestral Sacramento River. (The Klamath Mountains, which enclose the northwest part of the Sacramento Basin, were formed in the same way but are much older, dating back 7.5 million years.) It is possible that the river once had its outlet in Monterey Bay, and may have played a part in the formation of the 300-mile (480 km) Monterey Submarine Canyon when sea levels were lower during the Ice Ages.

The Monterey Bay outlet of the Sacramento and San Joaquin rivers was blocked off by uplift about 2 million years ago, and runoff from the Sierra began to transform the Central Valley into a gigantic lake, called Lake Clyde. This lake stretched 500 miles (800 km) north to south and was at least 1,000 feet (300 m) deep. About 650,000 years ago the lake catastrophically overflowed, draining into San Francisco Bay and creating the Carquinez Strait, the only major break for hundreds of miles in the Coast Ranges. The narrow outlet trapped some of the sediments of the rivers in the Central Valley, forming the inland Sacramento-San Joaquin River Delta. Since then, this inland sea has periodically reformed during times of intense flooding, the most recent being the Great Flood of 1862. Dams, levees and floodways constructed during the 20th century have thus far prevented this phenomenon from re-occurring.

== History ==
=== Native Americans ===
The Sacramento River and its valley were one of the major Native American population centers of California. The river's abundant flow and the valley's fertile soil and mild climate provided enough resources for hundreds of groups to share the land. Most of the villages were small. Although it was once commonly believed that the original natives lived as tribes, they actually lived as bands, family groups as small as twenty to thirty people. The Sacramento Valley was first settled by humans about 12,000 years ago, but permanent villages were not established until about 8,000 years ago. Historians have organized the numerous separate original native groups into several "tribes". These are known as the Shasta, Modoc, and Achomawi/Pit River Tribes of the volcanic plateaus in the north; the Wintu and Hupa in the northern Klamath and Trinity mountains; the Nomlaki, Yuki, Patwin, and Pomo of the Coast Ranges; the Yana, Atsugewi, Maidu, Konkow, and Nisenan in the Sierra and their western foothills; and the Miwok in the south.

Most of the Sacramento Valley's native peoples relied on hunting, gathering and fishing, although agriculture was practiced in a few areas. Settlement size ranged from small camps to villages of 30–50 permanent structures. Acorns were a staple food, and the Sacramento Valley's riparian zones, which supported seven species of native oaks, provided these in abundance. Native Americans pounded the acorns into flour, which they used to make bread and cakes. Abundant salmon and steelhead runs in the Sacramento River and its tributaries were harvested using fishing weirs, platforms, baskets and nets. The river also provided shellfish, sturgeon, eel and suckerfish They also hunted waterfowl, antelope and deer which all existed in huge numbers in the rich valley bottom and marsh lands. Before European contact, the indigenous population of the Sacramento Valley has been estimated at 76,000 people.

=== European exploration and settlement ===
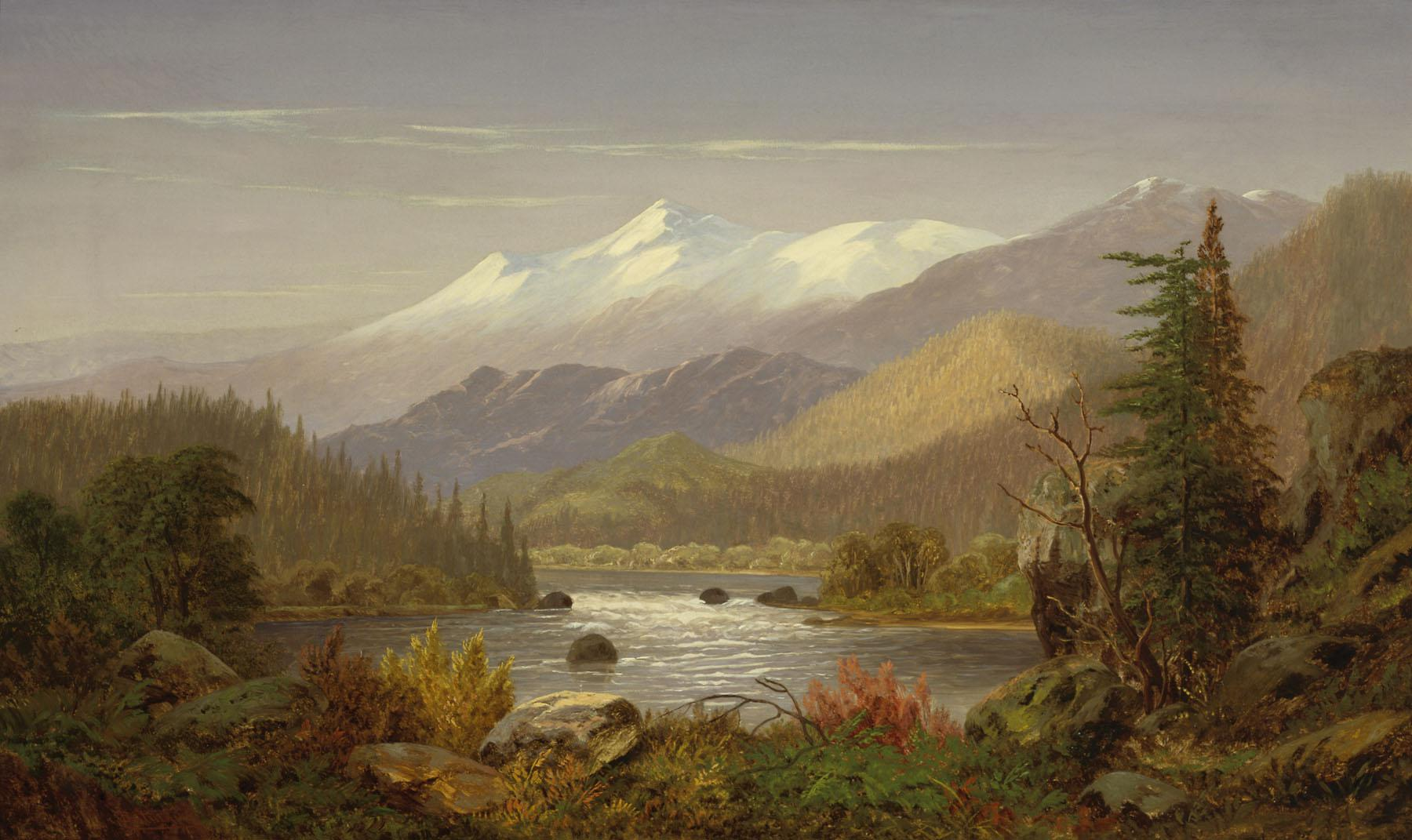
Mt. Shasta and the Sacramento River by Frederick A. Butman (1820–1871)

The first outsiders to see the river were probably the members of a Spanish colonial-exploratory venture to Northern California in 1772, led by Captain Pedro Fages. The group ascended a mountain, likely in the hills north of Suisun Bay, and found themselves looking down at the delta of the Sacramento and San Joaquin Rivers. However, due to their vantage point, neither Fages nor any of his men saw the Sacramento clearly. They assumed that the San Joaquin, coming from the south, was the largest of the merging rivers they saw. In 1808, explorer Gabriel Moraga, on a journey to find suitable sites for the construction of missions, became the first foreigner to see the river clearly. Judging its huge breadth and power he named it Rio de los Sacramentos, or "River of the Blessed Sacrament". In the following years, two more Spanish expeditions traversed the lower part of the river, the last one in 1817.

The next visitors were Hudson's Bay Company (HBC) fur trappers exploring southwards from the disputed Oregon Country, starting in the 1820s. The first organized expedition, led by Peter Skene Ogden, arrived in the area of Mount Shasta in 1826. By this time, California was under the control of Mexico, although few Mexican settlers had come to what would later become the state, mostly settling in the small pueblos and ranchos along the south and central coast. The HBC mountain men created the Siskiyou Trail out of several Native American paths that ran through the mountains between Oregon's Willamette Valley and the northern part of the Sacramento Valley. In the years to come, this path, which eventually extended from San Francisco to Portland, Oregon following parts of the Sacramento, Willamette, Klamath, Rogue, and other rivers would become an important trade and travel route.

=== Gold Rush ===
Although just one of thousands of American emigrants that poured into California over the next few years when California became part of the United States, John Augustus Sutter's arrival marked a turning point in the history of the Sacramento Valley, and California as a whole. In 1841, Sutter and his men built a fortress at the confluence of the Sacramento and American Rivers and the Mexican government granted him almost 50,000 acres (200 km^{2}) of land surrounding the two rivers. Naming it New Helvetia, he created an agricultural empire in the lower Sacramento Valley, attracting several hundred settlers to the area, and relied on Native American labor to maintain his domain. Sutter had something of a two-faced relationship with the many Native American groups in the area. He was friendly with some of the tribes, and paid their leaders handsomely for supplying workers, but others he seized by force to labor in the fields.

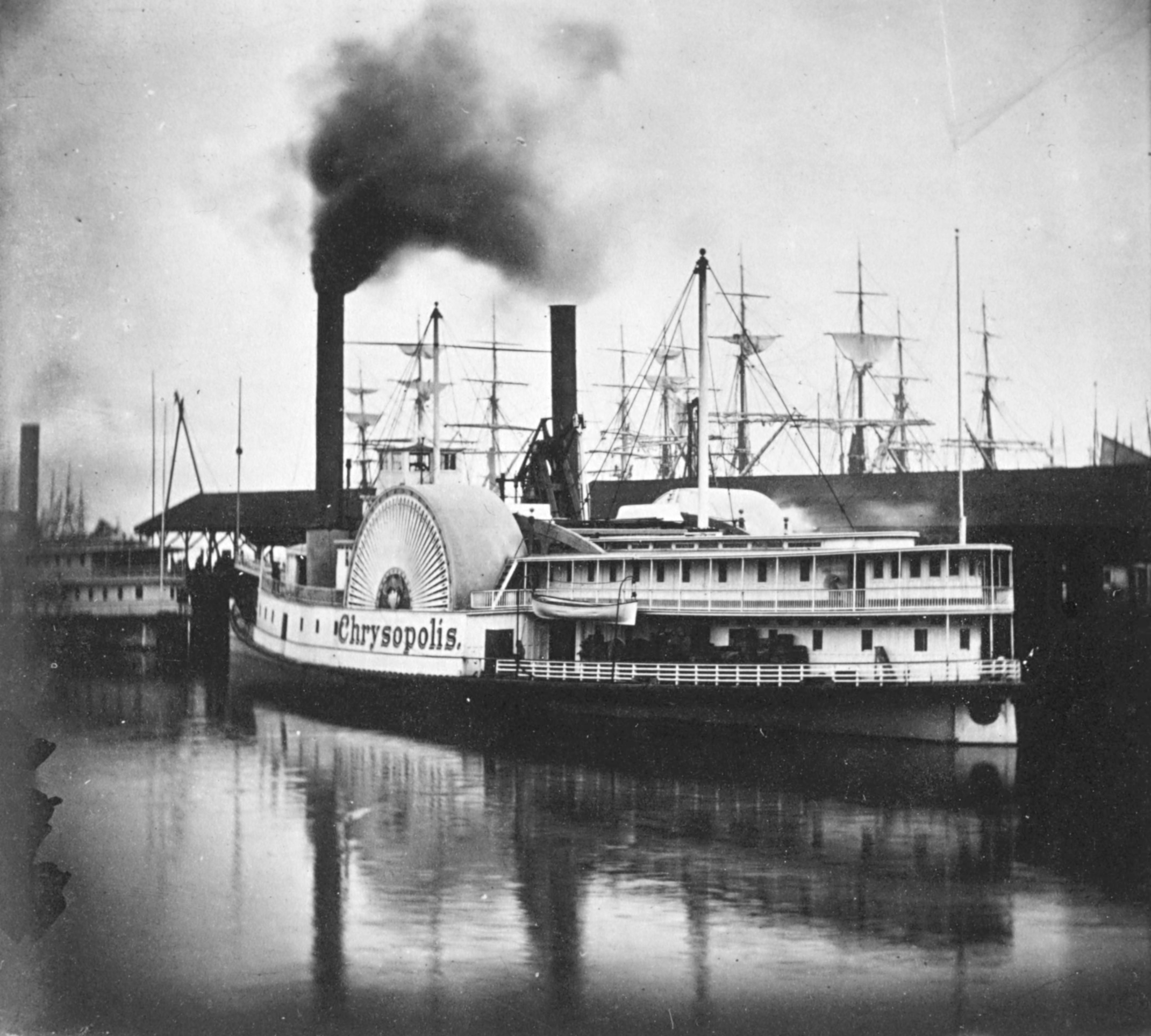
Chrysopolis, one of several large steamboats that served for transportation on the river during the California Gold Rush

After the Bear Flag Revolt of 1846 and the Mexican–American War, in which California became part of the United States, Sutter and other large landholders in California held on to their properties. In 1848 Sutter assigned James W. Marshall to build a sawmill on the South Fork American River at Coloma, where Marshall discovered gold. Although Sutter and Marshall originally intended to keep the find a secret, news soon broke attracting three hundred thousand hopefuls from all over North America, and even the world, to the Sacramento River in search of fortunes, kicking off the California Gold Rush. People flocked to the region by the Oregon Trail-Siskiyou Trail, California Trail, Southern Emigrant Trail and various land and/or sea routes through the Isthmus of Panama and around southern South America by ship. Steamboats traveled up and down the Sacramento River carrying miners from San Francisco to the gold fields. As the miners expanded their diggings deeper into the Sierra Nevada and Klamath Mountains, Native Americans were pushed off their land and a long series of skirmishes and fights began that continued until intervention by the state and national governments.

=== Post-Gold Rush development and effects ===
The influx of migrants brought foreign diseases like malaria and smallpox, which American Indians had no immunity to. These diseases killed off a large proportion of their population within a few decades of the arrival of Sutter and the following settlers, the start of the gold rush, not to mention the numerous battles fought between the settlers and native bands as well as the forced relocation of some of the tribes to Indian reservations in several places scattered around the Sacramento Valley, mainly in the Coast Ranges. In the early 1850s, several treaties were signed between the U.S. government and the Native Americans involving their relocation onto a reservation in the Sierra foothills; this promise was broken. Therefore, in 1863, the tribes from the area surrounding the middle Sacramento and Feather rivers, the Konkow group, were removed and marched forcibly to the Round Valley Indian Reservation near the Eel River. A total of 461 people were forced from their homes, but only 277 made it to the reservation; the others perished of disease, starvation or exhaustion.

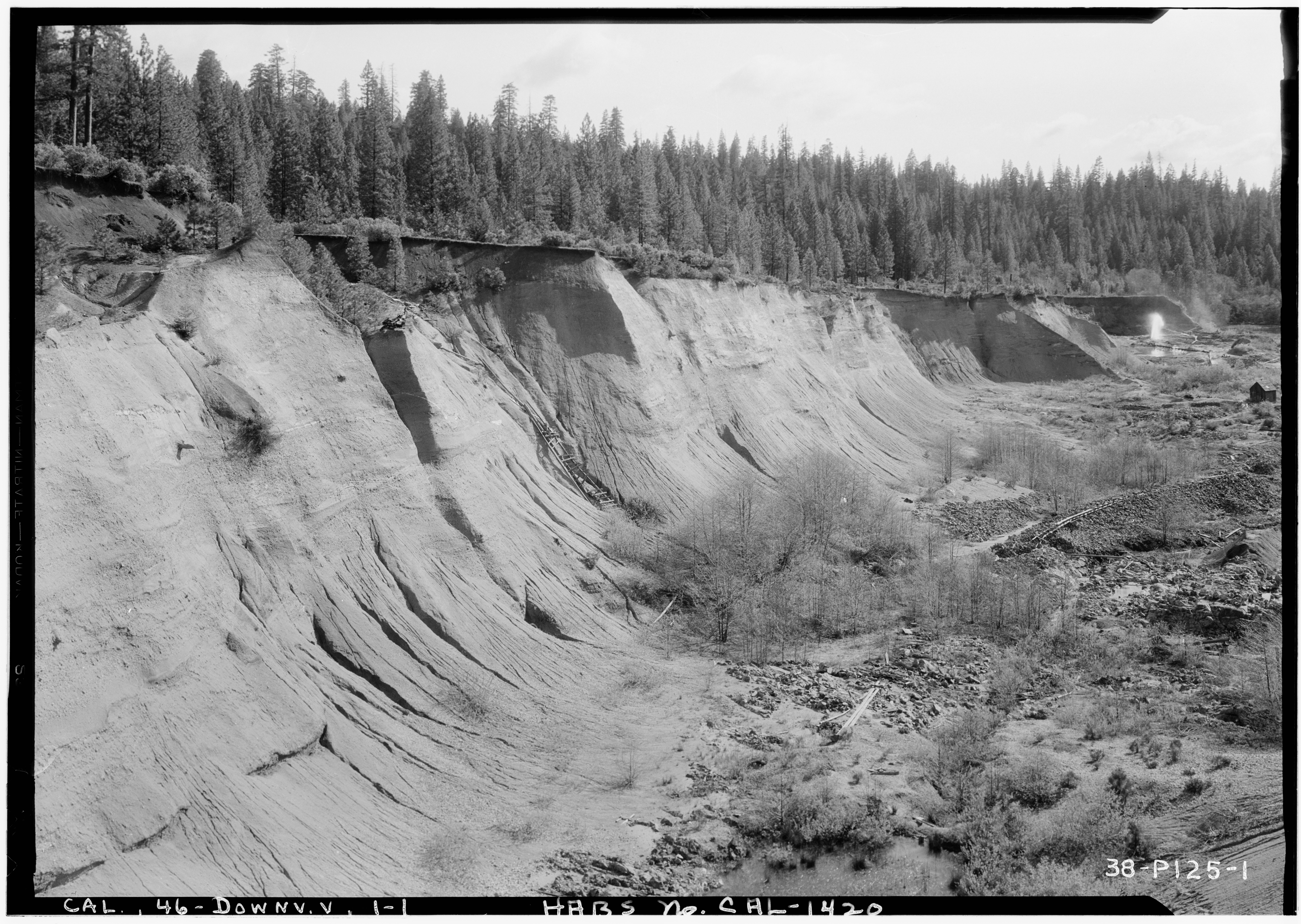
Environmental damage caused by hydraulic mining near Downieville, on the North Yuba River

As mining developed from simple methods such as panning and sluicing to a new form of commercialized extraction, hydraulic mining, profits from the petering gold rush made a second leap, earning more profits than placer miners in the early years had ever made. The city of Sacramento, founded on the original site of Sutter's fort, began to flourish as the center of an agricultural empire that provided food to feed the thousands of miners working in the hills as well as a place of financial exchange of all the gold that was mined. Sacramento was officially established in 1850 and was recognized as the state capital in 1854. As the economy of the Sacramento Valley grew, the Southern Pacific Railroad established tracks along the river to connect California with Oregon following the ancient path of the Siskiyou Trail, in the 1880s and 1890s. Many parts of the railroad were treacherous, especially in the mountainous areas north of Dunsmuir.

It was not long after Sacramento surpassed a population of 10,000, then the Great Flood of 1862 swept away much of it (and almost everything else along the Sacramento River) and put the rest under water. The flood waters were exacerbated by the sediments washed down by the millions of tons by hydraulic mining, which filled the beds of the Sacramento, Feather and American rivers up to 7 feet (2.1 m) in Sacramento and also covered thousands of acres of Central Valley lands. A flood in 1875 covered the city of Marysville and when it subsided the town's streets were filled with debris and rocks washed down from the "hydraulicking" going on upstream.

Repeated floods and increased demand for Sacramento River water saw a plethora of massive changes to the environment beginning in the 20th century. An early project was undertaken to raise the entire city of Sacramento about 11 feet (3.4 m) above its original elevation. This was followed by much bigger engineering projects to control and store the floodwaters of the Sacramento River; the building of these public works would radically transform the river during the 20th century.

== Dams and water use ==
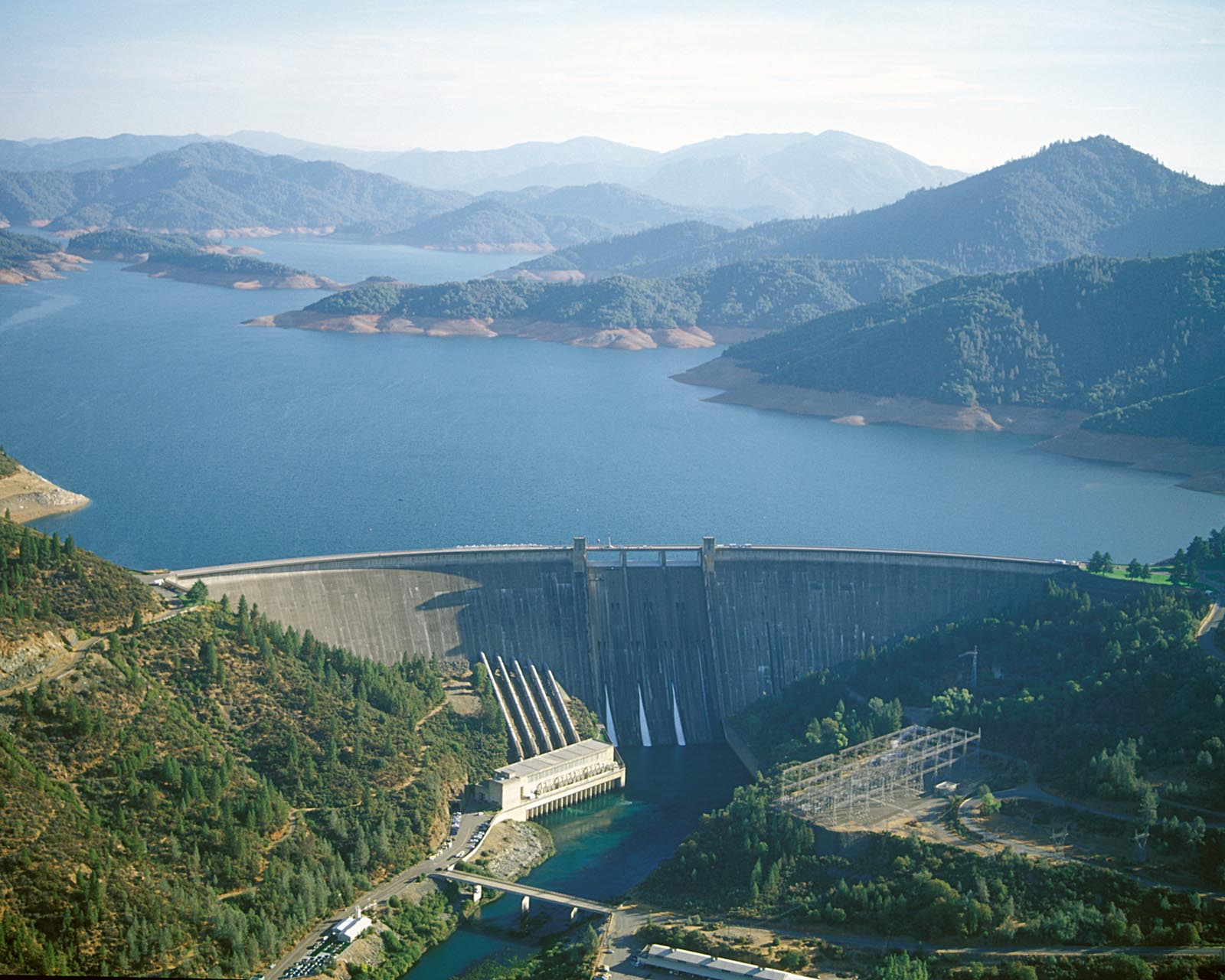
Shasta Dam

From the late 19th century through the 20th century, California experienced an economic boom that led to the rapid expansion of both agriculture and urban areas. The Central Valley was becoming a heavily developed irrigation farming region, and cities along the state's Pacific coast and the Sacramento and San Joaquin rivers were growing rapidly, requiring river control to prevent flooding on the one hand, and to ensure a consistent supply of water on the other. The U.S. Army Corps of Engineers and the State of California completed reports as early as the 1870s and 1880s which outlined future development of the Sacramento, Feather, Yuba and Bear rivers.

In 1873, Colonel B.S. Alexander of the Army Corps of Engineers surveyed the Central Valley's hydrology and irrigation systems and proposed a great network of pumps and canals that would take water from the Sacramento River in the north, and transport it to drought-prone central and southern California, especially the San Joaquin Valley. The Sacramento River basin receives "two-thirds to three-quarters of northern California's precipitation though it has only one-third to one-quarter of the land. The San Joaquin River watershed occupies two-thirds to three-quarters of northern California's land, but only collects one-third to one-quarter of the precipitation." The topography of the Sacramento River watershed makes it particularly prone to flooding. Storm water runs quickly off the steep mountains flanking the Sacramento Valley, but with few exceptions the alluvial valley floor is strikingly flat, slowing down the runoff and causing it to overflow the river banks. Before flood control works were built, the winter floods frequently transformed the valley into an inland sea. In 1880 State Engineer William H. Hall developed the first flood control plan for the Sacramento River. Hall recognized that with the combination of flat topography and extremely heavy winter runoff volumes, a system of levees alone could not hope to contain flooding, as had been proven time and again in the flood prone city of Sacramento.

=== Sacramento River Flood Control Project ===
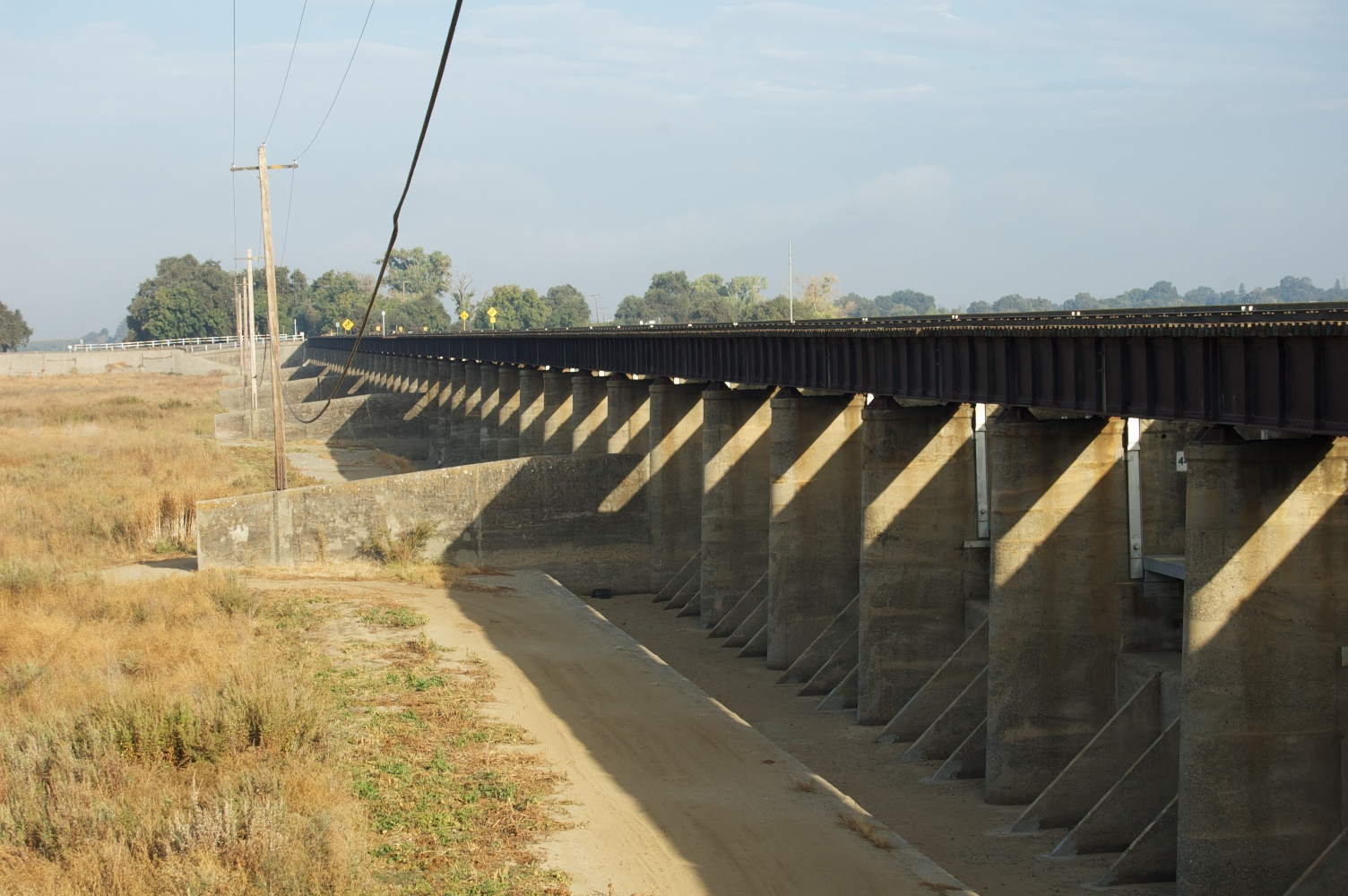
Sacramento Weir is one of several structures along the Sacramento River designed to drain excess floodwaters.

The Sacramento River Flood Control Project was authorized by the federal government in 1917. While it intended to contain minor floods in the river banks by strengthening the existing levee system, the main feature was a series of bypasses, or sections of the valley intentionally designed to flood during high water. Weirs placed at strategic points along the Sacramento River release water into the bypasses when the river reaches a certain stage, relieving the pressure of floodwaters on the main channel. The bypasses are then allowed to drain slowly once flood crests have passed. For most of the year, the bypasses remain dry and are used for annual crops such as rice. Some of the principal features are the Butte Basin, Colusa Basin, Sutter Bypass and the Yolo Bypass. The Butte Basin is a large lowland area on the east side of the river between Hamilton City and Colusa; the geographically similar Colusa Basin is located to the west. The Sutter Bypass begins at Colusa and runs parallel to the east side of the Sacramento River until reaching the confluence with the Feather River. The Yolo Bypass, located on the west side of the river, starts at the confluence of the Feather and rejoins the Sacramento in the Delta. Although termed "bypasses", the system essentially reconnects the Sacramento with a portion of its historic flood plain, which it would have naturally flooded had the levee system not been in place.

=== Central Valley Project ===
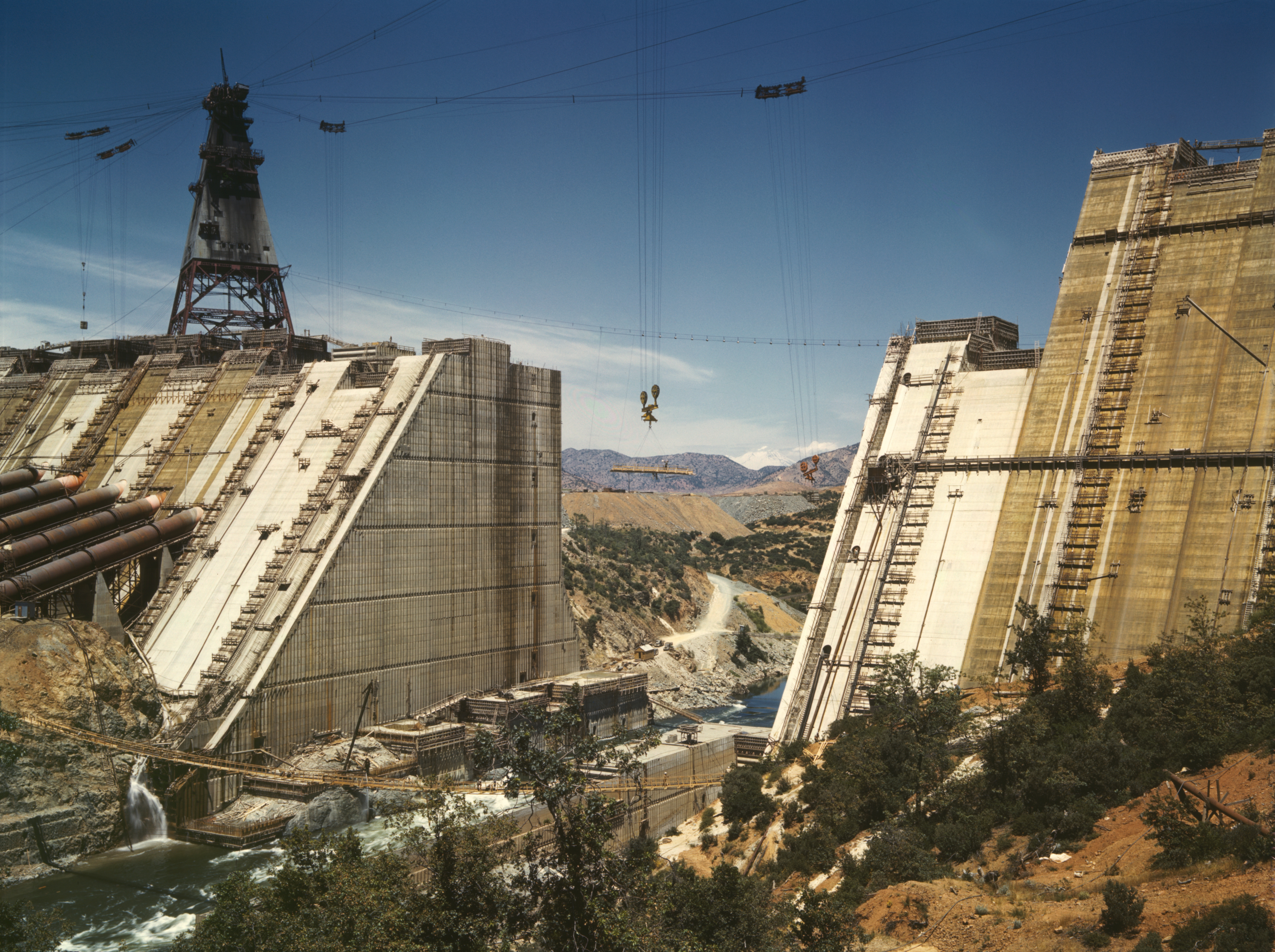
Construction work on Shasta Dam in June 1942

During the Great Depression in the 1930s, the first concrete proposals for a statewide water engineering project emerged, but when the state government could not sell the necessary bonds to fund the project, the federal government took over. The Central Valley Project, one of the largest irrigation projects in the world, was constructed by the U.S. Bureau of Reclamation beginning in 1935. Ultimately, the system would distribute 7 million acre-feet (8.6 km^{3}) to irrigate 3 million acres (1.2 million ha) of land in the Sacramento and San Joaquin Valleys. Construction of Shasta Dam, the principal water storage facility in the Sacramento River system, started in 1938 and was completed in 1945. Controlling runoff from the upper 6,600 square miles (17,000 km^{2}) of the Sacramento River watershed, Shasta greatly reduces flood peaks on the middle and lower parts of the Sacramento River. Flood waters are stored for irrigation in dry years as well as navigation and electricity generation. In the following decades, more huge reservoirs – capable of storing a combined 13×10^{6} acre-feet (16 km^{3}) of water – were constructed on the Sacramento's main tributaries, enabling the regulation of water for irrigation and hydroelectric power. Starting in the late 1950s, two major canals were extended to irrigate the western side of the Sacramento Valley – the Tehama-Colusa and Corning Canals. Starting at the Red Bluff Diversion Dam on the Sacramento, the canals are 111 and 21 mi (179 and 34 km) long respectively, and divert a total of over 3,000 cubic feet per second (85 m^{3}/s) of water to irrigate some 150,000 acres (610 km^{2}).

=== State Water Project ===
In 1960, construction began on the State Water Project, whose primary purpose was to deliver water to Los Angeles and the San Francisco Bay Area. Oroville Dam – the tallest dam in the U.S. – was built on the Sacramento's largest tributary, the Feather River. A series of channels were enlarged in the Delta to facilitate water flow from the Sacramento to the Banks Pumping Plant and the California Aqueduct, which can carry as much as 4.2 million acre-feet (5.2 km^{3}) of water each year. From its origin at the Delta the canal runs 444 miles (715 km) southwards through the west side of the San Joaquin Valley, providing irrigation water to farmlands along its length, and lifted almost 3,000 feet (910 m) over the Tehachapi Mountains via four large pumping stations. The project irrigates 750,000 acres (300,000 ha) of land in the San Joaquin Valley and serves 22 million people in Central and Southern California.

Over the years, several other plans materialized to divert rivers from California's North Coast into the Sacramento watershed, as future demand was projected to exceed supply. The only one to be built was the Trinity River Project (which would become part of the CVP), sending over 90 percent of the flow of that river into the Sacramento via a tunnel under the Klamath Mountains. Due to environmental damage and fish kills in the Trinity River, the volume of diverted water has been limited by law since the 1990s. Other, larger projects ultimately failed to take root. One of the most notorious, the Klamath Diversion, proposed to send the entire flow of the Klamath River into the Sacramento River through a system of large reservoirs, canals, pumping stations and tunnels. Similarly, the Dos Rios Dam project would have diverted a considerable portion of the Eel River to the Sacramento. Both projects were defeated by local resistance, opposition from environmentalists, as well as the high capital cost.

=== Navigation ===
The Sacramento River Deep Water Ship Channel was completed in 1963, and was built to facilitate navigation of large oceangoing ships from the Delta to the port of Sacramento. The channel bypasses the winding lower part of the Sacramento River between the state capital and the Delta thus reducing water travel times. It also serves to discharge floodwaters from the lower end of the Yolo Bypass. Built by the Army Corps of Engineers, the canal is 43 miles (69 km) long and is maintained to a depth of 30 feet (9.1 m).

== Ecology and environmental issues ==
The Sacramento River and its drainage basin once supported extensive riparian habitat and marshes, in both the Sacramento Valley and the Delta, home to a diverse array of flora and fauna. Due to the reclamation of land for agriculture and the regulation of seasonal flooding, the amount of water-based habitat declined greatly during the 20th century. Other human impacts include the heavy water consumption for agriculture and urban areas, and pollution caused by pesticides, nitrates, mine tailings, acid mine drainage and urban runoff. The Sacramento supports 40–60 species of fish, and 218 species of birds. The basin also has a number of endemic amphibian and fish species. Many Sacramento River fish species are similar to those in the Snake–Columbia River systems; geologic evidence indicates that the two were connected by a series of wetlands and channels about 4–5 million years ago.

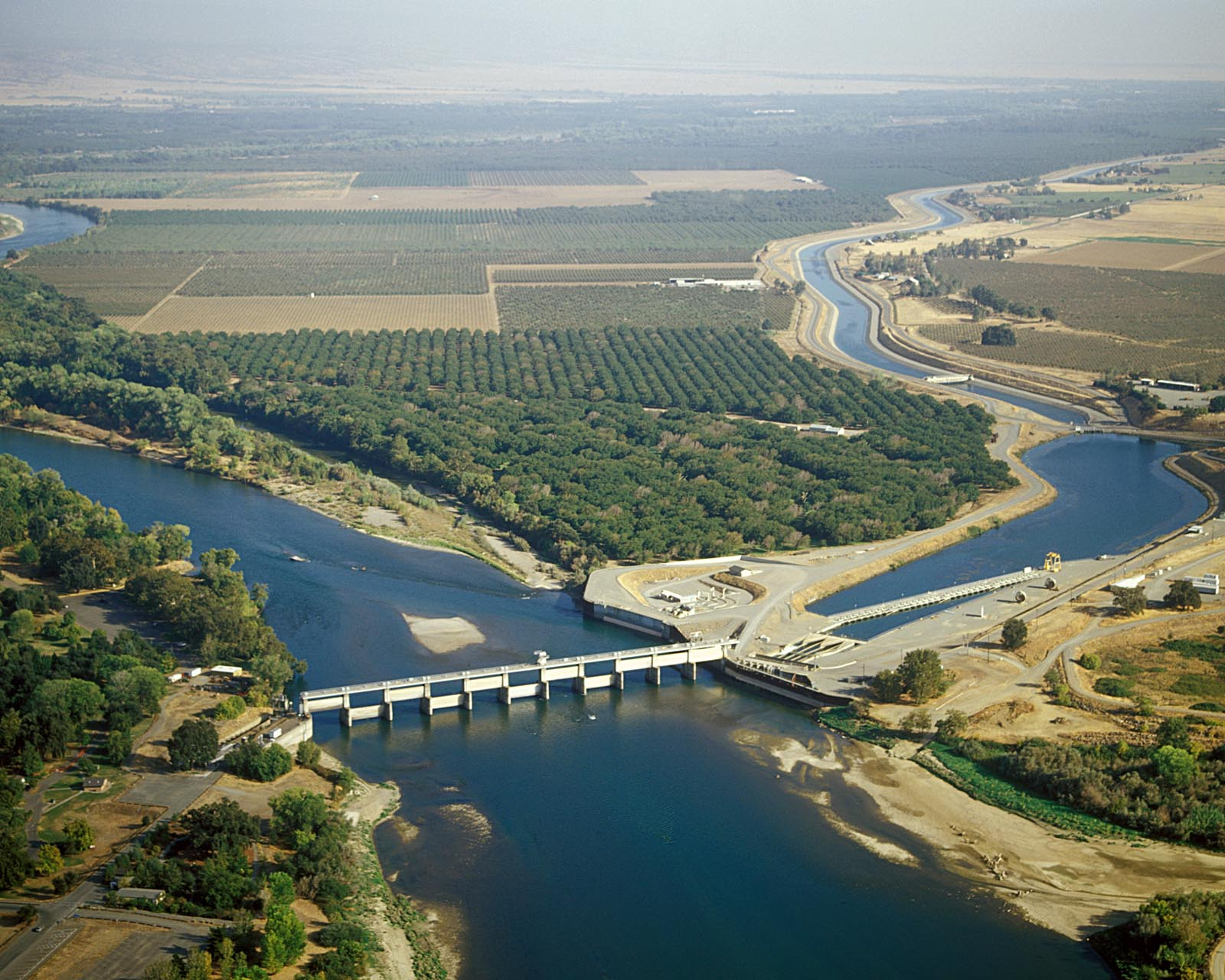
Red Bluff Diversion Dam, which sends Sacramento River water to a pair of irrigation canals near Red Bluff, posed a major barrier to fish movement and migration in the river until replaced with a pumping plant in 2013.

Located along the Pacific Flyway, the sprawling wetlands of the Sacramento Valley are an important stop for migratory birds; however, only a fraction of the historic wetlands remain. Seasonally flooded rice paddies in the Sacramento Valley comprise a large portion of the habitat currently used by migrating birds. Native bird populations have been declining steadily since the 19th century. Species that were once common but now are endangered or gone include the southwestern willow flycatcher, western yellow-billed cuckoo, least Bell's vireo, and warbling vireo. Another reason for dropping numbers are the introduction of non-native species, such as the parasitic cowbird, which lays its eggs in the nests of other bird species causing its hatchlings to compete with the others for food.

There were once 9 species of amphibians that used the Sacramento River, but some have become extinct and most other populations are declining due to habitat loss caused by agriculture and urban development. Amphibians originally thrived in the marshes, sloughs, side-channels and oxbow lakes because of their warmer water, abundance of vegetation and nutrients, lower predator populations and slower current. This population once included several species of frogs and salamanders; the foothill yellow-legged frog and western spadefoot are listed as endangered species.

Riparian and wetlands areas along the Sacramento once totaled more than 500,000 acres (2,000 km^{2}); today only about 10,000 acres (40 km^{2}) remains. Much of this consists of restored stretches and artificially constructed wetlands. Levee construction has prevented the river from changing course during winter and spring floods, which was crucial to the renewal of existing wetlands and the creation of new ones. Since the late 19th century the river has been mostly locked in a fixed channel, which once could shift hundreds of feet or even several miles in a year because of floods. In 2010, about 100 miles (160 km) of the river's riparian forests were undergoing restoration.

UC Davis initiated a project known as The Nigiri Project which takes place under the Yolo Bypass in the rice field floodplains adjacent to the Sacramento River. The name comes from a form of Japanese sushi which contains a slice of fish on top of a compressed wedge of vinegared rice. Salmon migrate from the Central Valley rivers to the ocean where they increase in size for one to three years then return to rivers to spawn, if a young fish is larger when they enter the ocean, they will have more of a chance to return for spawning. According to UC Davis Center for Watershed Sciences these rice fields adjacent to the Sacramento River will serve as potential nurseries for salmon. UC Davis also concluded from past experimental releases of salmon, that the Yolo Bypass floodway could have up to 57,000 acres of a productive breeding habitat with almost no cost to farmers. The Nigiri project has demonstrated off-season agriculture fields such as the rice fields under the Yolo Bypass next to Sacramento River can serve as an important floodplain habitat and feeding ground for juvenile or endangered fish. UC Davis noted juveniles grew much bigger and faster within the flooded rice fields when compared to those released in the Sacramento River. Public agencies, conservation groups and landowners have all been working together and conducting experiments since 2011. Experiments conducted on rice fields took place at the Knaggs Ranch property within the Yolo Bypass by Sacramento River for four consecutive winters. UC Davis shares their results produced the fastest growth of juvenile Chinook salmon in the Central Valley to ever be recorded. The Nigiri project attempted to see if these floodplains as surrogate wetlands which can be controlled to copy the Sacramento River system's annual natural flooding cycle the native fish depend on. Runoff water from agriculture is used to flood the fields for most of this experiment adjacent to the Sacramento River. The water is eventually flushed back into the Delta ecosystem through agricultural canals.

=== Anadromous fish ===
The Sacramento River fall chinook stock is the driver of commercial and recreational salmon fisheries off California and most of Oregon.

— Pacific Fishery Management Council, 2008

Current and historic range of winter chinook salmon

Second only to the Columbia River on the west coast of the United States in Chinook salmon runs, the Sacramento and its tributaries once supported a huge population of this fish. Millions of salmon once swam upstream to spawn in the Sacramento; as recently as 2002 eight hundred thousand fish were observed to return to the river. The Sacramento and San Joaquin River systems are home to the southernmost existing run of chinook salmon in North America.

Starting in the 20th century, dam construction blocked off hundreds of miles of salmon-spawning streams, such as the upper Feather and American Rivers, and the entirety of the Pit and upper Sacramento rivers. Pollution from farms and urban areas took a heavy toll on the river's environment, and heavy irrigation withdrawals sometimes resulted in massive fish kills. Since 1960, when the big pumps at the head of the California Aqueduct in the Delta began their operation, the pattern of water flow in the Delta has been changed considerably leaving the fish confused as to where to go, resulting in many generations dying off because they have not been able to find their way upstream. In 2004, only 200,000 fish were reported to return to the Sacramento; in 2008, a disastrous low of 39,000.

In 1999, five hydroelectric dams on Battle Creek, a major tributary of the Sacramento River, were removed to allow better passage of the fish. Three other dams along the creek were fitted with fish ladders. The river is considered one of the best salmon habitats in the watershed because of its relatively cold water and the availability of ideal habitat such as gravel bars.

By the late 20th and early 21st centuries, the government blamed crashing fish populations on overfishing, especially off the Northern California and Oregon coast, which lie directly adjacent to the migration paths of Sacramento River salmon. This has resulted in a ban on coastal salmon fishing for several years since 2002. The Red Bluff Diversion Dam, although not a large dam and equipped with fish passage facilities, also presents a major barrier. Because of inadequate design, roughly 25–40% of the incoming fish get blocked by the dam each year. The dam has also become a "favorite spot" for predatory fish to congregate, feasting on the salmon that get trapped both above and below the dam. As of 2010, the salmon run has shown slight signs of improvement, probably because of that year's greater precipitation.

In 1995, a gate on the Folsom Dam on the American River broke open, causing the river's flow to rise by some 40,000 cubic feet per second (1,100 m^{3}/s). The water traveled down the Sacramento and washed into the Pacific; the influx of fresh water was such that it confused thousands of anadromous fish to begin migrating up the river, thinking that the river had risen because of late-autumn storms.

=== Whales ===
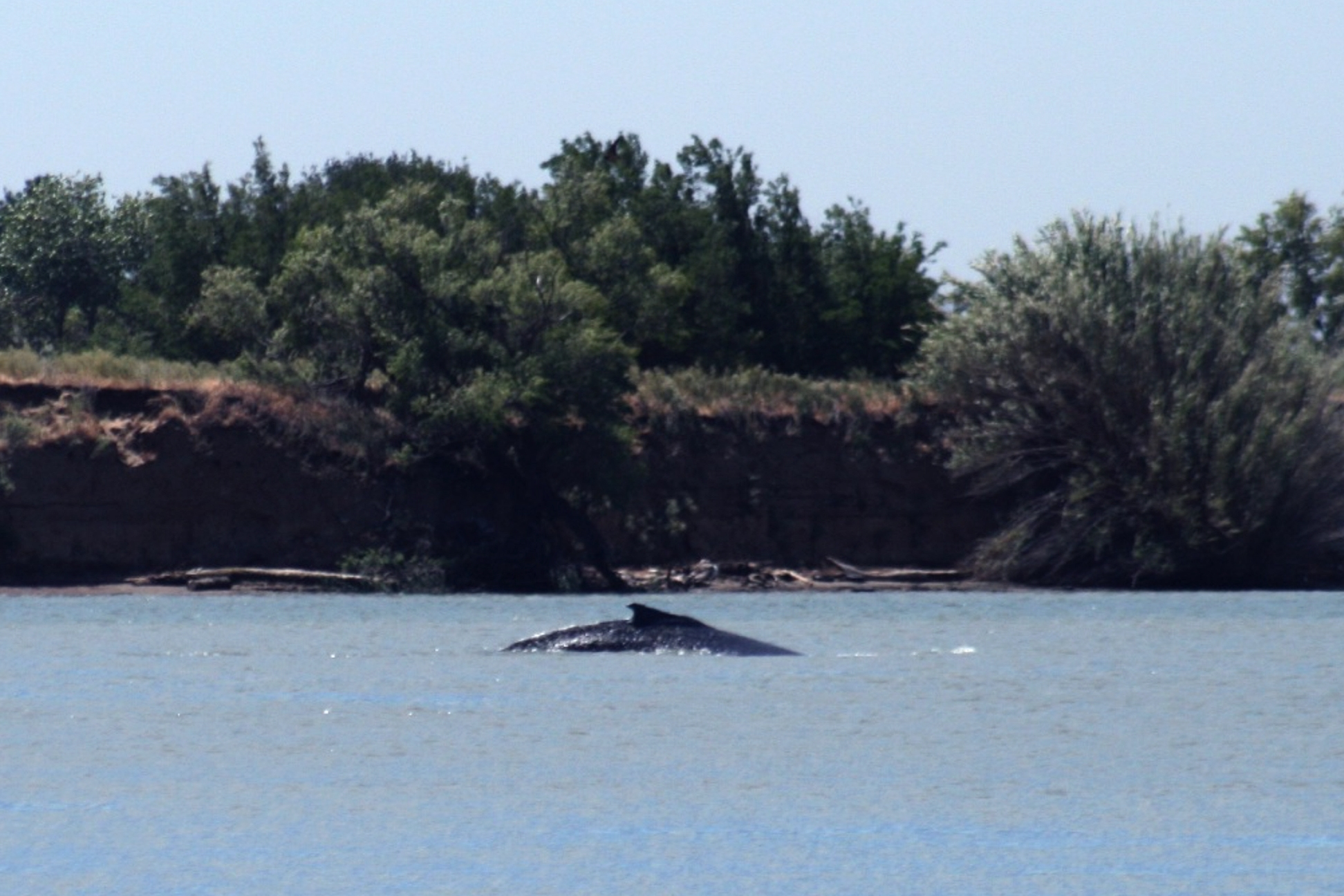
Delta the Whale in the Sacramento River

Whales are occasionally found far inland after navigating the river for food or refuge and then losing track of how to get back to the Pacific Ocean. In October 1985 a humpback whale affectionately named "Humphrey the humpbacked whale" by television media traveled 69 miles (111 km) up the Sacramento River before being rescued. Rescuers downstream broadcast sounds of humpback whales feeding to draw the whale back to the ocean.

On May 14, 2007, onlookers and media spotted two humpback whales traveling the deep waters near Rio Vista. The duo, generally believed to be mother and calf (Delta, the mother and Dawn, her calf), continued to swim upstream to the deep water ship channel near West Sacramento, about 90 miles (140 km) inland. There was concern because the whales had been injured, perhaps by a boat's propeller or keel, leaving a gash in each whale's skin. The whales were carefully inspected by biologists and injected with antibiotics to help prevent infection. After days of efforts to lure (or frighten) the whales in the direction of the ocean, the whales eventually made their way south into San Francisco Bay, where they lingered for several days. By May 30, 2007, the cow and calf apparently slipped out unnoticed under the Golden Gate Bridge into the Pacific Ocean, likely under cover of night.

=== Sea lions ===
Recently, sea lions have been found traveling far up the Sacramento in search of nutrient rich salmon. These individuals tend to be young males looking to bulk up before breeding season. The recent boom of sea lion sightings in the river has been attributed to the passage of the Marine Mammal Protection Act in 1972, leading to a resurgence in sea lion populations, requiring the species to expand its range.

Common locations to spot sea lions are underneath the Tower Bridge, the mouth of the Feather River, and the confluence of the Sacramento and American River at Discovery Park.

=== Pollution ===
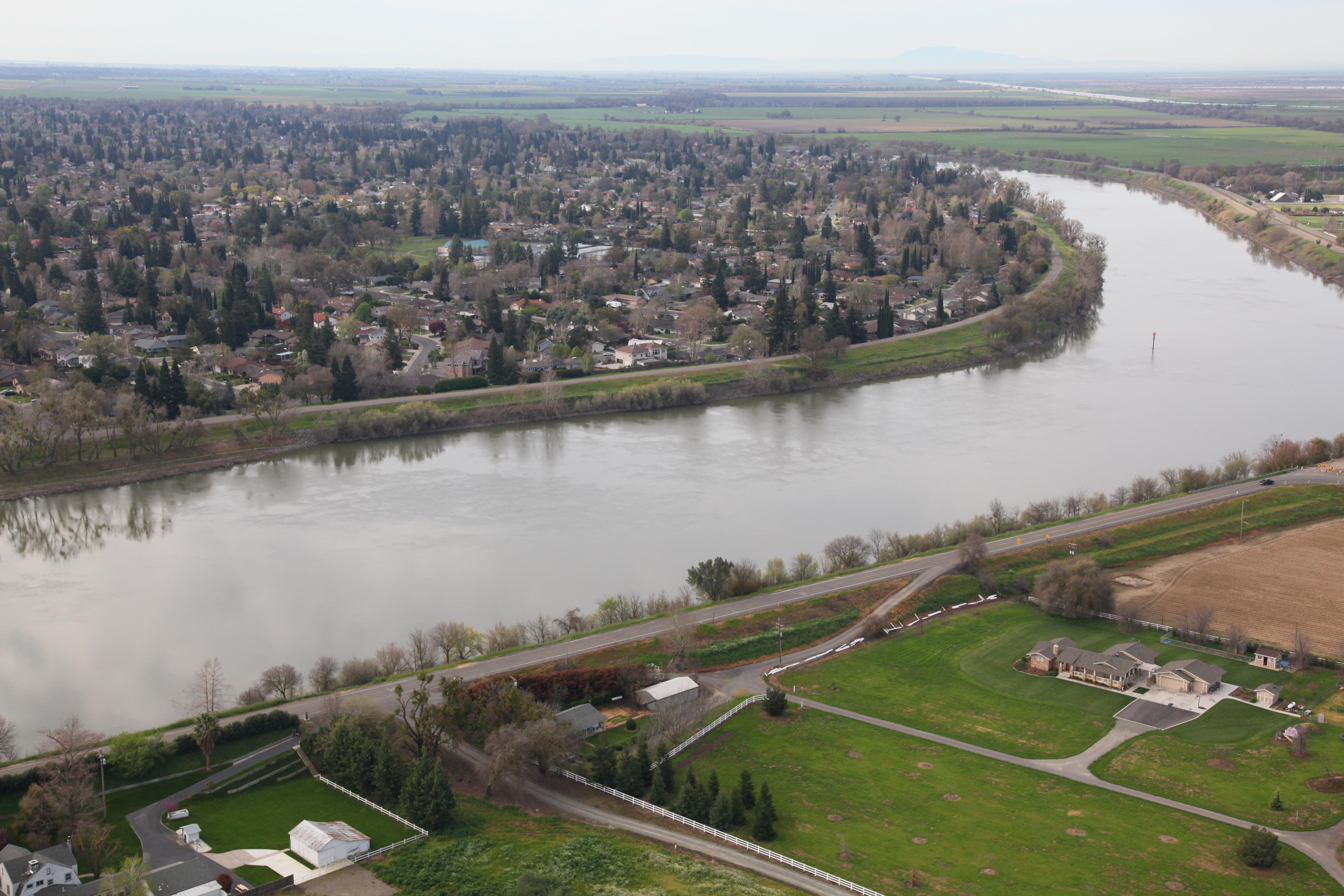
Sacramento River flowing through the Sacramento suburbs

For a river of its size, the Sacramento is considered to have fairly clean water. However, pollutants still flow into the river from many of its tributaries and man-made drains or channels. Pesticide runoff, especially DDT, is one of the largest problems faced today, because of the valley's primarily agricultural economy. Increased erosion caused by the removal of riparian vegetation and the runoff of fertilizers into the river have led to occasional algae blooms, though the water is usually cold because of the regulation of dams upstream. Other pollutant sources include urban runoff, mercury and even rocket fuel that was reported to have leaked near the American River from an Aerojet extraction project.

Mercury pollution created by mining and processing activities during the California Gold Rush still has a profound impact on the Sacramento River's environment. According to Domagalski of the USGS, Mercury is currently considered the most serious water-quality problem in the Sacramento River. Mercury is unique because it is the heaviest liquid in existence, it is the only heavy metal that is a liquid at room temperature and it readily vaporizes into the atmosphere. The toxic substance was widely used by miners to separate gold from the surrounding rocks and dirt, and was disposed of by allowing it to evaporate. Most of the mercury was mined in the Coast Ranges to the west of the Sacramento River; mines in these mountains produced roughly 140,000 tons of mercury to serve the Gold Rush. When the gold rush ended, most of the mines were closed but toxic acidic water and chemicals continue to leak from within, into west-side Sacramento tributaries such as Cache Creek and Putah Creek. According to the Sacramento Watershed River Program, an abandoned mercury mine, which is currently an EPA superfund site, is located in the Cache Creek area in the Sacramento River, called the Sulfur Bank Mercury Mine, which is still releasing mercury with leachate into Clear Lake which is close by. This site along with other former mine sites add to the contamination of Cache Creek which is estimated to be responsible for 50% of mercury taken to the Bay Delta area every year. In the east, mercury that permeated into the ground has contaminated several aquifers that feed rivers such as the Feather, Yuba and American. Even the evaporated mercury posed problems – so much of it was used that significant concentrations still linger in the air in many places. According to Griffin with the Sacramento Water Action Team, Mercury cannot naturally escape or dissipate and will be brought down into the soils and sediment to pollute and react with, in some of these cases methane can be produced from the mercury which will contribute to the greenhouse gases and is another contributing issue with mercury pollution, ecological alteration of the Sacramento River and climate change. Griffin shares, "Mercury and its compounds readily attach to particulate material in soil and sediment. In the presence of living organisms ionic mercury can transform into monomethylmercury and dimethylmercury. When exposed to sunlight the (di)methylmercury is photodegraded to monomethyl mercury, usually near the surface of water, and methane gas is released". According to the USGS 2016, the mercury release leaves a permanent imprint not only in the Sacramento River Watershed but also in peat bogs, snowcapped glaciers and sediments up to hundreds and thousands of miles away. Mercury pollution continues today and will probably continue for decades or centuries into the future.

Another form of pollution the Sacramento River is suffering from is plastic pollution. According to researchers from University of California Berkeley, they recorded over 7 trillion microplastics being deposited in the San Francisco Bay each year with the Sacramento River being a major contributor. They also found microplastics in one fourth of anchovy, striped bass and salmon stomachs in the Bay Area.

In July 1991, a train derailed near Dunsmuir, California alongside the Sacramento River. A tank car split open, spilling about 19,500 gallons of the pesticide metam sodium into the river. The chemical formed a stinking, bubbling, green glob that moved 45 miles (72 km) down the river, killing everything in its path. More than one million fish were killed, including at least 100,000 rainbow trout, and thousands of other aquatic creatures as well as nearby trees. Next, the green glob entered Shasta Lake, California's largest reservoir. Fortunately, a system of aerating pipes at the bottom of the lake had been set up to dissipate the chemical, reducing it to almost nothing by the 29th, preventing further environmental destruction. The tank car carrying the metam sodium through California was of a type that the National Transportation Safety Board said had "a high incidence of failure" in accidents. Furthermore, the tank car was not labeled, so the train's crew was unaware of the danger posed by the chemical.

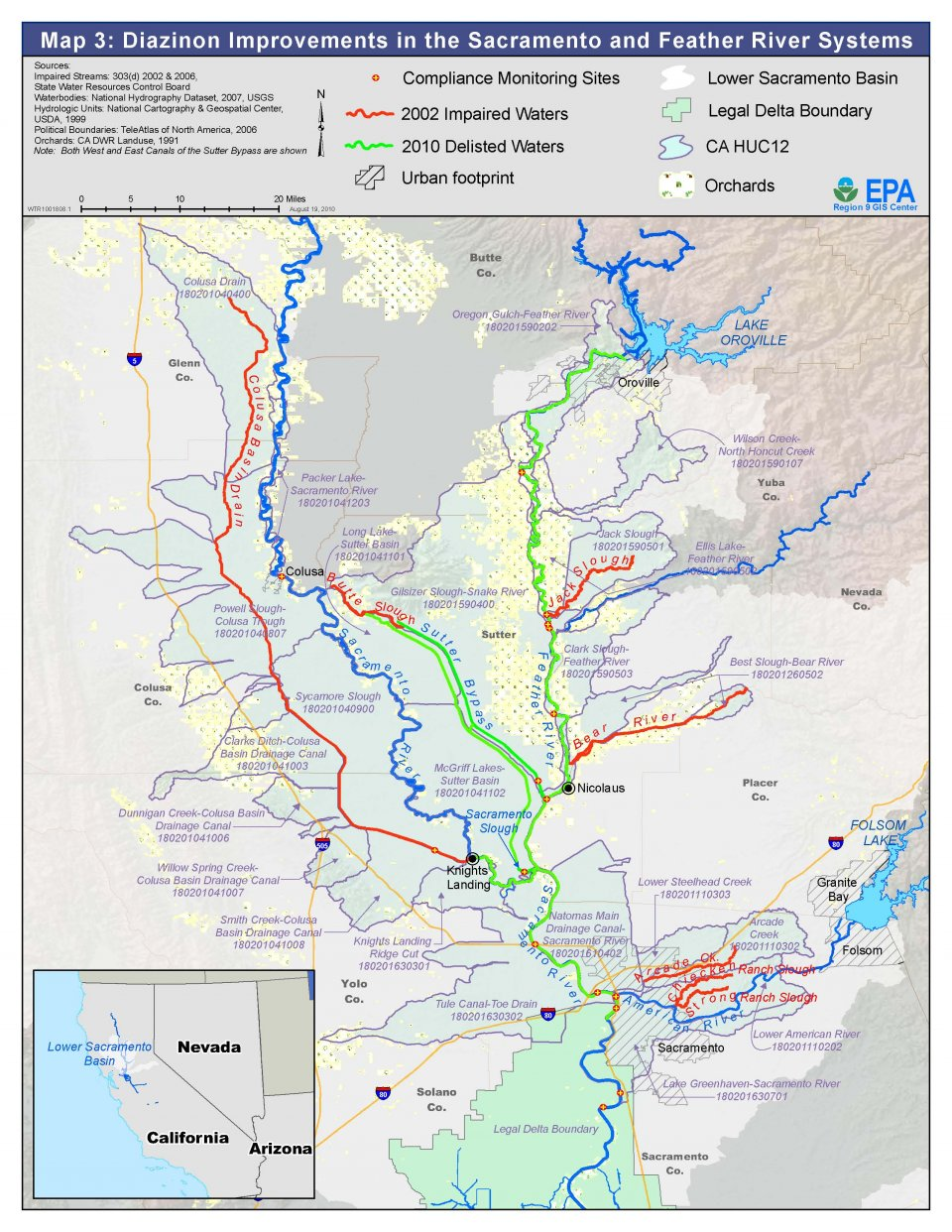
Improvement in water quality throughout the Sacramento and Feather River through the reduction of diazinon concentrations

Diazinon was a major pollution problem in the Sacramento River which would originate from agricultural and urban storm water discharges. Diazinon is used for orchards which grow peaches, plums, and almonds to mitigate the number of insects and pests like spider mites and aphids. A wide variety of organizations and groups came together to reduce diazinon concentrations in the Sacramento and Feather River systems. Their collaboration and hard work led to the removal of 79 river miles from the 303(d) list for diazinon impairments in 2010 according to the Environmental Protection Agency.

== See also ==
- Auburn Dam
- Bass Festival
- Blue Tent Creek
- Delta Dawn
- List of crossings of the Sacramento River
- List of rivers of California
- United States Exploring Expedition
