= Blue Tent Creek =

Stream in California, U.S.

Coordinates: 40.2058°N 122.2158°W

Blue Tent Creek is a stream in the U.S. state of California. The stream flows for 9.5 miles (15.3 km) before it empties into the Sacramento River.

Two traditions attempt to explain the name "Blue Tent Creek": firstly, it may derive its name from the blue tent of a local prospector; secondly that it was named after a blue tent which was a landmark on a local stagecoach route.
