= San Luis Dam =

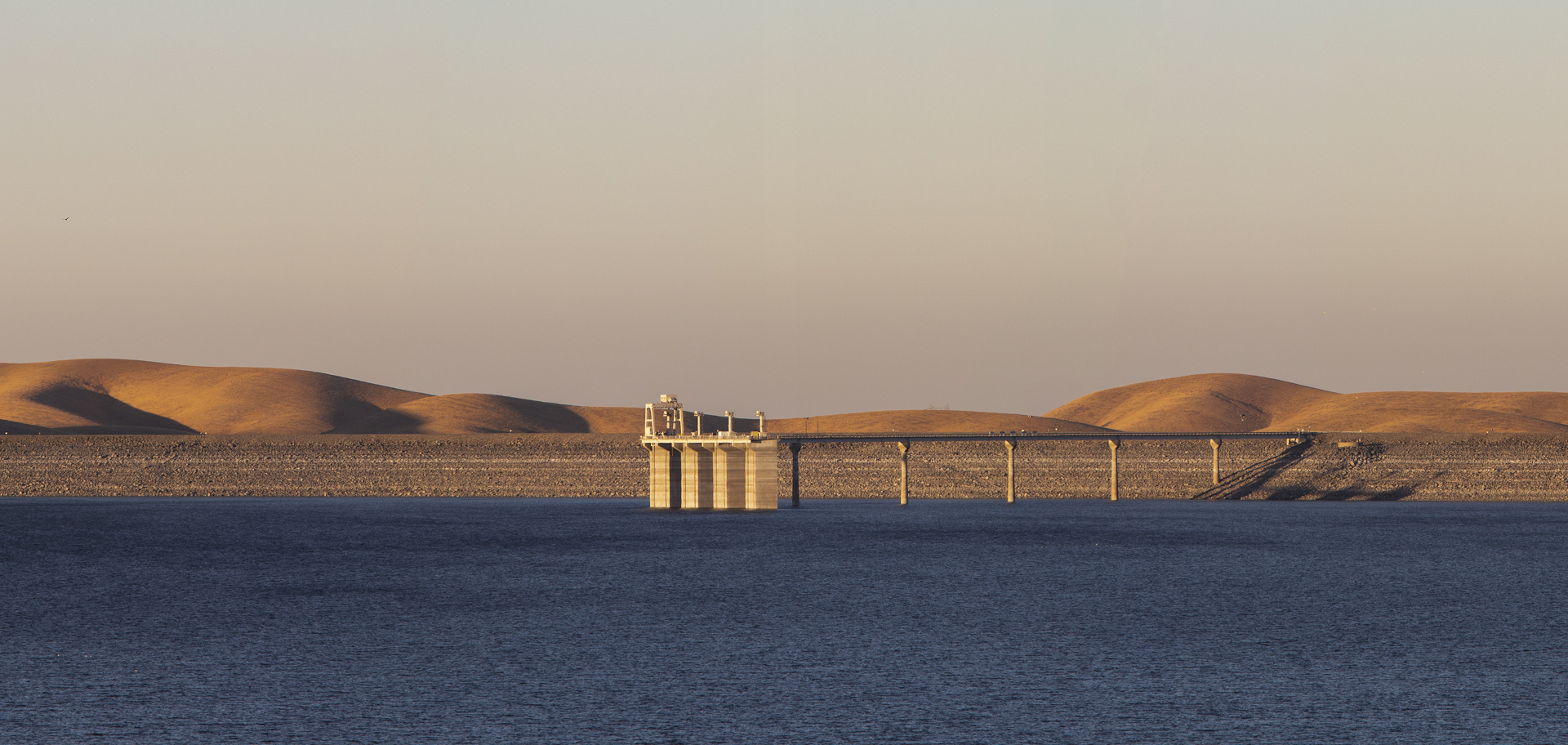
- View of San Luis Dam and the intake structure.
- Interactive map of San Luis Dam
- Country: United States
- Location: Merced County, California
- Coordinates: 37°03′33″N 121°04′29″W
- Construction began: 1963; 63 years ago
- Opening date: 1968; 58 years ago
- Owners: U.S. Bureau of Reclamation and California Department of Water Resources

Dam and spillways
- Type of dam: Embankment
- Height (foundation): 382 ft (116 m)
- Length: 18,600 ft (5,700 m)
- Dam volume: 77,656,000 yd^{3} (59,372,000 m^{3})

Reservoir
- Creates: San Luis Reservoir
- Total capacity: 2,041,000 acre⋅ft (2.518 km^{3})
- Catchment area: 82.6 mi^{2} (214 km^{2})
- Surface area: 12,700 acres (5,100 ha)
- Normal elevation: 544 ft (166 m)

William R. Gianelli Powerplant
- Commission date: 1968
- Type: Pumping-generating
- Hydraulic head: 323 ft (98 m) max
- Turbines: 8 x 53.0 MW Francis turbines
- Installed capacity: 424 MW

San Luis Dam, also known as B.F. Sisk Dam, is a major earth-filled dam in Merced County, California, which forms San Luis Reservoir, the largest off-stream reservoir in the United States. The dam and reservoir are located in the Diablo Range to the east of Pacheco Pass and about 10 miles (16 km) west of Los Banos. San Luis Dam, a jointly owned state and federal facility, stores more than 2 million acre-feet (2.5 km^{3}) of water for the California State Water Project and the federal Central Valley Project. Although the dam is located in the valley of San Luis Creek, the majority of its water comes from man-made aqueducts which are supplied from other rivers in Northern California.

San Luis provides water mainly for irrigation in the San Joaquin Valley, where it augments the supply for more than 1 million acres (400,000 ha) of agricultural land, although some water is also used for urban and environmental uses. The dam was built between 1963 and 1968, and filled for the first time in 1969. It provides flexibility to the state water system by capturing, via pumps and canals, the wet season (November–April) runoff that would otherwise flow from the Sacramento–San Joaquin River Delta into the Pacific Ocean. It also generates hydroelectricity by releasing the water when it is needed. However, it has indirectly impacted the environment by enabling increased water diversion from sensitive estuary regions. In recent years, a combination of drought and pumping restrictions enacted to protect endangered fish have contributed to low water levels at the San Luis Reservoir.

The dam and reservoir are visible from the Romero Overlook Visitors Center, which is located along Highway 152 traversing Pacheco Pass.

== Overview ==
San Luis Reservoir is designed to capture excess runoff flowing out of the Sacramento–San Joaquin River Delta, the largest watershed of California, during the winter and spring rainy season so it can be used during the dry season. This water includes both natural river flows, and water that is evacuated from Shasta Lake, Lake Oroville, Folsom Lake and other reservoirs for flood control purposes. This is accomplished via a system of canals and pumping stations which divert water from the Delta and deliver it south to water users.

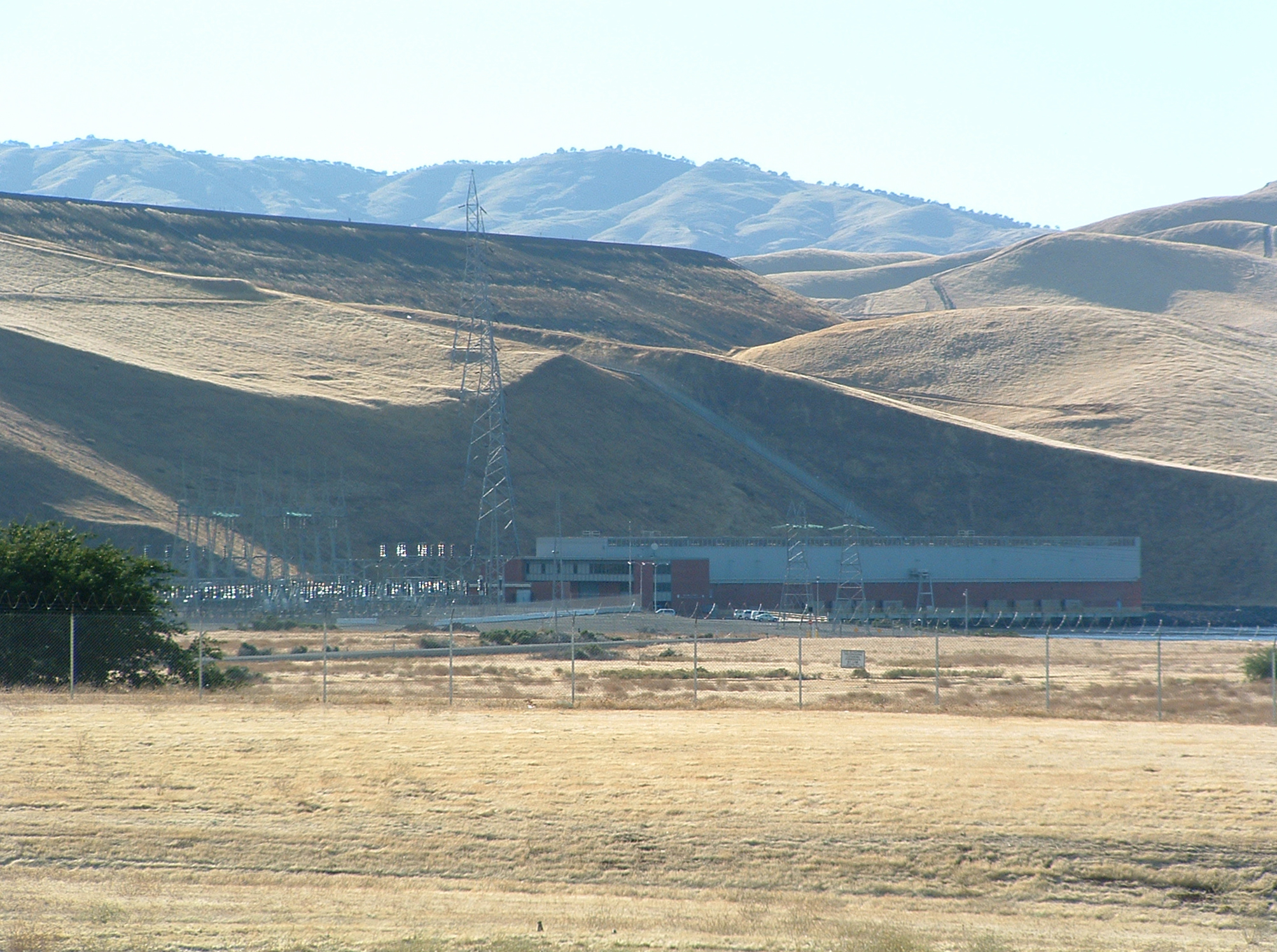
A view of the William R. Gianelli Powerhouse, with part of the San Luis Dam embankment visible above it.

The San Luis Dam, a zoned compacted earthfill structure, is one of the largest embankment dams in the United States, with a structural height of 382 feet (116 m), a length of 18,600 feet (5,700 m) and a structural volume of 77,656,000 cubic yards (59,372,000 m^{3}). When full, San Luis Reservoir is more than 300 feet (91 m) deep, covers 12,700 acres (5,100 ha), and contains 2,041,000 acre-feet (2.518 km^{3}) of water. The storage capacity of San Luis Reservoir is divided with 55 percent belonging to the state and 45 percent to the federal government.

The Delta-Mendota Canal, originally built in 1951, carries irrigation water for the federal Central Valley Project (CVP) operated by the U.S. Bureau of Reclamation to supply San Joaquin Valley farms. The California Aqueduct was built in 1968 as part of the State Water Project (SWP), to deliver water to Los Angeles and other cities and farmlands in Southern California. Both canals begin at the Clifton Court Forebay near Tracy, California where the Jones and Banks Pumping Plants draw water from the Delta in order to deliver it south. The canals are linked to O'Neill Forebay, a small reservoir located directly in front of San Luis Dam where the water is temporarily stored for distribution. Most CVP project water is dedicated to irrigation while the SWP water supply is split, with 30 percent going to agriculture and 70 percent to urban areas.

The San Luis Pumping-Generating Plant (also known as the William R. Gianelli Power Plant) is situated between the O'Neill and San Luis Reservoirs. It can pump water uphill for storage in San Luis during periods of low demand, which can then be released during periods of high demand. The sale of peaking power lowers the overall cost of operating the State Water Project, particularly the giant electric pumps along the California Aqueduct. However, due to friction losses when pumping water uphill, only about 70 percent of the energy can be recouped when the water is discharged.

The plant has eight reversible Francis turbine units which can generate up to 424 megawatts when releasing water. The power consumption while pumping is 376 megawatts. The maximum water flow while generating is 13,120 cubic feet per second (372 m^{3}/s), and maximum pumping is 11,000 cubic feet per second (310 m^{3}/s). A short 230 kV power line heads eastward to deliver this electricity to Northern California's electricity backbone, Path 15.

== History ==
The valley filled by the San Luis Reservoir was originally inhabited by the Yokuts people. During the early 19th century, the valley was part of Rancho San Luis Gonzaga, and small-scale agriculture began in the area, supplied by groundwater and canals from the San Joaquin River.

The Central Valley Project was begun in the 1930s to provide an additional water supply to the area, and greatly expanded the irrigated acreage. However, the lack of local water storage limited the system's flexibility. During the dry summer months when surface water was frequently unavailable, farmers pumped vast volumes of groundwater to irrigate their crops, considerably depleting the regional aquifer. The federal Bureau of Reclamation recognized the need for a large storage reservoir in order to provide a year-round water supply, and began studies for that project in 1955.

During the 1950s, the State of California also began building its own water project, whose design also required an off-stream water storage reservoir. The state approached the federal government with an offer to design a joint-use facility; however it took several years for the Bureau of Reclamation to agree to the proposal. On May 16, 1960, the state and the Bureau of Reclamation signed a "coordinated operation" agreement which laid out plans for the construction of joint-use facilities, including the San Luis Dam and Power Plant. The state government was to cover 55 percent of the cost with the federal government providing the rest. On June 3, 1960, President Dwight D. Eisenhower signed an act authorizing the San Luis Unit Project.

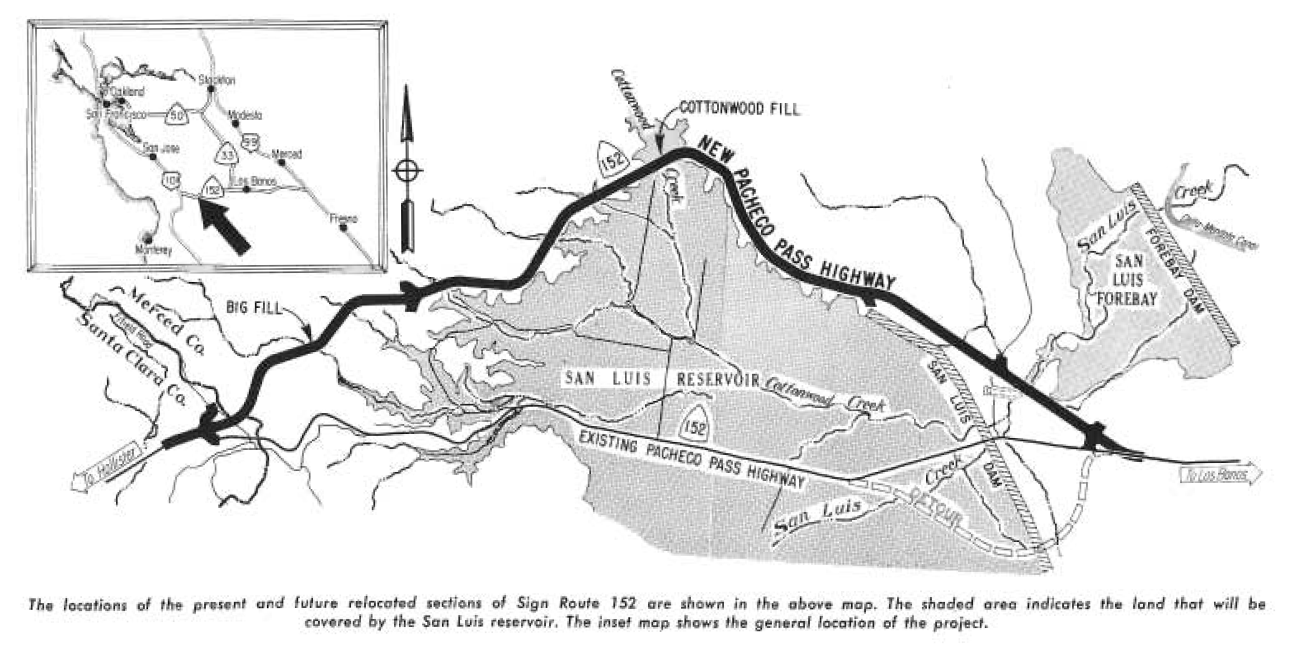
Map showing the realignment of Highway 152 around the San Luis Reservoir in 1963. The former roadbed is now under water.

Plans for the dam were completed by 1961 and the groundbreaking ceremony took place on August 18, 1962. In front of a crowd of 15,000 people, President John F. Kennedy and California Governor Pat Brown gave the signal to detonate the first explosive charges in the San Luis dam site. Work began the same month to reroute Pacheco Pass Highway (today's SR 152) around the future reservoir basin.

Construction of San Luis Dam lasted from 1963 to early 1968. The primary contract for the dam itself was awarded to Morrison-Knudsen, Utah Construction & Mining Co., and Brown & Root in 1963 for $85.9 million. Alfred M. Petrofsky held the role of chief engineer. The dam was constructed in several zones with quarried local earth and rock averaging as much as 130,000 cubic yards (99,000 m^{3}) per day. The 100-ton Caterpillar dump trucks used during construction were, at the time, the largest in the US. The construction of the four water intake towers, each 284 feet (87 m) high, involved the first use of tower cranes in the US. The work force peaked at 2,304 in October 1965 and declined thereafter.

In January 1968, with construction almost completed, the first water was delivered through the California Aqueduct to begin filling the giant reservoir. The dam was officially dedicated on April 20, 1968 by Interior Secretary Stewart L. Udall, who had also attended the groundbreaking ceremony in 1962. The San Luis Reservoir was completely filled for the first time on May 31, 1969.

In 1981, during low water conditions in San Luis Reservoir, a 1,100-foot (340 m) long segment of the upstream face of the dam partially collapsed, causing 400,000 cubic yards (310,000 m^{3}) of material to fall into the reservoir. Since the reservoir was at a low level the dam was in no immediate danger of failure, however it could not be safely refilled until the damage was repaired. By August 1982, the area had been stabilized with 1,400,000 cubic yards (1,100,000 m^{3}) of additional fill (known as a "buttressing berm"), at a cost of $6.1 million. In July 1984 another crack appeared in the dam, but it soon stabilized.

== Water supply ==
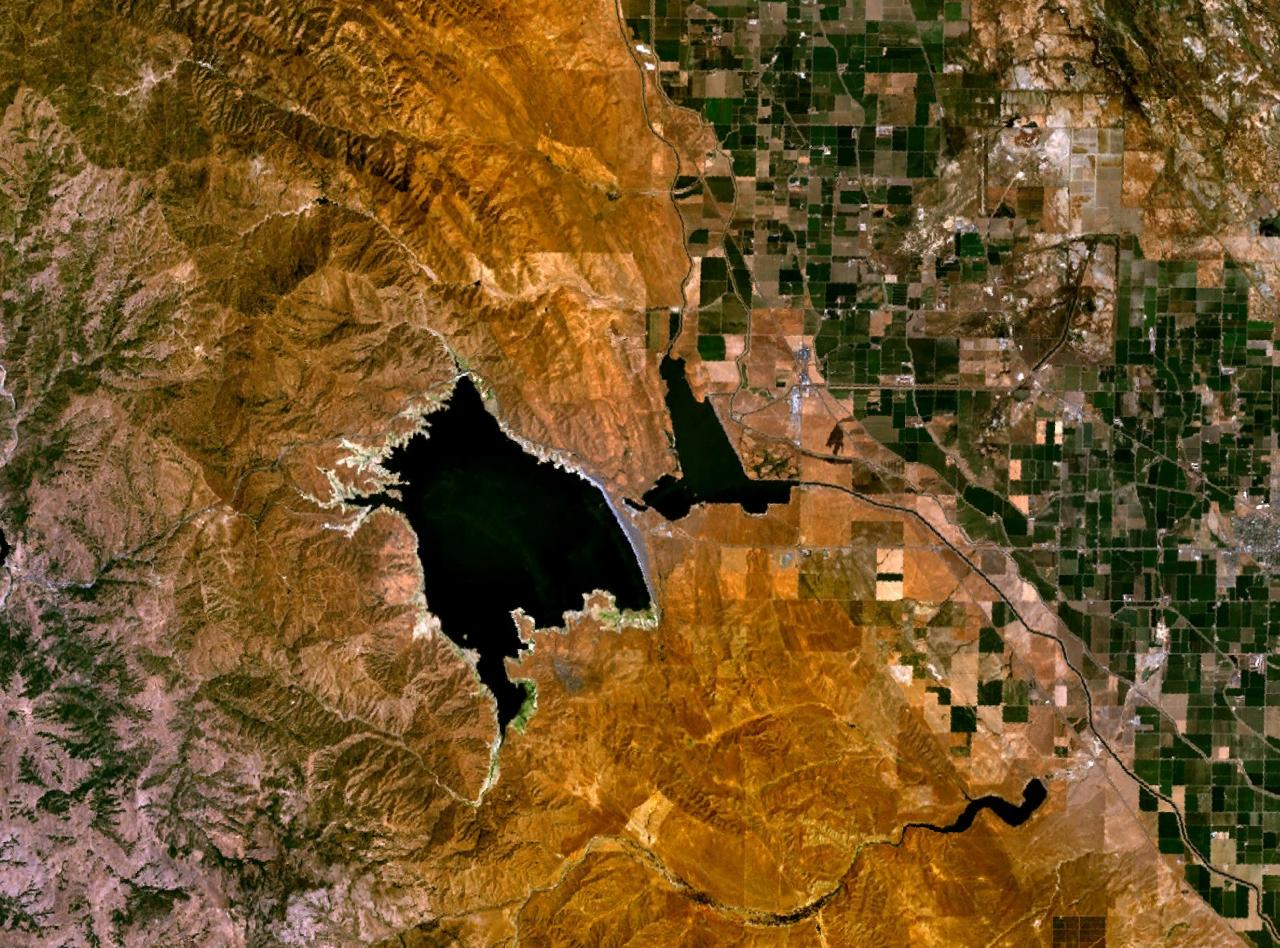
San Luis Reservoir, O'Neill Forebay and San Joaquin Valley farmlands, seen from space.

Most of the water stored behind San Luis Dam is used for irrigation. The CVP share of the water is released down the Delta-Mendota Canal into the San Joaquin River, which provides water for 380,000 acres (150,000 ha) of farmland in the central part of the San Joaquin Valley. Parts of the CVP and SWP water supply the Westlands Water District of Fresno and Kings Counties, which irrigates up to 735,000 acres (297,000 ha) of land on the west side of the San Joaquin Valley. Prior to the construction of San Luis Dam and the joint use portion of the California Aqueduct (the San Luis Canal) this area depended entirely on groundwater. In 2016 the main crops grown here were almonds, tomatoes, pistachios and wheat. Most of the Westlands district consists of large corporate farms totaling hundreds if not thousands of acres. The SWP also provides more than 980,000 acre-feet (1.21 km^{3}) of water per year for farmers in Kern County.

San Luis Reservoir stores water for the Metropolitan Water District of Southern California (MWD) which is one of the primary providers of water for the Greater Los Angeles Area. This water reaches Southern California via the East and West Branches of the California Aqueduct. It also provides water for the Central Coast cities like San Luis Obispo and Santa Barbara via the Coastal Branch of the California Aqueduct. Local water agencies and irrigation districts are allowed to "bank" water in San Luis Reservoir for later use, by purchasing it during the rainy season at lower prices when it is not immediately needed. Regulations only allow such carryover storage when San Luis is not full, since state and federal water takes priority. Once the reservoir fills, any carryover water that has not been used is effectively "lost", i.e. transferred to the CVP and SWP supplies.

In addition to supplying the main CVP and SWP canals, San Luis Reservoir also supplies water to the Santa Clara Valley via the Pacheco Tunnel and Hollister Conduit, which travel under the Diablo Range. At the western end of the tunnel, the water is stored behind San Justo Dam, an earthfill dam completed in 1986. These facilities are all part of the San Felipe Division of the Central Valley Project.

The San Luis & Delta-Mendota Water Authority represents the 29 federal water contractors served by the San Luis Unit, consisting of a combined 2,100,000-acre (850,000 ha) service area in the San Joaquin and Santa Clara Valleys. The Authority operates the Federally owned portion of the San Luis Reservoir and water supply infrastructure.

== Environmental issues ==
Certain environmental restrictions have been in place since the 1990s to limit pumping during the spring Sacramento River chinook salmon run (March–April). Water pumping during certain times of the winter and early spring interferes with fish migration. The pumping changes the primary direction of water flow in the Delta from east–west to north–south, confusing the fish. Before San Luis Dam was built, most of the pumping from the Delta occurred during the summer when there is high demand for irrigation. The construction of San Luis Dam enabled the additional capture of winter flows that would otherwise be lost to the sea. The restrictions have led to frequent low water levels at San Luis Reservoir; in late summer 2016 it fell to 10 percent of capacity, the lowest since 1991.

These restrictions have been criticized by water agencies as too stringent, especially when California is in a long-term drought. During winter 2016 at least 180,000 acre-feet (220,000,000 m^{3}) of water was allowed to drain from the Delta into the Pacific instead of being pumped into San Luis Reservoir. In December 2016, Congress passed a bill allowing increased water pumping during times when fish are not at high risk. This generally allows more water to be stored at San Luis Reservoir. The bill requires daily monitoring of fish to ensure environmental laws are not violated, instead of relying on hard limits which may not match current conditions. California Senator Dianne Feinstein remarked that "the goal... is to run California's water system based on good science, not intuition."

== Proposed expansion ==
In 2013, the Bureau of Reclamation proposed raising the BF Sisk Dam by 20 feet (6.1 m) to create about 130,000 acre-feet (160,000,000 m^{3}) of extra storage capacity. An expanded reservoir could store more water in wet years to compensate for less water being pumped in dry years due to environmental restrictions. The project would cost $360 million and would also involve seismic upgrades to protect the dam from earthquakes. The dam expansion is one of several major water projects that could be funded, in part, by a $2.7 billion bond measure approved by California voters in 2014.

In 2023, the Department of the Interior and San Luis & Delta-Mendota Water Authority approved plans to raise the Dam by 10 feet to create 130,000 acre-feet of additional water storage. The $1 billion project is expected to be completed by 2032.

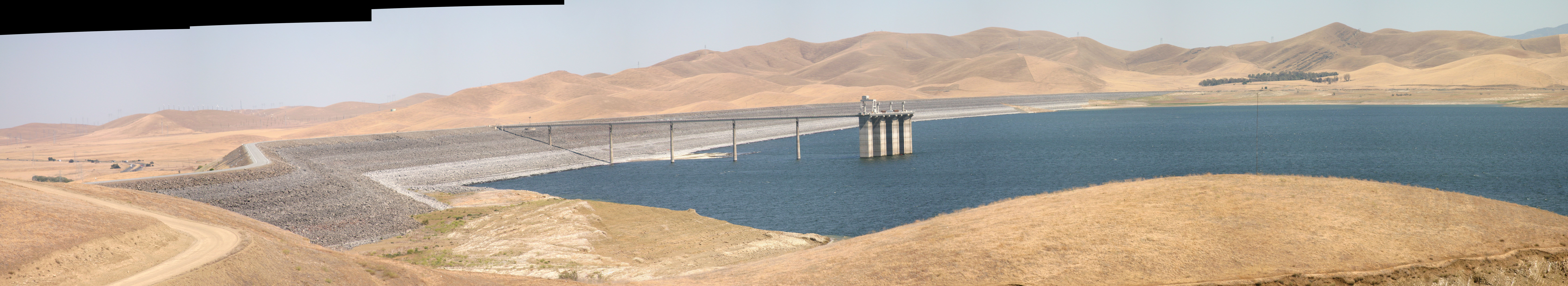
BF Sisk Dam and Reservoir seen from the Romero Overlook, June 2014.

== See also ==
- List of dams and reservoirs in California
- List of largest reservoirs of California
- List of power stations in California
- List of United States Bureau of Reclamation dams
- California Water Fix and Eco Restore
- Sites Reservoir
- Water in California
