= O'Neill Dam =

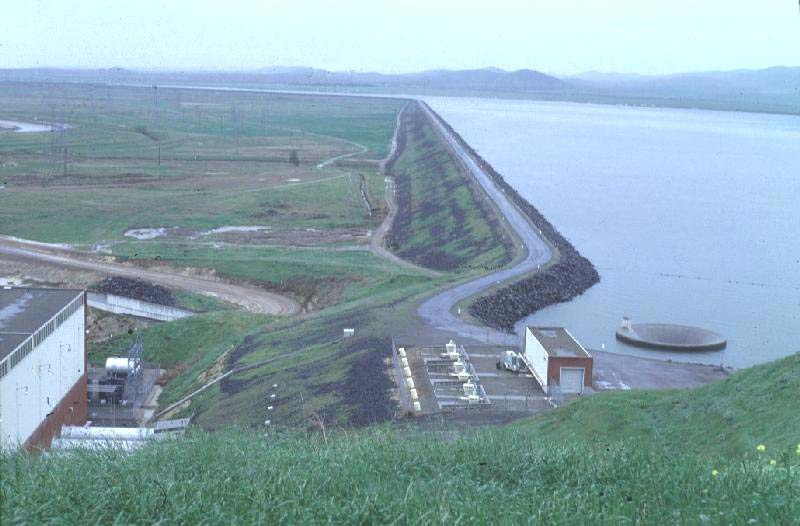
- O'Neill Forebay and Dam as seen from left bank.
- Interactive map of O'Neill Dam
- Official name: O'Neill Dam
- Location: Merced County, California, U.S.
- Coordinates: 37°04′50″N 121°02′50″W
- Construction began: 1963; 62 years ago
- Opening date: 1967; 58 years ago
- Operator: US Bureau of Reclamation

Dam and spillways
- Impounds: San Luis Creek
- Height: 87.5 ft (26.7 m)
- Length: 14,300 ft (4,400 m)
- Width (base): 124 ft (38 m)

Reservoir
- Creates: O'Neill Forebay
- Total capacity: 56,400 acre⋅ft (69,600 dam^{3})
- Catchment area: 18 mi^{2} (47 km^{2})
- Surface area: 2,250 acres (910 ha)

O'Neill Dam is an earthfill dam on San Luis Creek, 12 miles (19 km) west of Los Banos, California, United States, on the eastern slopes of the Pacific Coast Ranges of Merced County. Forming the O'Neill Forebay, a forebay to the San Luis Reservoir, it is roughly 2.5 miles (4.0 km) downstream from the San Luis Dam.

== Background ==
Built from 1963 to 1967, the dam is an earthfill and rockfill construction stretching over 3 miles (4.8 km) across the valley of San Luis Creek. At 87.5 feet (26.7 m) high, with a maximum reservoir depth of 57 feet (17 m), the crest of the dam is 14,300 feet (4,400 m) long, at an elevation of 223 feet (68 m). A morning-glory type spillway lies at the left bank of the reservoir, with a capacity of 3,250 ft^{3} (92 m^{3}) per second and a circumference of 641.5 ft (195.5 m).

== O'Neill Forebay reservoir ==
The O'Neill Forebay reservoir is fed by releases from the San Luis Dam as well as from the Delta–Mendota Canal. Water from the Delta–Mendota Canal is lifted a vertical distance of 8 feet (2.4 m) into a channel running 2,200 feet (670 m) into the forebay. The peak inflow to the forebay is 15,600 cubic feet (440 m^{3}) per second, from both the San Luis Dam and the Delta–Mendota Canal. Drainage area of the reservoir downstream of the San Luis Dam is only 18 acres (7.3 ha).

== O'Neill Pumping-Generating Plant ==
The O'Neill Pumping-Generating Plant produces 28 megawatts (38,000 hp). Irregular water releases from the San Luis Dam and William R. Gianelli Powerplant are collected in the reservoir of the O'Neill Dam, which has a capacity of 56,400 acre-feet (69,600 dam^{3}).

== See also ==
- List of dams and reservoirs in California
