= Stone Corral Creek =

Stone Corral Creek refers to three streams in California and one in Oregon:

- Stone Corral Creek (Colusa County, California)
- Stone Corral Creek (Napa County, California)
- Stone Corral Creek (Ventura County, California)
- Stone Corral Creek (Harney, Oregon)
