= Gianelli Power Plant =

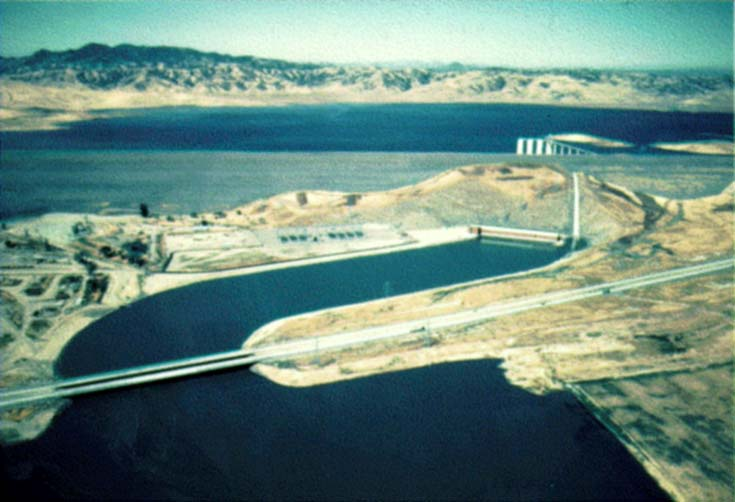
- Aerial photograph of the San Luis (William R. Gianelli) Power plant.
- Country: United States
- Location: Merced County, California
- Coordinates: 37°03′33″N 121°04′29″W
- Status: Operational
- Opening date: June 3, 1960
- Owner: State of California
- Operator: United States Bureau of Reclamation

Upper reservoir
- Creates: San Luis Reservoir
- Total capacity: 2,041,000 acre feet

Lower reservoir
- Creates: O'Neill Forebay
- Total capacity: 56,400 acre feet

Power Station
- Hydraulic head: 290 feet
- Pump-generators: 8
- Installed capacity: 424 MW
- Storage capacity: 126,352 MW·h
- Annual generation: 123,48 GW·h (2009); 311,54 GW·h (2012); 111,80 GW·h (2014)
- Website usbr.gov

The Gianelli Power Plant, also known as the San Luis Power Plant, is a pumped-storage hydroelectric plant that is at the base of the San Luis Dam in California. During the wet season, turbines pump water from the O'Neill Forebay into the reservoir, then when needed during the irrigation season, water flows from the reservoir back through the turbines and generates electricity. This is an unusual use of pumped storage where the intention is to capture irrigation water not to store power. Storage capacity delivers up to 298 hours of generation at full power.
