= Delta Cross Channel =

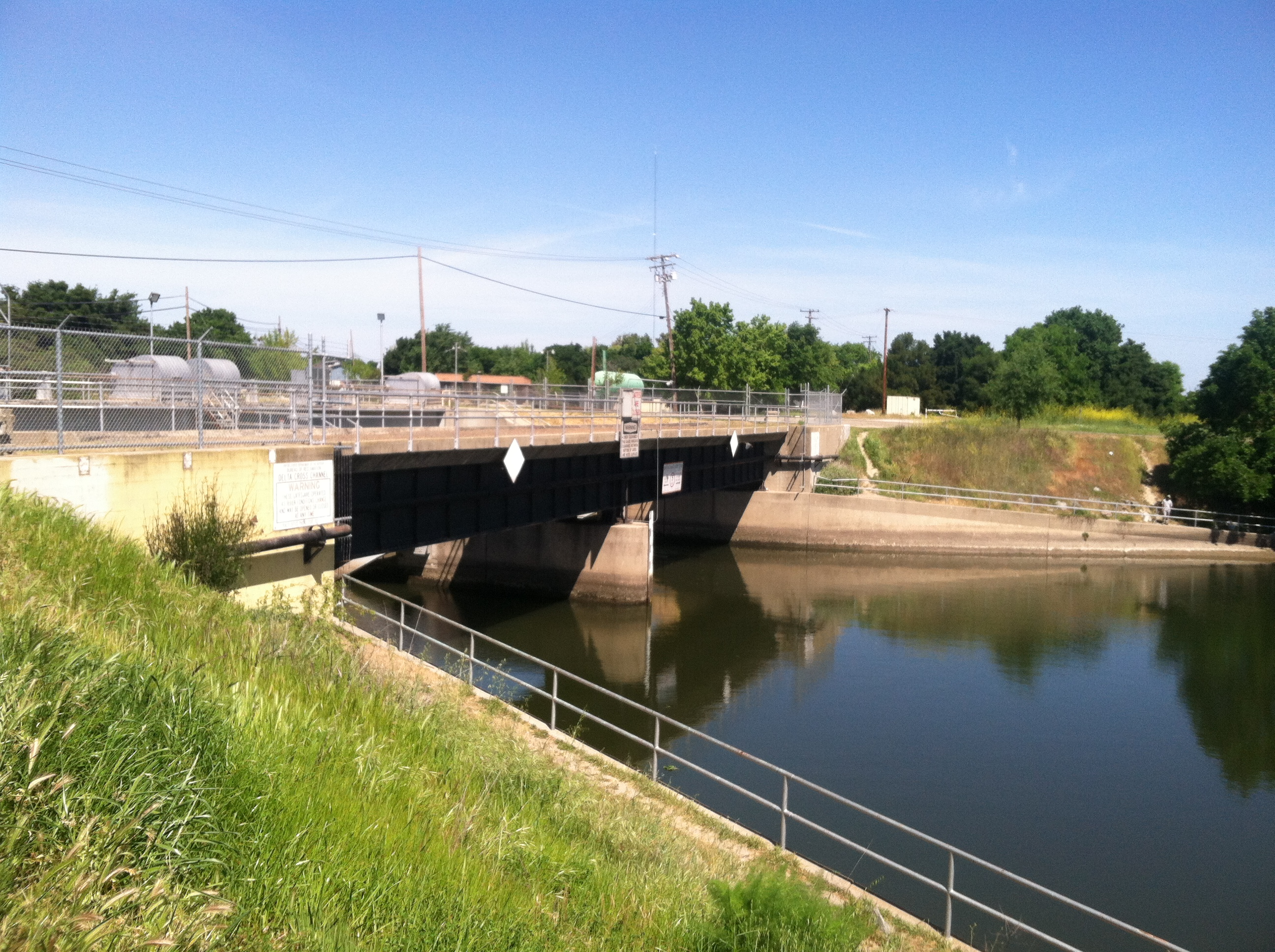
- The intake gates for the Delta Cross Channel

- Location within Sacramento-San Joaquin River Delta Location within California Location within the United States
- Interactive map of Delta Cross Channel
- Location: Walnut Grove, California
- Coordinates: 38°14′46″N 121°30′34″W
- Purpose: Divert water to the C.W. Bill Jones Pumping Plant as part of the Central Valley Project, control salinity, ensure irrigation supplies for the Sacramento-San Joaquin Delta
- Opening date: 1951

Dam and spillways
- Impounds: Sacramento River
- Width (base): 210 feet (64 m)

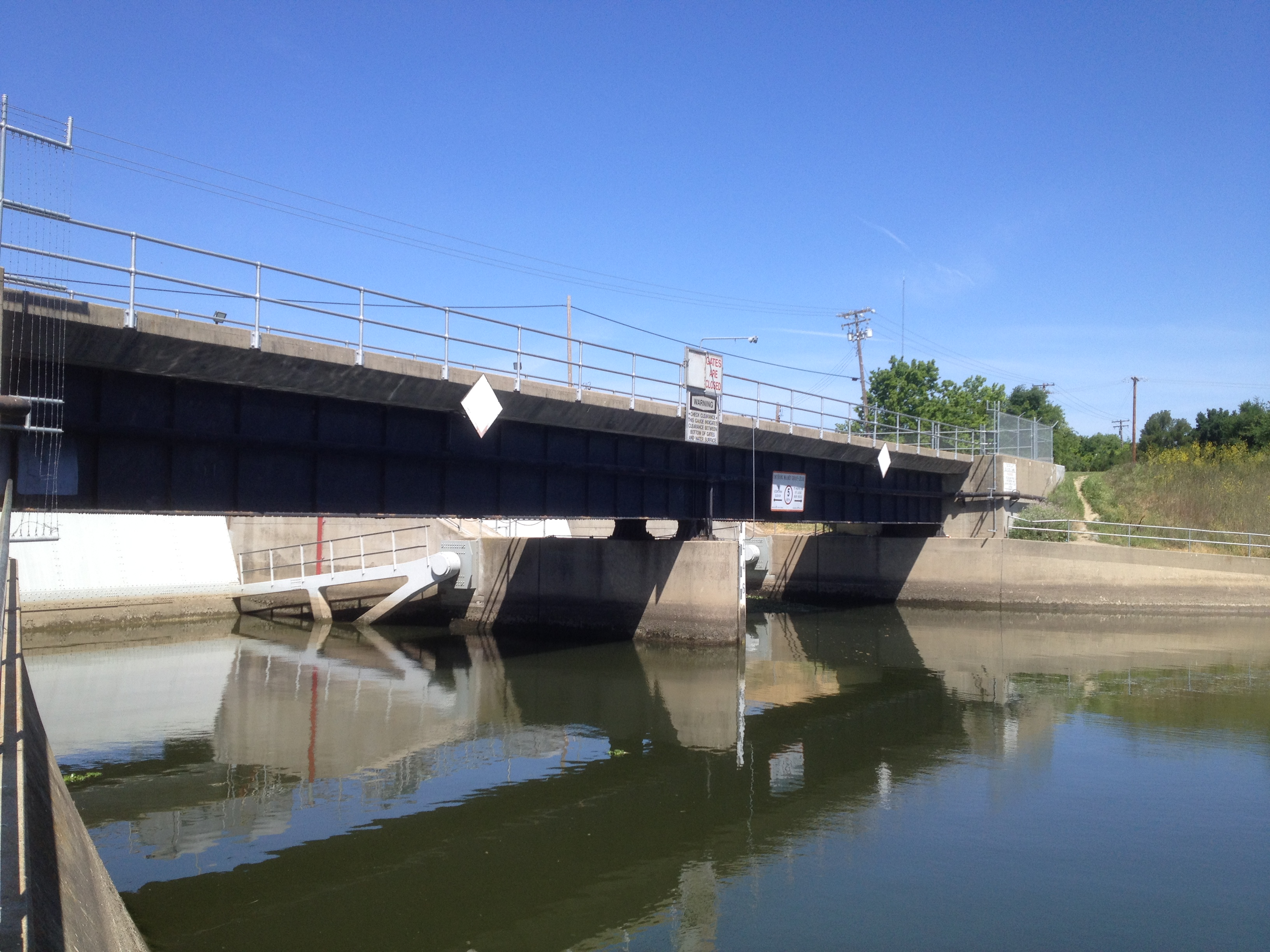
The sluice gates in the closed position

The Delta Cross Channel is a facility in California's Sacramento-San Joaquin Delta that diverts water from the Sacramento River. The facility was built in 1951 in Walnut Grove, California.

It diverts water to Snodgrass Slough, from where it flows to the Mokelumne River, then to the San Joaquin River, towards the C.W. Bill Jones Pumping Plant, which is the intake for the Delta-Mendota Canal, part of the Central Valley Project. The distance from the channel to the Jones Pumping Plant is about 50 miles (80 km).

== Operation ==
The diversion is controlled by two sluice gates that each measure 60 feet (18 m) by 30 feet (9.1 m) and weigh 243 tons and extend 243 feet (74 m) across the channel. The channel is 6,000 feet (1,800 m) long, has a bottom width of 210 feet (64 m), and was designed to divert a capacity of 3,500 cubic feet (99 m^{3}) of water per second under normal conditions, but can divert up to 6,000 ft^{3} (170 m^{3}) if required. The facility was built to augment the flow of the Sacramento River through the Delta to the Jones Pumping Plant. It ensures an adequate supply of water for the Jones Pumping Plant and irrigation supplies for the Sacramento-San Joaquin Delta while controlling ocean salinity.

The gates close when the river floods, specifically when the flow on the Sacramento River reaches 20,000 cubic feet (570 m^{3}) per second, to prevent flooding on the San Joaquin River, and if the amount of water is so low that the Central Valley Project cannot deliver water. The gates also close during the winter to protect the fisheries in the Delta, specifically the salmon fishery. The winter closure of the facility was requested by a consortium of wildlife protection agencies, including the U.S. Fish and Wildlife Service, the National Oceanic and Atmospheric Administration, and the California Department of Fish and Wildlife. The gates are generally open during the summer months.
