= O'Neill Forebay =

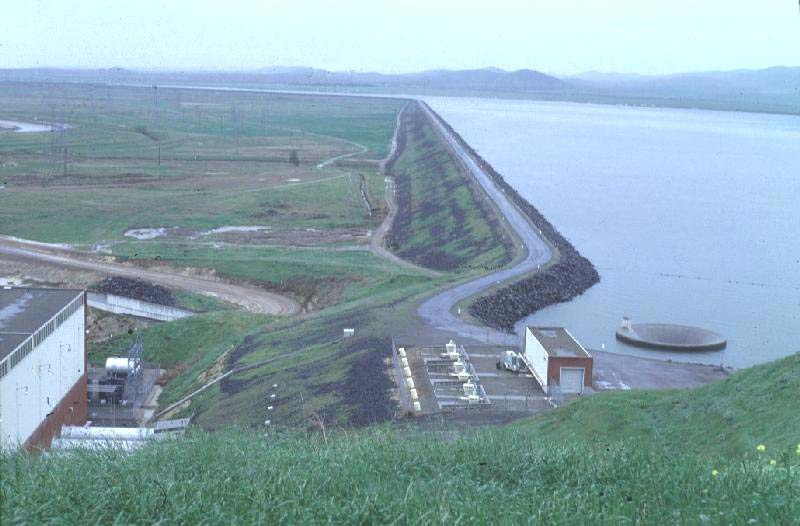
- O’Neill Forebay and Dam as seen from left bank

- Location within California
- Location: Merced County, California
- Coordinates: 37°05′00″N 121°02′33″W
- Type: Reservoir
- Primary inflows: California Aqueduct; Delta–Mendota Canal; San Luis Reservoir
- Primary outflows: California Aqueduct
- Catchment area: 18 acres (7.3 ha)
- Basin countries: United States
- Max. length: 3 km (1.9 mi)
- Max. width: 3 km (1.9 mi)
- Surface area: 2,250 acres (910 ha)
- Max. depth: 17 m (56 ft)
- Water volume: 56,400 acre-feet (69,600 dam^{3})
- Shore length^{1}: 19 km (12 mi)
- Surface elevation: 71 m (233 ft)
- References: U.S. Geological Survey Geographic Names Information System: O'Neill Forebay
- ^{1} Shore length is not a well-defined measure.

O'Neill Forebay is a forebay to the San Luis Reservoir created by the construction of O'Neill Dam across San Luis Creek approximately 12 miles (19 km) west of Los Banos, California, United States, on the eastern slopes of the Pacific Coast Ranges of Merced County.

== Background ==
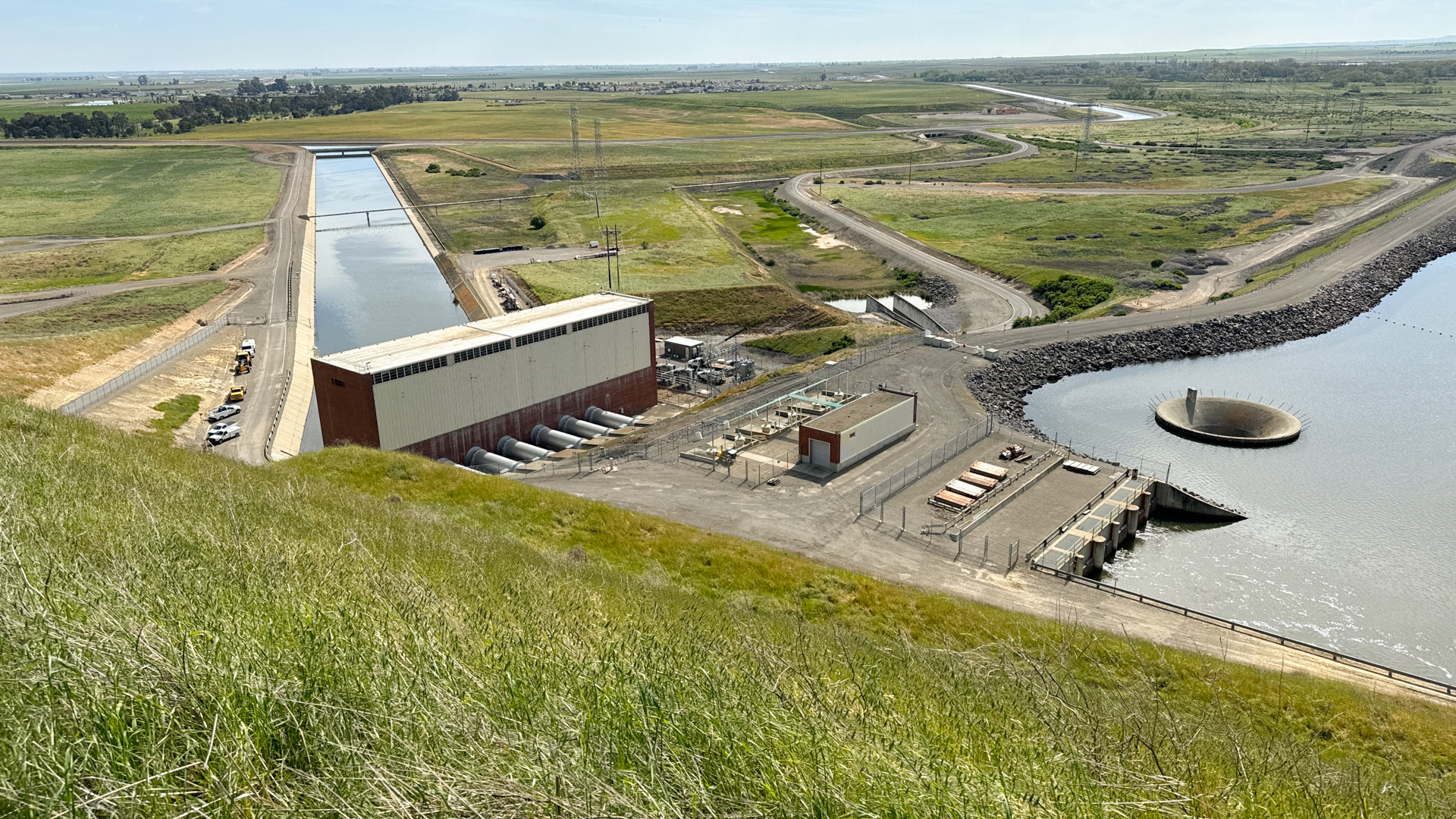
The O'Neill pumping plant in March 2024

Roughly 2.5 miles (4.0 km) downstream from the San Luis Dam, O'Neill Forebay collects irregular water releases from the San Luis Dam and the 424 MW pumped-storage hydroelectric William R. Gianelli Powerplant in its 56,400 acre⋅ft (69,600 dam^{3}) basin. A morning-glory type spillway lies at the left bank of the reservoir. The reservoir is fed by the California Aqueduct and the Delta–Mendota Canal. Water from the canal is lifted a vertical distance of 8 ft (2.4 m) into a channel running 2,200 ft (670 m) into the forebay.

== O'Neill Dam ==
O'Neill Dam, constructed from 1963 to 1967, is an 87.5 ft (26.7 m), earthfill and rockfill dam, stretching over 3 mi (4.8 km) across the valley of San Luis Creek. With a maximum reservoir depth of 57 ft (17 m), peak inflow to the forebay is 15,600 ft^{3} (0.44 dam^{3}) per second, from both the San Luis Dam and the Delta–Mendota Canal. The drainage area of the reservoir downstream of the San Luis Dam is only 18 acres (730 dam^{2}). The O'Neill Pumping-Generating Plant stores 28 megawatt hours of energy.

== Recreation ==
The California Office of Environmental Health Hazard Assessment (OEHHA) has developed an advisory for O'Neill Forebay because of mercury and PCBs found in fish caught here. The advisory provides safe eating advice for multiple fish species.

The largest striped bass caught in California was caught in the O’Neill Forebay. The fish, 52.5 in (1,330 mm) and weighing 70.6 lb (32.0 kg), was caught on August 5, 2008, by Frank Ualat of Gilroy, California.

== See also ==
- List of dams and reservoirs in California
- List of lakes in California
