= Sites Reservoir =

Proposed reservoir in Sacramento Valley, California

- Location within California
- Coordinates: 39°21′18″N 122°20′29″W
- Type: Offstream reservoir
- Primary outflows: Stone Corral Creek, Funks Creek
- Managing agency: California Department of Water Resources
- Built: 2024 start; 2030 completion (proposed)
- Max. length: 13 miles (21 km)
- Surface area: 14,000 acres (5,700 ha)
- Max. depth: 310 ft (94 m)
- Water volume: 1.8 million acre-feet (2.2 km^{3}) (max. as proposed)
- Surface elevation: 580 ft (180 m)

The Sites Reservoir is a proposed offstream reservoir project west of Colusa in the Sacramento Valley of northern California to be built and operated by the Sites Project Authority. The project would divert water from the Sacramento River upstream of the Sacramento–San Joaquin River Delta through existing canals to a new reservoir 14 miles (23 km) away. Annual yield would depend on precipitation and environmental restrictions.

Construction is planned to begin in 2027 with operations targeted to begin by 2034. The project is estimated to cost $3.9 billion and is funded by local, state, and federal public dollars. In 2018, the project was awarded $816 million in funding from California's Proposition 1 water bond, and secured a $449 million investment from the United States Department of Agriculture. The United States Bureau of Reclamation is also a significant project partner.

The reservoir would be operated as part of the California State Water Project (SWP). Estimated economic benefits are around $260 million per year, with an operating cost of $10–20 million. About 30 public water agencies, public irrigation districts, counties, and cities in California have tentatively committed funding based on a beneficiary pays principle.

== History ==
The Sites Reservoir was proposed in the 1950s. California had serious droughts in 1977–1978, 2006–2010, and 2011–2017, raising concern about water insecurity. The project is intended to improve reliability of supply during drought conditions.

Preliminary studies were conducted at a cost of $50 million during 1996–2014. In 2018, the state awarded $820 million from a bond (Proposition 1) to the reservoir project. The California Water Commission voted in favor of the feasibility of the project in December 2021. The project was certified by Governor Gavin Newsom in November 2023 under SB 149, a new law that provides certified projects streamlining benefits regarding legal challenges filed under the California Environmental Quality Act. In 2022, construction was scheduled to begin in late 2025. In July 2025, a master streambed alteration agreement from the California Department of Fish and Wildlife and a biological opinion from the U.S. Fish and Wildlife Service were approved, with construction due to begin before the end of 2027. With several permits still needed, the Sites Project Authority selected Barnard Construction Company to be the main contractor in January 2026.

== Governance, participation and funding ==
The Sites Project Authority (Authority) was formed on August 26, 2010, when seven regional entities, including several local water agencies and counties, executed the Joint Exercise of Powers Agreement. The primary purpose of the Authority, as stated in the agreement, is to pursue the development and construction of the Sites Reservoir Project, which has long been viewed as an ideal location for additional off-stream storage to provide direct and real benefits to instream flows, the Delta ecosystem, and water supply. The Authority is governed by a board of directors that collaborates with other groups in the region interested in the construction of Sites Reservoir Project.

Sites Reservoir is funded by local, state, and federal public dollars. Participation in Sites is broad and diverse, including the Bureau of Reclamation, State of California, urban areas of Southern California and the Bay Area, as well as public irrigation districts in the Sacramento Valley and San Joaquin Valley.

In 2018, the project was awarded $816 million in funding from California’s Proposition 1 water bond and secured a $449 million investment from the United States Department of Agriculture. In 2021, following the Authority's submission of the State Feasibility Report, the California Water Commission deemed the project feasible, which led to a $20 million inflation adjustment to the Proposition 1 award, making Sites Reservoir eligible for a total of $875 million in state funding.

The project has also received more than $224 million in federal funding through the Bureau of Reclamation including investments from the Water Infrastructure Improvements for the Nation Act (WIIN) Act) and the Infrastructure Investment and Jobs Act. The project was also selected to apply for a $2.2 billion Water Infrastructure Finance and Innovation Act (WIFIA) loan through the Environmental Protection Agency.

== Location and specifications ==
The project is located in a naturally occurring valley near Maxwell, California.

Once constructed, Sites Reservoir would stretch 13 miles (21 km) from north to south and 4 miles (6.4 km) from east to west. When full, the reservoir would be around 260 feet (79 m) deep from surface to floor at its lowest point. The reservoir can hold up to 1.5 million acre-feet of water, enough to serve 7.5 million people with water for an entire year. It will be the 8th largest reservoir in California.

Two primary dams, Sites Dam and Golden Gate Dam, would be constructed to hold water in the reservoir where hills drop too low, but they would not block major waterways or rivers. Sites Reservoir would also include nine small saddle dams and dikes to hold the water at the right level.

== Operations ==
Sites Reservoir would operate as a flexible water storage solution by diverting water from the Sacramento River during high flows, after all other water rights and regulatory requirements are met, and storing it until water is needed in drier years. Unlike other major reservoirs, Sites would not dam a major river or rely on snowmelt. It is a rain-fed reservoir that can capture and store runoff from extreme storms.

Sites Reservoir is uniquely located in relation to other major components of state and federal water projects like Shasta Lake, Lake Oroville, and Folsom Lake. The project would complement and extend these projects' functions by creating flexibility to adapt to changing river and Delta management conditions. For example, Sites can be operated in coordination with Shasta Lake to preserve and enhance cold water for endangered salmon in the Sacramento River or to increase fresh-water flow into the Delta during drier periods to assist with salinity management. Sites would not compete for the water resources stored in these state and federal facilities but would increase the total amount of managed water in storage.

=== Diversions ===
Sites Reservoir diversions would occur only during high river flows, so any reduction to Delta flows would be minor and would not impact any of the beneficial uses of the water in the Delta. Storing water in Sites Reservoir during high flow periods on the Sacramento River for use during times with the flows are low, including during drought periods, is part of the statewide strategy for adapting to changing climate conditions and to increase flexibility to the statewide water management system.

The diversion season can run from September 1 through June 14, after all other senior water rights and environmental requirements are fulfilled. However, based on the extensive modeling conducted for the Project, most water is to be diverted into storage from December through March.

=== Conveyance ===
Water for Sites Reservoir would come from two general sources: the Sacramento River and local creeks. Water from the Sacramento River is diverted at the existing Red Bluff Pumping Plant, owned by the United States Bureau of Reclamation and operated by the Tehama-Colusa Canal Authority, and at the Hamilton City Pump Station, owned and operated by the Glenn-Colusa Irrigation District. Both pumping facilities have state-of-the-art fish screens to protect fish during project operations.

Water diverted at the Red Bluff Pumping Plant, would enter the Tehama-Colusa Canal and be conveyed down to Funks Reservoir. From there, the Sites Project Authority would pump the water up into Sites Reservoir through a series of pipelines and tunnels.

After water is diverted at the Hamilton City Pump Station, it would enter Glenn-Colusa Irrigation District's Main Canal and be conveyed down to the new Terminal Regulating Reservoir. The Authority would then pump this water up into Sites Reservoir through a series of pipelines and a tunnel.

The maximum combined diversion capacity for Sites is about 4,200 cubic feet per second (8,300 acre-feet per day).

A significant portion of the more than 100 miles of conveyance (canals and pipelines) involved in the project is to be existing facilities. The only new conveyance envisioned is the inlet/outlet works for the reservoir and the four miles of 10-foot (3.0 m) diameter pipeline to convey water back to the Sacramento River between the Tehama-Colusa Canal and the Colusa Basin Drain.

== Environmental impacts ==
From 2017 to 2023, the Sites Project Authority and the Bureau of Reclamation completed a review process for potential environmental impacts and mitigation measures. The agencies completed three iterations of an Environmental Impact Report/Environmental Impact Statement, each more protective of the environment and communities surrounding the project without any new or greater impacts identified.

Through the multi-year process, the Sites Project Authority engaged the local community, tribes with traditional or cultural affiliation with the project area, and nongovernmental organizations, incorporating feedback and comments leading up to a Final Environmental Impact Report/Environmental Impact Statement that includes changes to the Project, mitigation measures to reduce impacts of the Project along with responses to the public comments received.

The project was certified by Governor Newsom under Senate Bill 149, making it eligible for streamlined judicial review under the California Environmental Quality Act (CEQA). Projects must meet certain criteria to be eligible for certification, as defined in the legislation, and be certified by the Governor.

The proposed reservoir is not located on a major river, but, as part of California water infrastructure, it would affect salmon fisheries by impounding water diverted from salmon-bearing watersheds, particularly the Trinity River via Lewiston Dam. Water pumped into the lake would be used to supplement flows into the delta or allow deeper, colder reservoirs to hold back water for critical salmon runs.

Diversions could take 60 percent of the Sacramento River's flow at times, potentially harming salmon and other fish. (The Sacramento River's flows include water allocated from the Trinity and other northern tributaries, despite harm to salmon runs in source watersheds.) The reservoir itself would affect habitat for 23 sensitive, threatened or endangered wildlife species. Evaporation from the 14,000-acre (5,700 ha) reservoir would remove 30,000 acre-feet (37,000,000 m^{3}) per year.

According to "Final Feasibility Report" submitted by the Bureau of Reclamation in December 2020: "A substantial portion of the project’s water would be specifically dedicated to environmental uses, helping to improve conditions for Delta smelt, preserving the cold-water pool in Lake Shasta to support salmon development, spawning and rearing, and providing a reliable water supply to improve the habitat for migratory birds and other native species".

To protect fisheries, the pumping stations along the Sacramento River are to have fish screens. There are potential modifications upstream at Shasta Dam that could increase the supply of cold water. The intakes at the Tehama-Colusa and Glenn-Colusa Canals are to be modified.

State regulators announced environmental restrictions in 2018 that would limit river withdrawals to protect fish, but the state has not included strong protections in infrastructure plans. The water supply could fall short of projections.

=== Environmental water ===
In alignment with the project's Proposition 1 funding, Sites Reservoir is planned to be the first and only reservoir in California that captures and stores a large portion of water specifically for the environment to support freshwater ecosystems. The environment is to be the single largest user of water stored in Sites Reservoir, managed and distributed by federal and state natural resource agencies.

=== Fisheries ===
The additional water supply provided by Sites Reservoir may provide opportunities for improved management of salmonid habitat, particularly in the Sacramento River above Red Bluff. By delivering water to CVP contractors from Sites Reservoir, Reclamation may maintain supply in Shasta Lake to support habitat for salmonid spawning, incubation, rearing, and migration. The possible additional water supply in Shasta Lake can then be allocated during real-time management scenarios for several uses (e.g., coldwater pool maintenance, spring pulse or fall pulse flow events, increased stability in fall flows) that may provide enhanced anadromous fish benefits.

=== Water quality ===
The Sites Project Authority is to implement best management practices to minimize any potential water quality impacts associated with facility operations and maintenance. These would include preventing spills and reducing runoff that may cause sediment or contaminants to flow into waterbodies, monthly water quality testing through the Yolo Bypass, and mitigation measures such as mercury sediment management.

=== Greenhouse gases ===
According to a 2023 report by Tell The Dam Truth and Friends of the River, funded by Patagonia, Inc., the Sites Project as designed is predicted to emit approximately 362,000 metric tons of CO2e/year averaged at the 75th percentile over an assumed 100-year life, including decommissioning (demolition/draining). The report states that emissions associated with decommissioning are an order of magnitude larger than emissions during the life of a large U.S. reservoir (meaning over 90% of emissions occur after year 100). The most significant component would be methane, as a result of decomposition of organic matter under, and flowing into, the reservoir.

The California State Water Resources Control Board announced an extension for filing protests, from August 1 to August 31, 2023. Opponents of the Sites project include the Natural Resources Defense Council (on the basis of (1) threats to salmon and other fish species and (2) little prospect of future drought relief), Golden State Salmon Association, which contends the project will increase water diversions from the Bay-Delta and impact salmon, other conservation groups, fishing groups, Tribes, and environmental justice advocates.

== See also ==
- Sites, California
- List of lakes in California
- Temperance Flat Dam
- San Luis Reservoir
