= Off-stream reservoir =

Type of artificial reservoir

An off-stream reservoir is a reservoir that is not located along a natural watercourse and is instead supplied by a pipeline, aqueduct or the redirection of adjacent watercourse. An off-stream reservoir may also serve as dry reservoirs, that is, they assist with flood mitigation and do not hold water until such time as a major flood event occurs. Most off-stream reservoirs are impounded by embankment dam walls made from rock-fill or earth-fill.

Off-stream reservoirs may assist in limiting the ecological impact of a reservoir.

== Examples of off-stream reservoirs ==
- San Luis Reservoir – the largest off-stream reservoir in the United States. Although it is located on a small stream, it gets the vast majority of its water from the California Aqueduct by pumping aqueduct water up-hill to the reservoir
- Sites Reservoir – a planned off-stream reservoir in California
- Cardinia Reservoir – and several other reservoirs that comprise the Melbourne Water supply system, in Australia
- Springbank Off-Stream Storage Project – completed in 2025 for flood mitigation, located in Alberta, Canada, the 70.2-megalitre (56.9 acre⋅ft) dry reservoir is fed by a 4.7-kilometre (2.9 mi) diversionary canal from the Glenmore Reservoir

== See also ==
- Types of dams
- Environmental impact of reservoirs
