= Stone Corral Creek (Colusa County, California) =

Stone Corral Creek is a watercourse in Colusa County, California. It has a drainage area of 38.2 square miles. The stream headwaters arise at 39°21′12″N 122°23′02″W and its confluence with the Colusa Trough flood control works two miles west of the current Sacramento River location is at 39°15′52″N 122°05′52″W at an elevation of 56 ft (17 m). The stream flows past the communities of Sites and Maxwell.
