= Sites, California =

Unincorporated community in California, United States

Sites
- Location within California
- Coordinates: 39°18′32.40″N 122°20′20.40″W
- Country: United States
- State: California
- County: Colusa
- Time zone: UTC-8 (PST)
  - Summer (DST): UTC-7 (PDT)
- ZIP code: 95979
- Area codes: 530, 837

Sites is an unincorporated community in Colusa County, California, United States. It lies at an elevation of 299 feet (91 m). Its ZIP code is 95979 and its area code is 530.

== History ==
Carl E. Grunsky named the area for John H. Sites, a landholder, in 1887. The same year, a Post Office was established. It was discontinued in 1968.

Sites was the western terminus of the narrow-gauge Colusa and Lake Railroad, completed in 1886 between Sites and the county seat of Colusa. A large sandstone quarry operated near Sites in the late nineteenth and early twentieth centuries, generating much traffic for the railroad; sandstone from the Sites Quarry was used in notable buildings including San Francisco's Ferry Building and Spreckels Building.

Sites and the valley surrounding it have been considered a prime candidate for the location of the Sites Reservoir that would store water for the state system.

== Politics ==
In the state legislature, Sites is in the 4th senatorial district, represented by Republican Marie Alvarado-Gil, and the 3rd Assembly district, represented by Vacant. Federally, Sites is in California's 3rd congressional district, represented by Independent Kevin Kiley.
