= C.W. Bill Jones Pumping Plant =

Building near Tracy, California, US

Coordinates: 37.796603°N 121.585494°W

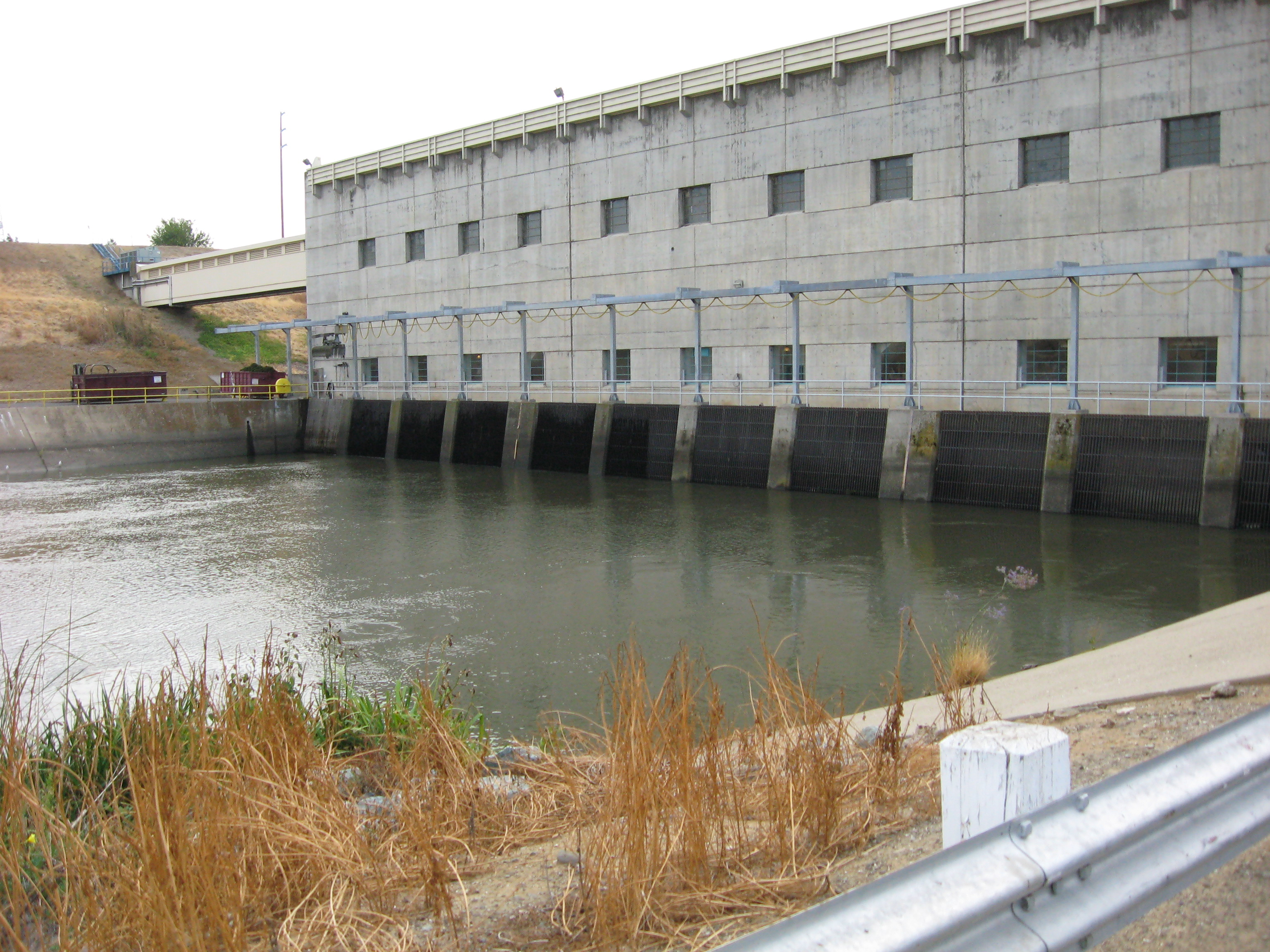

The C.W. Bill Jones Pumping Plant (formerly the Tracy Pumping Plant) located 9 miles (14 km) northwest of Tracy, California, was constructed between 1947 and 1951, and is a key component of the Central Valley Project. The Delta Cross Channel intercepts Sacramento River water as it travels westwards towards Suisun Bay and diverts it south through a series of man-made channels, the Mokelumne River, and other natural sloughs, marshes and distributaries. From there, the water travels to the C.W. Bill Jones Pumping Plant, which raises water into the Delta-Mendota Canal, which in turn travels 117 miles (188 km) southwards to Mendota Pool on the San Joaquin River, supplying water to other CVP reservoirs about midway. The Tracy Fish Collection Facility exists at the entrance of the pump plant in order to catch fish that would otherwise end up in the Delta-Mendota Canal.

The Jones Pumping Plant provides water service to 32 water districts within the western San Joaquin Valley, San Benito and Santa Clara counties. Of the approximate 3,000,000 acre-feet (3.7×10^{9} m^{3}) of water distributed, 2,500,000 acre-feet (3.1×10^{9} m^{3}) is delivered to farms, 200,000 acre-feet (250,000,000 m^{3}) to urban areas, including Tracy and cities with in the Santa Clara Valley Water District, and 300,000 acre-feet (370,000,000 m^{3}) for wildlife refuges.

== Specifications ==
- pumps: six 22,500 HP electric motors
- normal lift: 197 feet (60 m)
- maximum pumping rate: 5200 cubic feet per second (2,000,000 gallons per minute, 8,500 acre-feet (10,500,000 m^{3}) per day)
