= San Justo Dam =

Dam and reservoir in San Benito County, California, U.S.

Coordinates: 36°49′38″N 121°26′39″W

San Justo Dam is a dam and reservoir in San Benito County, California, about three miles (5 km) southwest of Hollister. The dam provides offstream water storage for the federal Central Valley Project via the Pacheco Conduit and Hollister Conduit fed by the San Luis Reservoir.

Completed in January 1986, the dam is an earthfill structure 151 feet (46 m) high. Along with a companion dike structure 79 feet (24 m) high, it forms a reservoir with a capacity of about 9,785 acre-feet (12 million cubic meters).

San Justo Reservoir was closed in 2008 following a zebra mussel infection and remains closed until further notice.

== See also ==
- List of lakes in California
