= Delta–Mendota Canal =

Aqueduct in Central California

Coordinates: 37.092721°N 121.040755°W

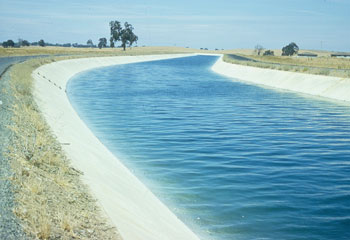
The Delta-Mendota Canal

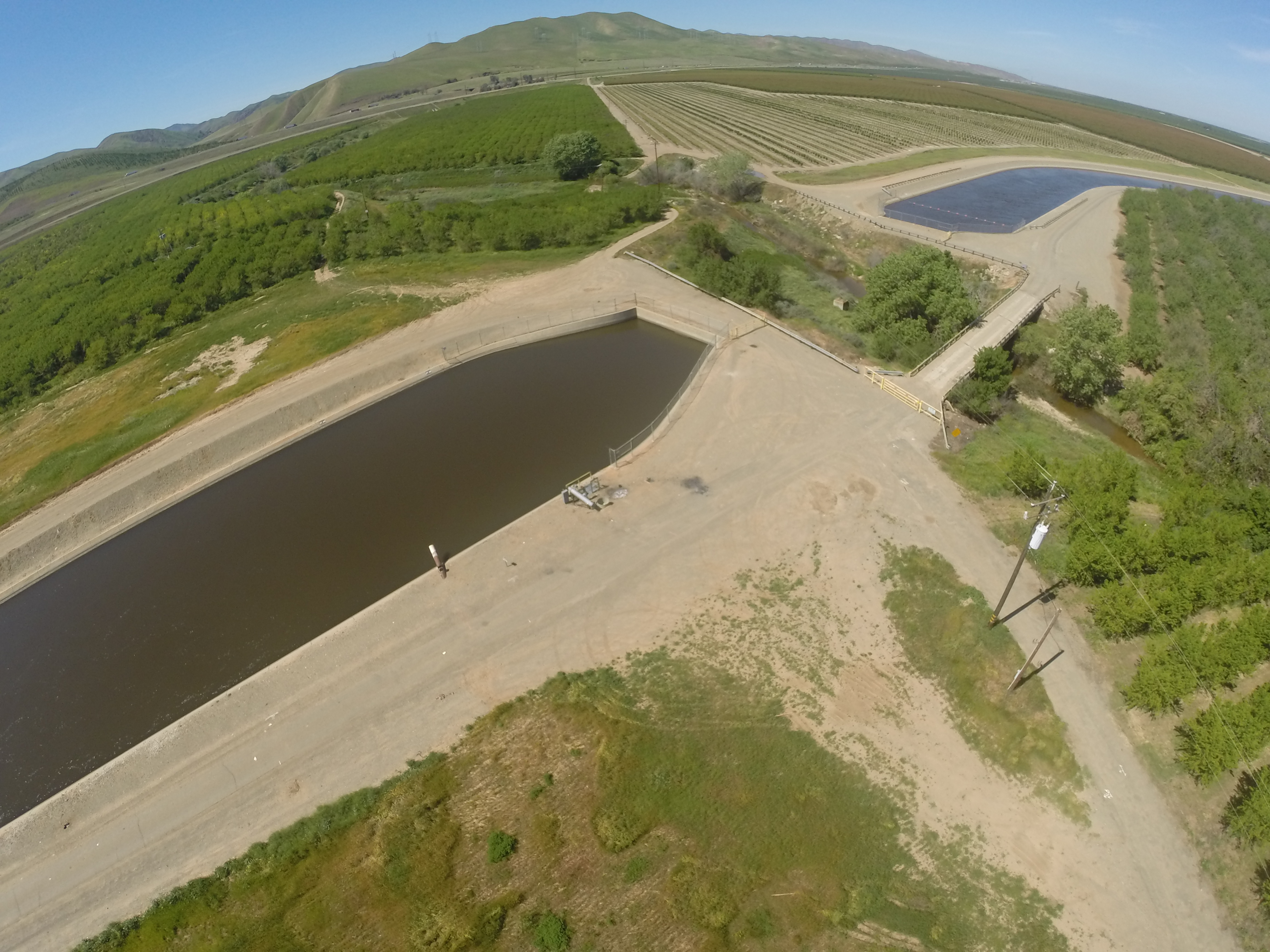
Canal siphon under a smaller stream, north of Patterson, California

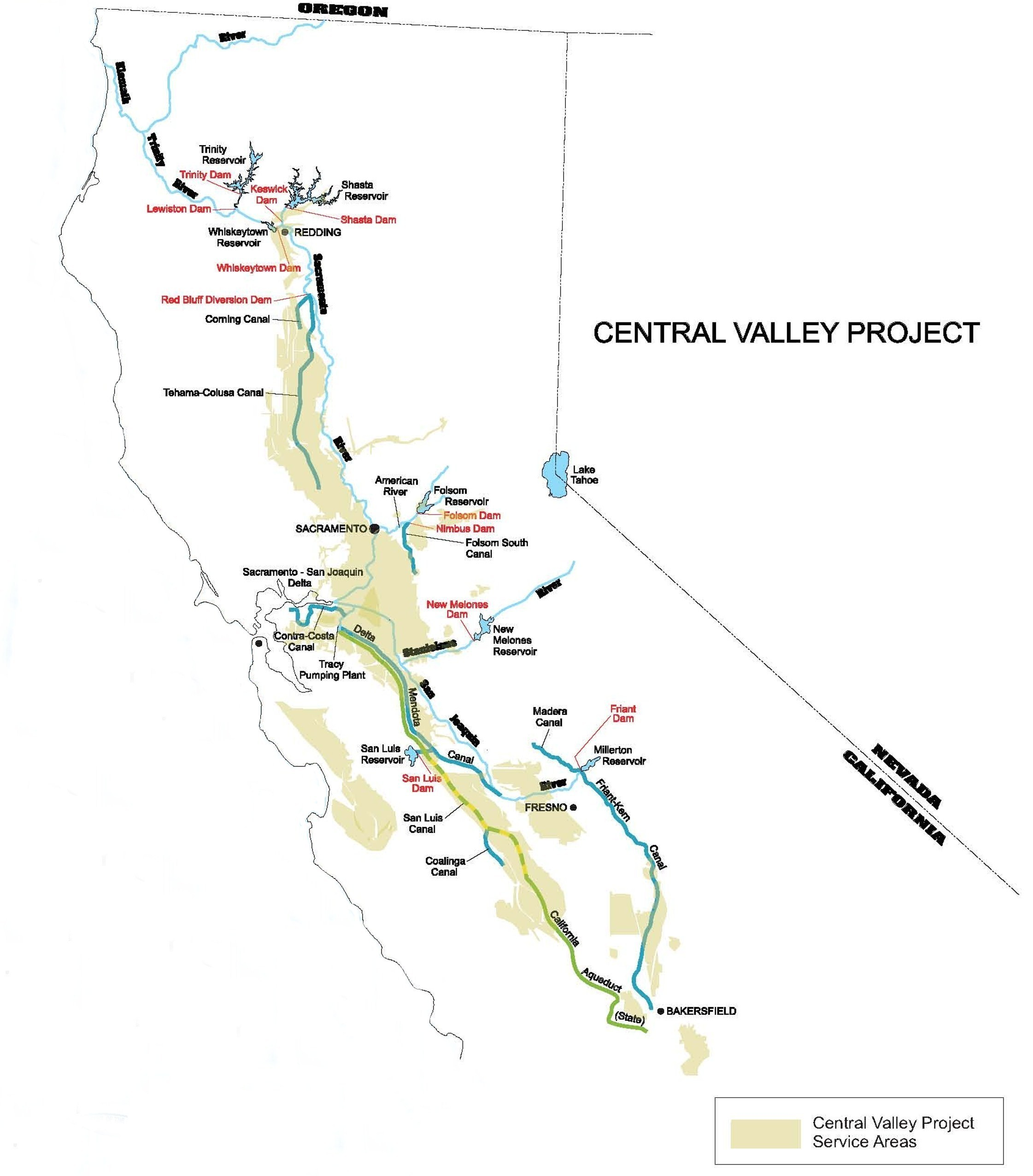
Map of Central Valley Project. Delta Mendota Canal, in blue, runs northwest to southeast, in the central part of the map.

The Delta–Mendota Canal is a 117-mile-long (188 km) aqueduct in central California, United States. The canal was designed and completed in 1951 by the U.S. Bureau of Reclamation as part of the Central Valley Project. It carries freshwater to replace San Joaquin River water which is diverted into the Madera Canal and Friant-Kern Canal at Friant Dam.

The canal begins at the C.W. Bill Jones Pumping Plant (also known as the Tracy Pumping Plant). Water is lifted 197 ft (60 m) from the Sacramento-San Joaquin Delta at the Clifton Court Forebay. The canal runs southward along the western edge of the San Joaquin Valley, parallel to the California Aqueduct, and diverges to the east after passing the San Luis Reservoir, receiving more water and eventually emptying into the San Joaquin River near the city of Mendota. The canal travels through six California counties: Alameda, San Joaquin, Stanislaus, Merced, and Fresno counties.

== History ==
After years of drought, the state of California highlighted the importance of a large-scale water project, thus creating the California State Water Plan, but eventually being taken over by the U.S. Bureau of Reclamation in 1931 due to the Great Depression. In 1937 the Central Valley Project was approved by Congress to deliver freshwater throughout the San Joaquin Valley. The Friant-Kern Canal east of Fresno was built to distribute water through the eastern parts of the Central Valley, however, altered the natural flows of the San Joaquin River between the Friant Dam and confluence of the Merced River. The Delta–Mendota Canal was approved for the exchange of water rights in the downstream portion of the San Joaquin River. With the use of the Tracy Pumping Plant, water from the Sacramento River would be diverted into the Delta–Mendota Canal. The United States Bureau of Reclamation and the San Luis Delta Mendota Water Authority are responsible for maintaining the water quality that is discharged at the south end of the canal. The Delta–Mendota Canal is also a key feature to the Delta Division Project which is managed by the Bureau of Reclamation, to minimize salt intrusion from the San Francisco Bay.

Due to the length of the canal, it required several contracts to complete the construction. The first contracts given by the Bureau of Reclamation were awarded on June 14, 1946, to Hubert H. Everist for station 686+00-1365+00, and workers went on strike against the subcontractor Fred J. Maurer and Son. The next series of contracts were awarded on October 24, 1946 to the Morrison Knudsen Company, Inc., and the M.H. Hasler Construction Company, who worked on the stations 185+00-231+00 and 243+00-774+00. Other contractors were the Columbia Pumping Plant, Mowry Pumping Plant, United Concrete Pipe Corporation, Western Contracting Corporation, A. Teichert & Sons, Inc. General work shifts consisted of 3 daily shifts, twenty-one hours a day, 6 days a week.

The pumping plants in the Delta Division have serious impacts on the flow of the Delta and San Joaquin River Basin. During relatively dry years and a high exportation rate, flow of the San Joaquin River has been reversed. This flow reversal confuses migratory fish, and brings saline water.

== Water movement ==
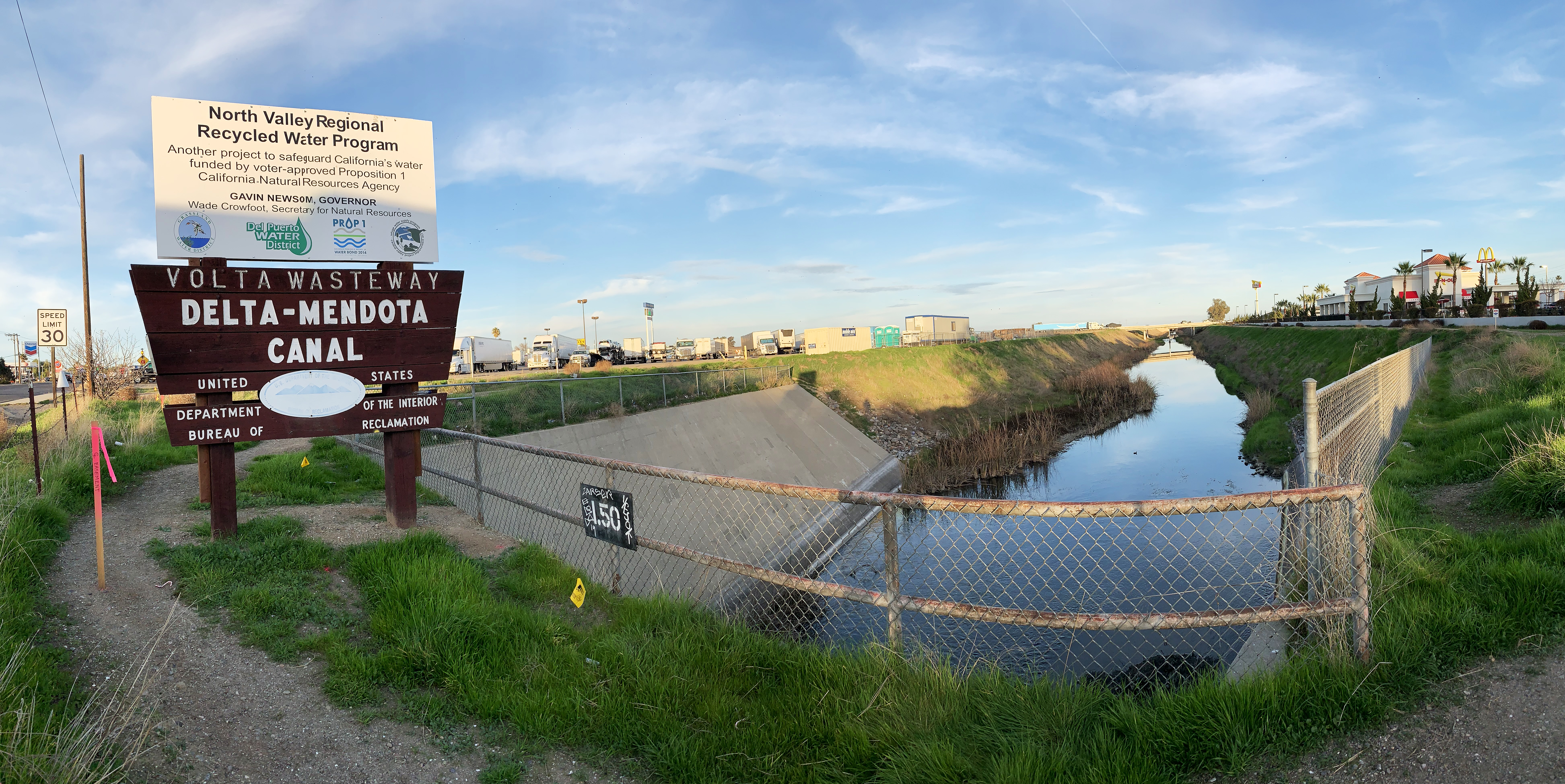
Delta-Mendota Canal, Volta Wasteway Crossing

An important feature of the Central Valley Project, with regards to directing water southward through the Delta–Mendota Canal is the C.W. Bill Jones Pumping Plant, formerly known as the Tracy Pumping Plant (TPP). The pumping station is 60 miles (96 km) to the southeast from the City of San Francisco, in the rural community of Byron, California, near the city of Tracy.

Water is extracted from the southern portion of the San Joaquin Delta, and pumped to contractors in the San Joaquin Valley, San Benito and Santa Clara counties to meet urban and agricultural demands. With the use of two 15 foot diameter pipes, six 22,500-horsepower motors, roughly 8,500 Acre-feet (AF) of water from the Delta can be transported southward daily, after being lifted nearly 200 feet.

The plant is named to honor a pioneer in water management for the San Joaquin Valley, and was president of the San Luis and Delta-Mendota Water Association for two decades.

=== Use ===
The water is pumped from the canal into O'Neill Forebay, and then is pumped into San Luis Reservoir by the Gianelli Pumping-Generating Plant. Occasionally, water from O'Neill Forebay is released into the canal. The Delta–Mendota Canal ends at Mendota Pool, on the San Joaquin River near the city of Mendota, 30 mi (48 km) west of Fresno. The Delta–Mendota Canal capacity is 4,600 cu ft/s (130 m^{3}/s) and gradually decreases to 3,211 cu ft/s (90.9 m^{3}/s) at its terminus. Average annual throughput is 1,993,000 acre-feet (2.458 km^{3}).

=== The Intertie Project ===
In order to improve water delivery in the State of California, an intertie, which is defined as a connection between 2 or more current utilities, was constructed between the Delta–Mendota Canal and the California Aqueduct. The Intertie was constructed in the rural agricultural region of the southwestern portion of the San Joaquin Valley in Alameda County, near the city of Tracy, California. A series of two 108 inch diameter pipes of 500 feet in length connect the state managed California Aqueduct and the federally managed Delta–Mendota Canal. The pipes have a capacity to pump 467 cubit feet of water per second from the California Aqueduct to the Delta–Mendota Canal. This amount of water restores 35,000 acre feet of water annually to the Central Valley Project. The pumps use vertical power, which are more efficient than horizontal pumps, as it removes the need for a gearbox, as well as requires less maintenance and space. The four pumping units are from Cascade Pump Company from Santa Fe Springs, California, Pump Model 48MF with a 48-inch diameter discharge, with the capability to pump 55,125 gallons per minute. Due to the structural deficiencies of the C.W. Bill Jones Pumping Plant, The Intertie improves the overall water delivery system, and allows maintenance and emergencies to be addressed more easily. Completion of the project was April 2012. The cost of construction was an estimated $29 million, and will be repaid by the contractors who purchase water.

=== Protecting fish species ===
Another key feature is the Tracy Fish Collection Facility. In order to protect threatened and endangered species, a series of sloughs, channels, and tanks, help capture the fish and safely reintroduce them into the Delta waterways. Constructed in the 1950s, its objective is to protect aquatic fauna from being injured or killed by the pumps that facilitate water to the south of the state. The facility is roughly 1 km east from the Pumping Plant, and became operational 1957. Most common fish species safely moved through the series of louvers are American shad, Splittail, White Catfish, Delta smelt, Chinook salmon, and Striped bass. Historical trends show a decrease in efficient fish diversion, and it is believed due to poor water quality, increased water pollution, changes in water operations, and change of water demands for the various water users. Due to those reasons, physical improvements and changes in procedure are being made.

== Land subsidence ==
Land subsidence is prevalent throughout the San Joaquin Valley, but was unrecognized prior to the construction of the canal. After construction, discrepancies in elevation were believed to be caused by earthquake. Post construction years, the southern 30–40 miles of the canal exceeded subsidence of 6 feet. Nearly two-thirds of the canal has been impacted by subsidence, over 20 miles of the concrete lined canal, and all the earth lined portion. By 1966, 35 miles demonstrated a drop of 1 feet, 3 feet elevation drop in 15 mile stretch, 5 foot decrease in a 5-mile portion, and 2 feet of the canal demonstrated a drop of 6 feet. Land subsidence in the region is due to constant over-drafting of underground water. Another key factor is due to the San Joaquin Valley's geomorphological structure, having young continental, unconsolidated sandy-silty-clayish soils, resting on old unconsolidated marine beds.

Impacts of the land subsidence lead to a decrease between bridges and water level surface. In regions of greater subsidence, portions of bridges, pipes, and cattle guards would be inundated. Unfortunately, land subsidence has led to a decrease in total water conveyance capacity available within the canal. No major negative impacts to the integrity of the structure of the canal have been noted, though minor issues requiring additional maintenance have been report.

== Recirculation feasibility study ==
The U.S. Department of the Interior, Bureau of Reclamation evaluated the ability to improve water quality, energy consumption and production, productive fisheries, and flow to the San Joaquin River with the use of recirculation strategies using the Central Valley Project facilities. The Recirculation Feasibility Study Project was authorized by CALFED (California Federal Bay-Delta Program) Bay-Delta Authorization Act of 2004 (118 Stat. §§ 1681–1702.; Public Law 108-361). History has shown that low precipitation patterns can lead to pumping stations reversing the flow in the San Joaquin River, that negatively impacts fish migration patterns.

== Recreational activities ==
Fishing access is provided in Canal Site 2A in Stanislaus County and Canal Site 5 in Fresno county, both providing parking and restrooms. Many use the gravel road adjacent to the canal for biking and walking. No water-contact activities aside from fishing are allowed.

- U.S. Geological Survey Geographic Names Information System: Delta-Mendota Canal
- United States Bureau of Reclamation
- USGS annual flow data
