= San Luis Reservoir =

Lake in Merced County, California, United States of America

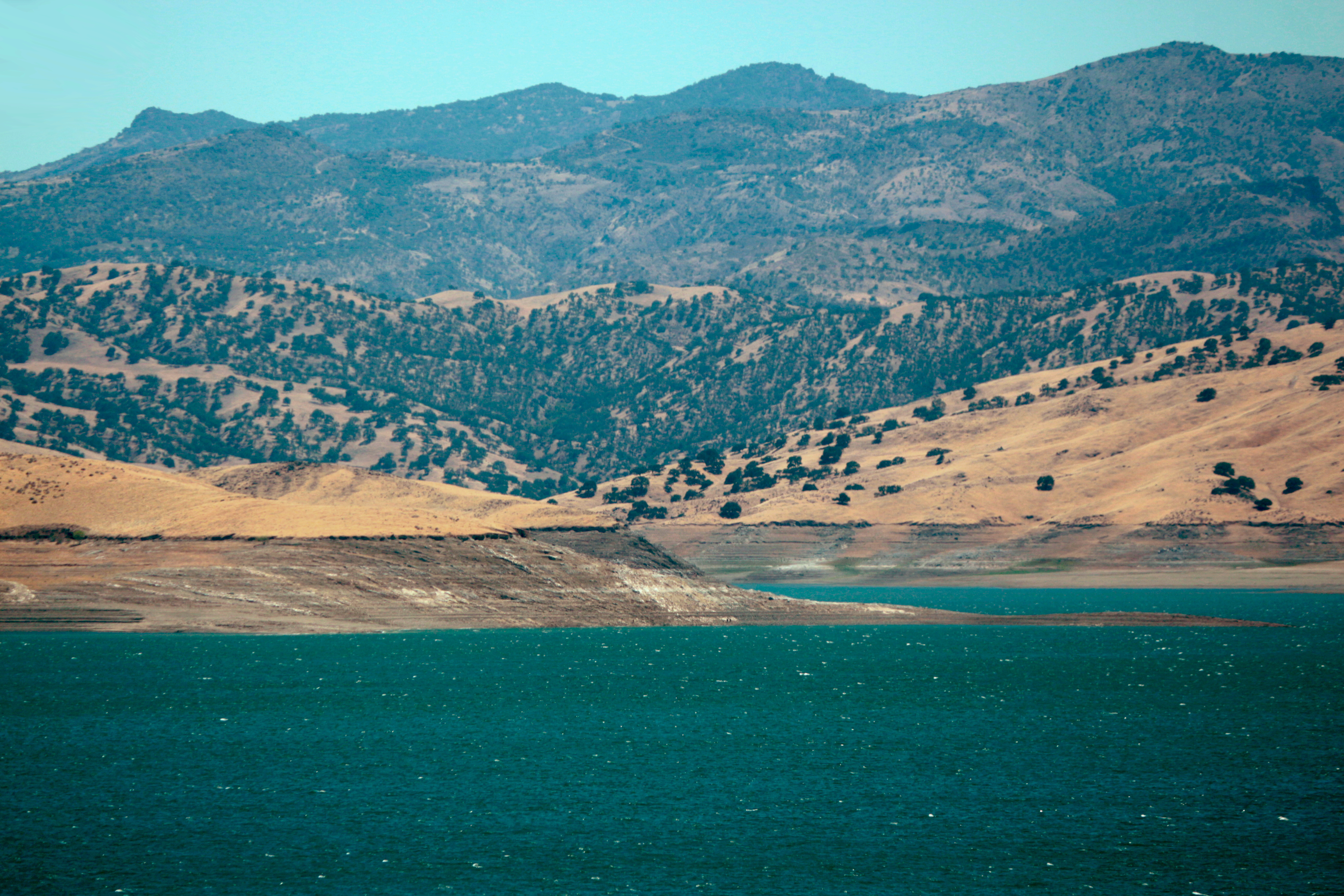
- The reservoir and nearby mountains in July 2021

- Location within California Location within the United States
- Location: Merced County, California
- Coordinates: 37.0679°N 121.081°W
- Type: Reservoir
- Primary inflows: San Luis Creek, Cottonwood Creek
- Primary outflows: California Aqueduct
- Catchment area: 84.6 sq mi (219 km^{2})
- Basin countries: United States
- Managing agency: U.S. Bureau of Reclamation and California Department of Water Resources
- Surface area: 12,700 acres (5,100 ha)
- Water volume: 2,041,000 acre-feet (2,518,000 dam^{3})
- Surface elevation: 544 ft (166 m)
- References: U.S. Geological Survey Geographic Names Information System: San Luis Reservoir

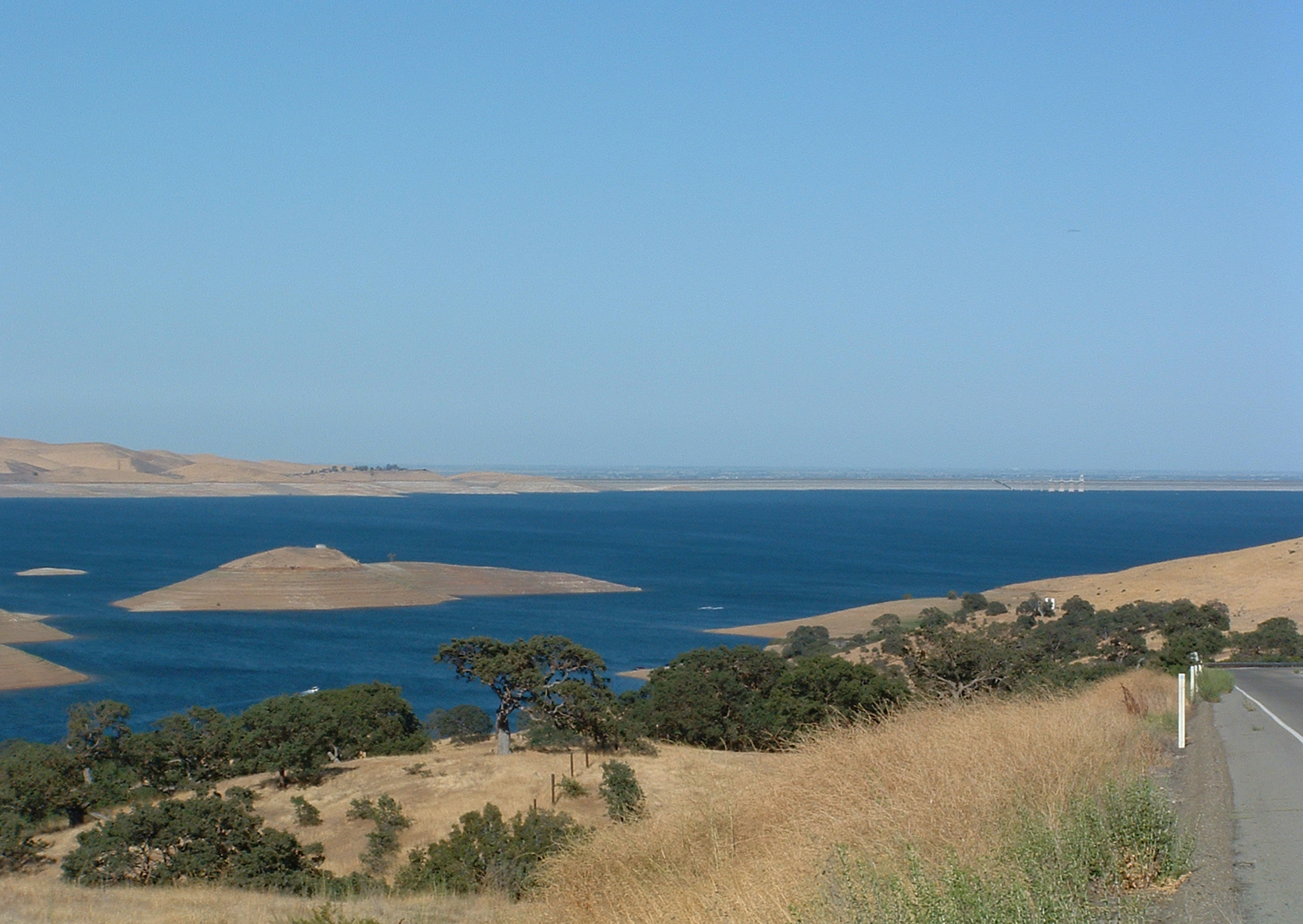
The reservoir in 2002

Panoramic view of the reservoir

The San Luis Reservoir is an artificial lake on San Luis Creek in the eastern slopes of the Diablo Range of Merced County, California, approximately 12 mi (19 km) west of Los Banos on State Route 152, which crosses Pacheco Pass and runs along its north shore. It is the fifth largest reservoir in California. The reservoir stores water taken from the San Joaquin-Sacramento River Delta. Water is pumped uphill into the reservoir from the O'Neill Forebay which is fed by the California Aqueduct and is released back into the forebay to continue downstream along the aqueduct as needed for farm irrigation and other uses. Depending on water levels, the reservoir is approximately nine miles (14 km) long from north to south at its longest point, and five miles (8 km) wide. At the eastern end of the reservoir is the San Luis Dam, the fourth largest embankment dam in the United States, which allows for a total capacity of 2,041,000 acre-feet (2,518,000 dam^{3}). Pacheco State Park lies along its western shores.

Completed in 1967 on land formerly part of Rancho San Luis Gonzaga, the 12,700 acres (5,100 ha) reservoir is a joint use facility, being a part of both the California State Water Project and federal Central Valley Project, which together form a network of reservoirs, dams, pumping stations, and 550 miles (885 km) of canals and major conduits to move water across California. The San Luis Reservoir is located in Merced County, and has a visitor center located at the Romero Outlook where visitors can learn more about the dam and reservoir. The surface of the reservoir lies at an elevation of approximately 544 ft (166 m), with the O'Neill Forebay below the dam at 225 ft (69 m) above sea level. This elevation difference allows for a hydroelectric plant to be constructed - the Gianelli Hydroelectric Plant. Power from this plant is sent to a Path 15 substation, Los Banos via a short power line. Those 500 kV wires, carrying both the power generated here and elsewhere, leave the area and cross the O'Neill Forebay on several man-made islands.

San Luis Reservoir also supplies water to 63,500 acres (25,700 ha) of land in the Santa Clara Valley west of the Coast Ranges. San Justo Dam stores water diverted from San Luis Reservoir through the Pacheco Tunnel and Hollister Conduit, which travel through the Diablo Range. The Santa Clara Tunnel and Santa Clara Conduit convey water to the Coyote Pumping Station in the Santa Clara Valley.

== San Luis Reservoir State Recreation Area ==
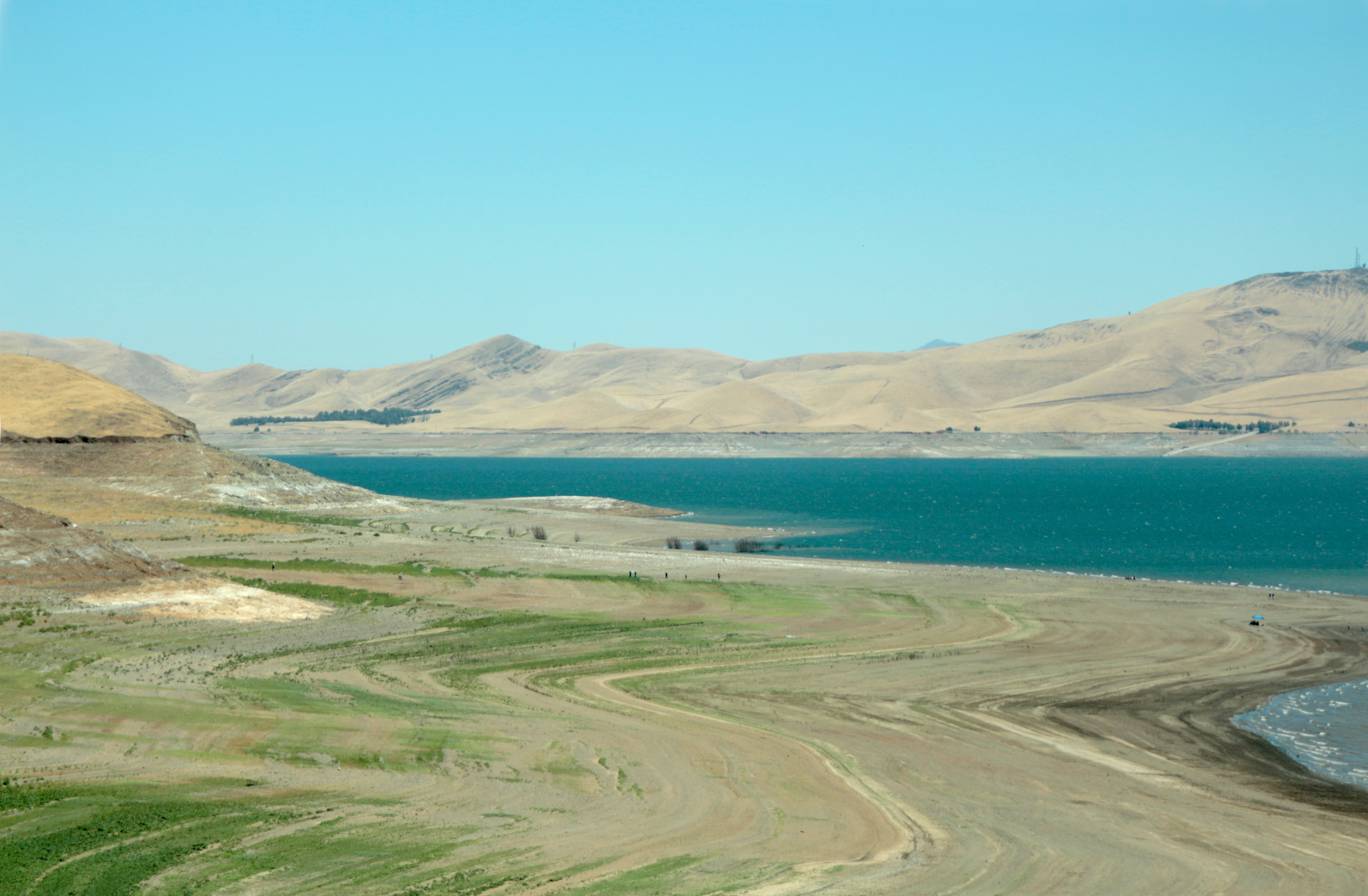
People at the reservoir's beaches in July 2021

San Luis Reservoir is part of the larger San Luis Reservoir State Recreation Area (California State Parks) and therefore offers many recreational opportunities for fishermen, boaters, and campers. The park is patrolled by California State Park Peace Officers by vehicle, vessel, and off-highway vehicle. In addition to camping and boating, day use picnic areas are available at San Luis Creek, and an off-highway vehicle (OHV) area is available east of the main area at the intersection of Gonzaga Road and Jaspar-Sears Road.

Camping is available at four campgrounds.

- The Basalt Campground on the south-eastern edge of the lake with 79 developed family campsites. Water faucets are available nearby, and some sites can handle RV's to a length of 40 feet (12 m).
- San Luis Creek Campground on O'Neill Forebay with 53 sites with water and electric hook-ups.
- Medeiros Campground has primitive campsites along the southern shoreline of O'Neill Forebay. This campground has drinking water at three locations and chemical toilets.
- Los Banos Creek Campground has primitive campsites and limited turn-around space. It is not suitable for trailers or motor homes. Drinking water and chemical toilets are available.

Improved boat launch ramps are offered at Dinosaur Point and the Basalt area. Due to the reservoir's water being imported from the Sacramento River Delta, San Luis shares many of its fish species with that area, including largemouth bass, striped bass, crappie, bluegill, shad, yellow perch, and occasional sturgeon and salmon. The California Office of Environmental Health Hazard Assessment (OEHHA) has developed a safe eating advisory for fish caught in the San Luis Reservoir based on levels of mercury or PCBs found in local species. The lake is noted for its high winds and has wind warning lights at Romero Outlook, Basalt Campground, and Quien Sabe Point.

== Climate ==
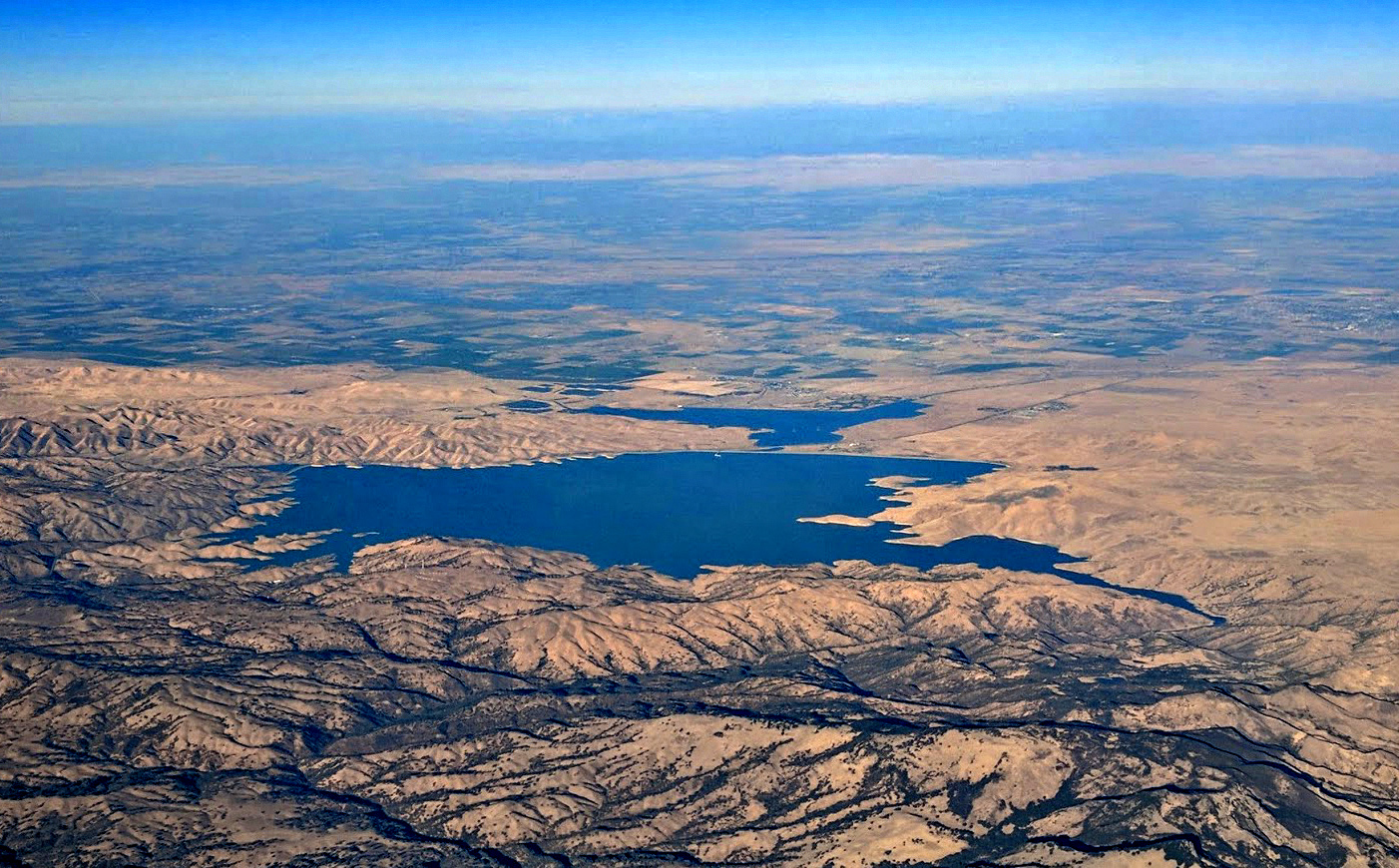
The San Luis Reservoir and O'Neill Forebay, aerial view from near Hollister, California, with late afternoon shadows outlining the hills of the oak woodlands around it.

The National Weather Service has maintained a cooperative weather station at San Luis Dam since 1963. Based on those records, average January temperatures are a maximum of 54.3 °F (12.4 °C) and a minimum of 37.9 °F (3.3 °C) and average July temperatures are a maximum of 92 °F (33 °C) and a minimum of 64.0 °F. There are an average of 69.3 days with highs of 90 °F (32 °C) or higher and an average of 14.1 days with lows of 32 °F (0 °C) or lower. The record high temperature was 110 °F (43 °C) on July 24, 2006, and the record low temperature was 14 °F (−10 °C) on December 22, 1990.

Average annual precipitation is 10.36 in (263 mm). There are an average of 57 days annually with measurable precipitation. The wettest year was 1998 with 25.06 in (637 mm) and the driest year was 1989 with 4.88 in (124 mm). The most precipitation in one month was 9.03 in (229 mm) in February 1998. The most precipitation in 24 hours was 3.70 in (94 mm) on May 6, 1998. Snow rarely falls at the reservoir, but 1.2 in (30 mm) of snow fell on January 9, 2001.

== See also ==
- List of dams and reservoirs in California
- List of lakes in California
- List of largest reservoirs in the United States
- List of largest reservoirs of California

== Gallery ==
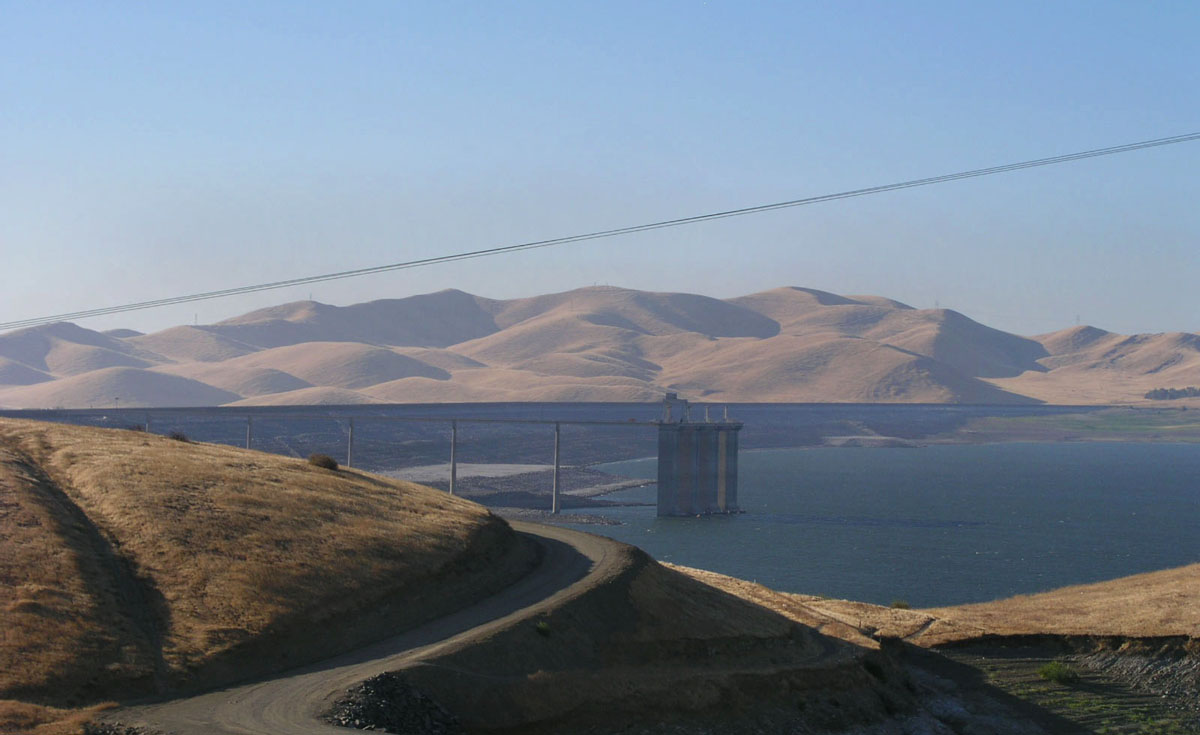
San Luis Dam

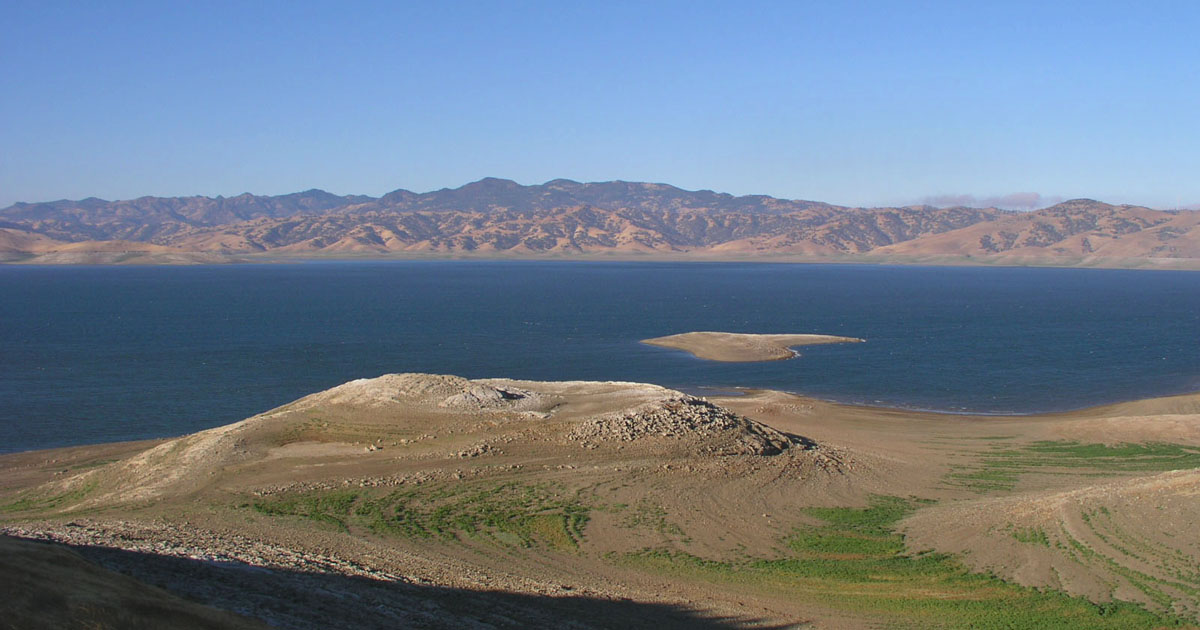
San Luis Reservoir from Romero Outlook

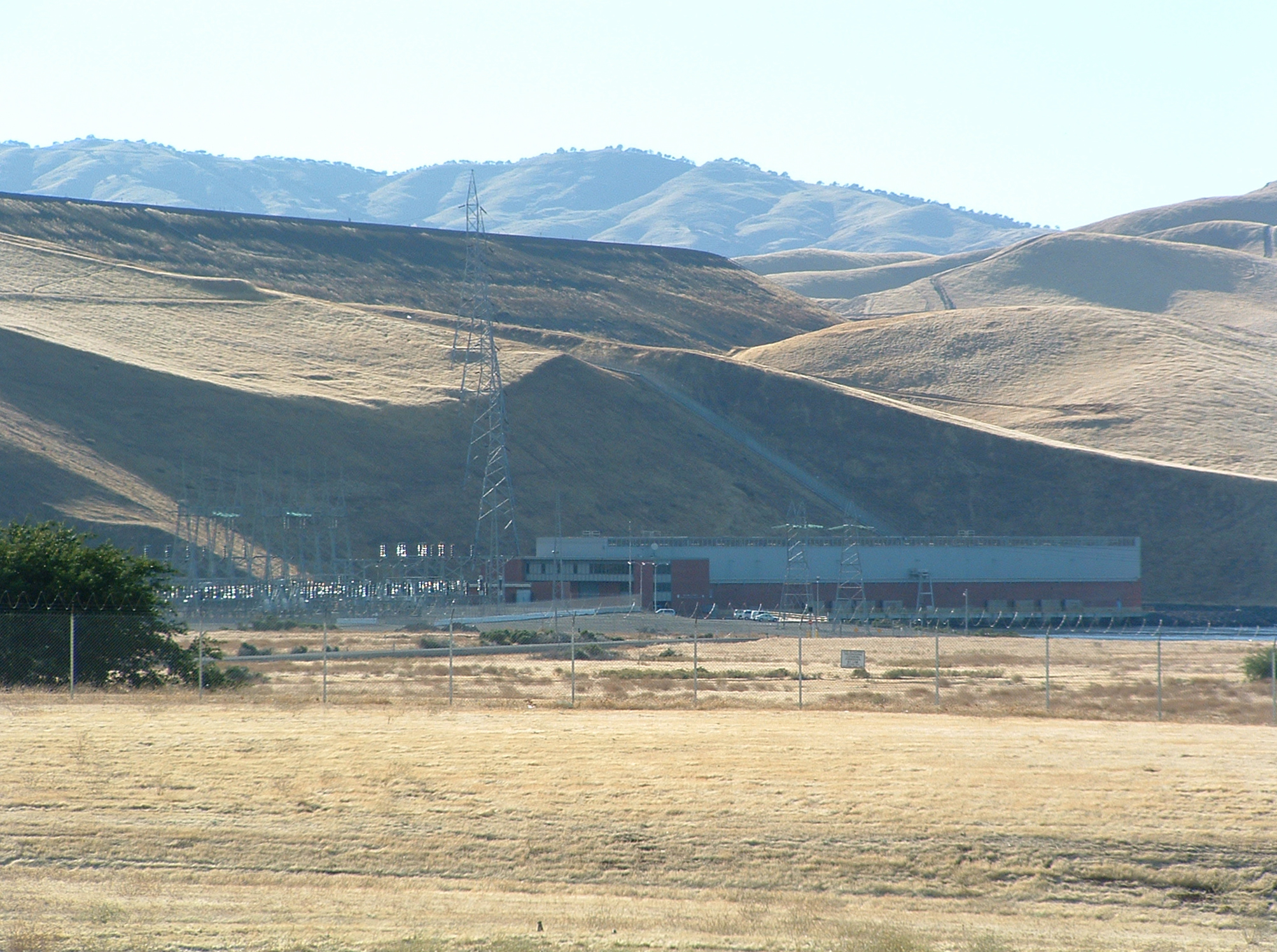
San Luis Dam and Gianelli Powerhouse

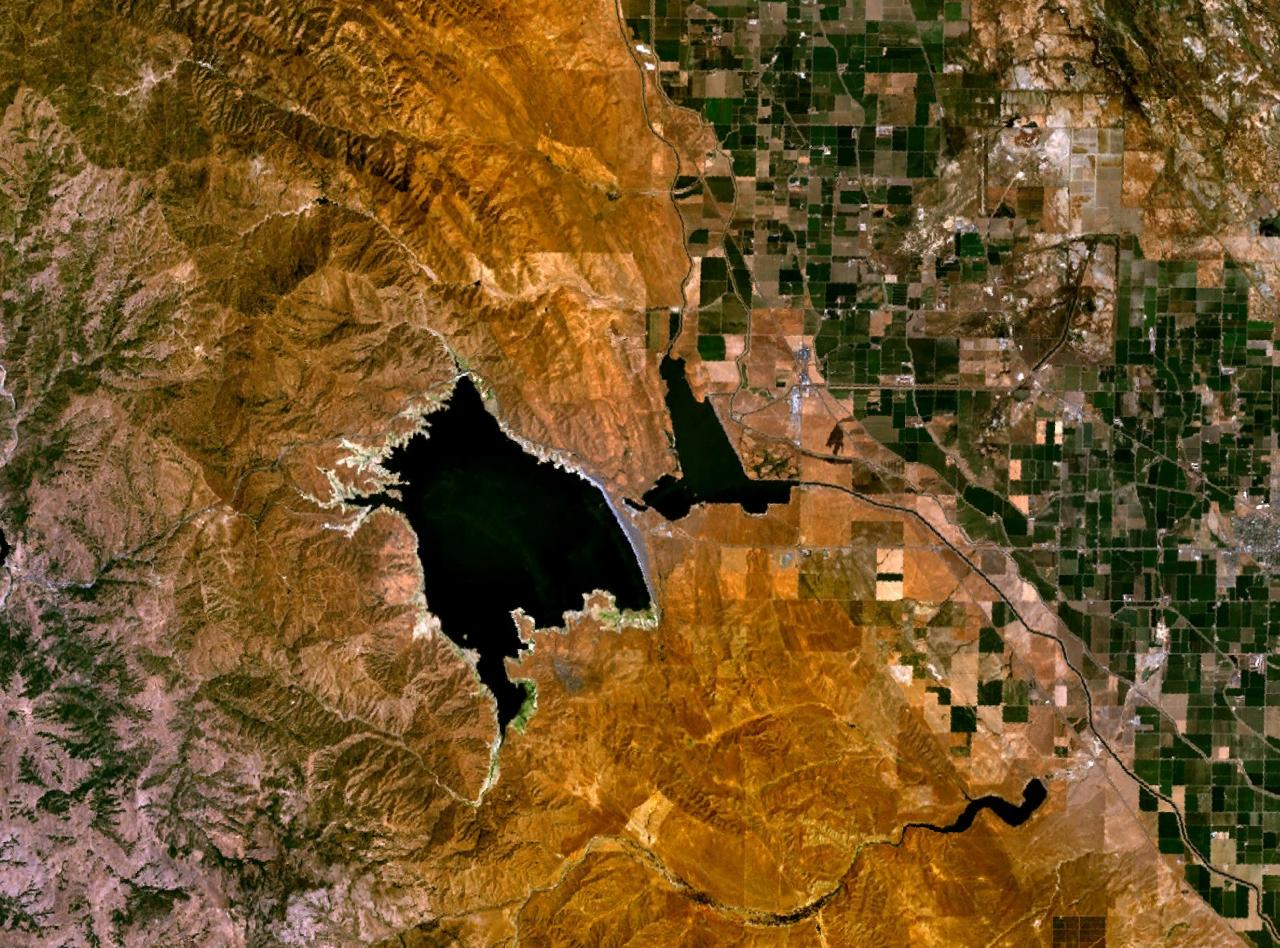
Satellite photo of San Luis Dam and the O'Neill Forebay
