= Central Valley land subsidence =

Land sinking when groundwater is withdrawn too quickly

The Central Valley in California subsides when groundwater is pumped faster than underground aquifers can be recharged. The Central Valley has been sinking (subsiding) at differing rates since the 1920s and is estimated to have sunk up to 28 feet (8.5 m). During drought years, the valley is prone to accelerated subsidence due to groundwater extraction. California periodically experiences droughts of varying lengths and severity.

The Central Valley is an agriculturally productive region dependent on large volumes of irrigation water. This region is considered arid to semiarid and is reliant on infrastructure to deliver water. The Central Valley is prone to excessive flooding due to snowmelt from the surrounding Sierra Nevada mountain range in the spring. A controlled system of dams and canals have been built by state and federal agencies to ensure a steady flow of water into the valley primarily to support agriculture. The California State Water Project and the Central Valley Project are the two main projects diverting surface water into the valley. This system helps prevent spring flooding and summer and fall water shortages.

Farmers use a combination of surface water and groundwater for irrigation. During drought years there is less surface water being provided to farmers and they rely on pumping more groundwater. In California, there is a hierarchy of water entitlement in which those with water rights have precedence to receive and use surface water. Farmers without water rights may not always receive surface water during drought years. Farmers not receiving surface water may choose to rely on groundwater for irrigation. Drought years accelerate land subsidence in the Central Valley due to a collective effort of increased groundwater pumping without replenishing underground aquifers.

== Groundwater pumping ==
Groundwater in the Central Valley is primarily used for irrigation needs in the agriculture industry and is retrieved using wells. During drought years, groundwater pumping is increased due a shortage of surface water available to farmers. Land subsides most rapidly during drought years due to the increased pumping and lack of sufficient groundwater recharge. Aquifers are not sufficiently recharged due to decreased rainfall and over-utilization of surface water.

As groundwater is pumped, the aquifers are depleted and the water table drops. As the water table falls, competition may occur between farmers to drill deeper underground in order to avoid their well going dry. Agricultural wells may extend as far as 2,000 feet below ground.

Drought years increase the utilization of groundwater which creates a large demand for well drilling businesses. During peak demand, the cost of drilling inflates and clients may be put on waiting lists for lengths of time which exceed growing seasons. There are various irrigation techniques which can reduce water waste and prevent excessive groundwater use. For example, almond orchards require large volumes of water, but due to an increased use of drip tape farmers have dramatically reduced water use.

Governor Jerry Brown of California also imposed restrictions on unnecessary water usage during the California drought that began in 2012. Measures included drought-tolerant landscaping, rebate programs for purchasing water efficient appliances, and setting a statewide goal of 25% reduction in water usage. Brown also signed a bill allowing for $500 fines to residents who used water unnecessarily during declared drought emergencies. Unnecessary use includes watering sidewalks and exceeding use limits set by urban water suppliers.

== Monitoring ==
Land subsidence in the Central Valley is monitored by various government agencies including NASA, the California Department of Water Resources, the USGS, and various local agencies or businesses within the valley.

The NASA Jet Propulsion Laboratory uses InSAR to remotely measure topographic change over time. In a monitoring study from May 2015 to September 2016, NASA found areas that were subsiding as rapidly as two feet per year. The data also revealed that southern El Nido and Corcoran, California were experiencing the most rapid sinking in a bowl shaped manner.

In the Sacramento Valley, the DWR reports using GPS surveys to study elevation changes in a study known as the Sacramento Valley Height–Modernization Project. Their study includes 339 survey monuments throughout the valley. The DWR also has eleven borehole extensometers to collect detailed information at designated sites. The GPS survey gives a broad picture of change, and the borehole extensometers can focus on key areas.

The USGS collects and synthesizes data from other agencies to make reports on land subsidence in the valley. They use InSAR data from NASA's Jet Propulsion Laboratory in conjunction with interferograms to interpret the topographic change captured by satellite imagery. Continuous Global Positioning Survey station data from UNAVCO, Scripps Orbit and Permanent Array Center, Caltrans, and others are obtained for topography changes over a large region. Spirit Leveling data from the DWR, Delta-Mendota Water Authority, the Central California Irrigation District, and others are used to measure elevation change in a smaller area. The USGS uses the data from borehole extensometers provided by the DWR, and also utilizes information from piezometers to track changes in groundwater.

As of 2018, the USGS has been using large hexagonal-shaped sensor rigged to a helicopter to measure groundwater salinity and map underground aquifers in the San Joaquin Valley. These sensors work by sending in small electromagnetic waves into the subsurface level, and receiving information as these waves are returned.

Key components of studying land subsidence in the Central Valley include large and small scale monitoring, studying topography in relation to groundwater, and a multi-agency approach. Discoveries made by monitoring may allow for better mitigation practices and policies to prevent subsidence.

Specific to the Central Valley Aqueduct system, the USGS has implemented the Central Valley Hydrologic Model (CVHM) to closely analyze and predict the changes in groundwater levels and consequential land subsidence. The CVHM considers surface level water supply to estimate groundwater use, as well as monitoring recharge rates. Updates and improvements have been made to the CVHM since its creation. For example, the contribution of groundwater recharge from un-gaged watersheds to the Central Valley Aquifer were previously not contributed in the model for the 1961–2009 data analysis. Changes such as this are being made to improve the accuracy of the model.

== Infrastructure damage ==
Infrastructure damage caused by accelerated land subsidence threatens the effectiveness of many dams and canals sourcing surface water to the central valley. Damage has been noted in the California Aqueduct system and is attributed to the rate at which the valley floor is settling. In a 2019 study, researchers found that stretches of the California Aqueduct had sunk in a way that have caused up to 20% loss in carrying capacity of water. Building foundations, pipelines, and other infrastructure may be at risk of damage as well. Areas with substantial subsidence may be at higher risk of flooding. This is in large part due to the levee designed to prevent flood risk are typically in high-subsidence areas. The Delta-Mendota Canal and Chowchilla Basin are evidence of this in the Central Valley. With California introducing the Sustainable Groundwater Management Act in 2014, new estimations of subsidence based on water usage plans have revealed that stretches of the California Aqueduct are still at a substantially high risk of subsidence. These projections range from 10–15 feet (3.0–4.6 m) of subsidence in the most at risk areas.

The Friant-Kern Canal and the Delta-Mendota Canal are two of four projects that are being considered for repaired from subsidence damages. For example, Senate Bill 559 sought to provide over $400 million in funds to repair the Friant-Kern Canal. However, Governor Newsom vetoed the bill in search of broader state-wide solutions to subsidence damage. With some facilities and water transport infrastructure being federally owned and operated and some state owned and operated, it often requires the collaboration of the State Water Board and DWR to organize and fund repair projects.

== Groundwater recharge ==
Groundwater recharge is the process of allowing excess surface water to swap into underground aquifers. Groundwater recharge is vital to mitigating subsidence and minimizes the consequential damage. The amount of recharge that occurs in the San Joaquin Valley is very dependent on the amount of rain received in winter and spring months and county policy. Roughly 55% of groundwater in the San Joaquin Valley is recharged via local precipitation, while 45% is recharged via river water recharge. Various central valley agencies utilize basins for artificial recharge of the aquifer. The prototype for this method was Leaky Acres Recharge Facility in Fresno.

Madera Irrigation District reported that they were able to restore 2,500 acre-feet (3.1 million cubic meters) of water in 2017 to aquifers by releasing unused irrigation water onto flood land available to them. They reported that some growers also released excess water allotted to them on flood lands to help restore aquifers. This practice mitigates overutilization of surface water.

== See also ==
- Sinking cities – Cities endangered by environmental change
- UNESCO Working Group on Land Subsidence
