= Water reuse in California =

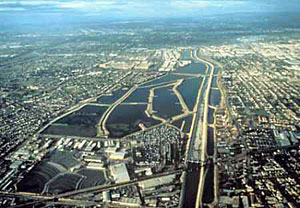
Montebello Forebay Ground Water Recharge Project in Los Angeles, California

Water reuse in California is the use of reclaimed water for beneficial use. As a heavily populated state in the drought-prone arid west, water reuse is developing as an integral part of water in California enabling both the economy and population to grow.

== Wastewater ==
Reclaimed water is treated wastewater that comes from homes and businesses, such as sink water, shower water, and toilet water including everything dumped into wastewater drains from laundry soap to bleach to oil to human waste. Wastewater can be divided into greywater and blackwater, with the first being defined as water that had been used for laundry, bathing, sink washing, and dishwashers. Blackwater is defined as sewage that includes feces from toilets. Due to the low amounts of physical pollutants in greywater, most of its contaminants are dissolved organic matter, which can be physically filtered and cleaned through various membranes, as well as through biological treatment methods.

The subsequent heterogeneous solution is collected through pipes and the sewer system, and is then treated at a wastewater treatment plant to the standard required according to its intended use. Historically, this recycled water has been used for agriculture, large-scale landscaping, industrial processes like cooling systems, and groundwater recharge. Future infrastructure for water reuse may include washing laundry and cars or watering lawns and flushing our toilets, in addition to use in municipal infrastructure for street cleaning, fountains, and commercial use. Water in California is to be used 'reasonably' under the Reasonable Use doctrine, and not reusing water when possible constitutes a violation of this doctrine pursuant to Water Code sections 13550 et seq. according to the State Water Resources Control Board. Water reuse in California has more than tripled since the 1970s, growing from less than 200,000 acre-feet per year to nearly 700,000 in 2009.

== History ==
Water is a limiting factor to both economic and population growth in California. Californians have been reusing water for much of its history. As early as the 1800s, California farmers were using municipal wastewater from nearby urban areas for irrigation. In the early 1900s, the city of Pasadena purchased a plot of land outside the city and named it Pasadena Sewer Farm, where walnuts, corn, pumpkins, and hay were grown at a profit. Cities in the state began using sewage for irrigation, recognizing it as a source of water and nutrients in an arid California. Around the same time, the city of San Francisco began using raw sewage for irrigation to create Golden Gate Park, an area which was just sand dunes. Concerns were raised about public health risks of using sewage for irrigation eventually leading to the first state law regarding the reuse of municipal wastewater in 1918. After building a treatment plant near Golden Gate Park, artificial lakes and streams were also created with the treated water. In Fresno, in the 1920s, the state's first potable groundwater recharge system using wastewater was established.

After World War II, the population of Southern California increased dramatically, and groundwater in the area had been over-exploited to the point of creating saltwater intrusion from the Pacific Ocean, rendering the local groundwater non-potable. In their attempt to develop technology to desalinate ocean water, engineers discovered that their technology was more efficient and cost-effective when applied on brackish water.

In 1961, a wastewater treatment plant was opened in Los Angeles, where reverse osmosis was used to treat sewage and stormwater. The treated water was applied to a sandy basin, where it was further treated by natural means and percolated down into the groundwater, which was in turn pumped back up for use as drinking water. In 1965, San Diego County created man-made lakes using treated sewage for recreational activities, including swimming and fishing. In 1976, with their groundwater contaminated by saltwater intrusion, Orange County opened Water Factory 21, where they used reverse osmosis to treat wastewater, and then inject it into the ground to be used as a hydraulic saltwater barrier for the area's overdrawn groundwater aquifers. Since the 1970s, water reuse has more than tripled.

In 2013, San Diego demonstrated the feasibility of using technology to recycle most of their wastewater for reuse by the year 2035, to decrease costs of importing water. This project, Pure Water San Diego, hopes to build facilities throughout the county to treat wastewater to provide for sustainable, safe potable water for one-third of the population. As of 2011, the city has been purifying millions of gallons of water and giving demonstrations to the public upon request.

== Technology ==
=== Early technology ===
The earliest water reuse comprised simply of trenches dug to transport wastewater outside of urban areas to farms where it was used for fertilizer and water. Pipes were soon built to contain the smell of the wastewater. In the 1930s, San Francisco built McQueen Treatment Plant near Golden Gate Park to treat the wastewater it was using to irrigate the landscape. This technology included aerating the wastewater to allow bacteria to work on the effluent, as well as adding chlorine to kill off any remaining pathogens.

=== Treatment levels ===
- Primary: A physical process of removing solids from the heterogenous solution, but will still have organic material.
- Secondary: Biological process of removing organic matter and suspended material.
- Tertiary: Can involve physical and chemical processes to further remove organic matter, suspended material, and nutrients like nitrogen and phosphorus.

Physical treatments include coarse sand, sedimentation, and screening through membranes and filters. Chemical treatments include ion exchange and coagulation. Biological processes include the use of ultraviolet for disinfection, membrane bioreactors, RBC, and SBR.

=== Reverse osmosis ===
Reverse osmosis is a water purification technology that uses a semipermeable membrane to remove ions, molecules, and larger particles from drinking water. Currently, reverse osmosis is the technology by which water reuse is made possible, in conjunction with filtering methods for larger solids (e.g., screens and settling tanks), other techniques for removing smaller particulates (e.g., aeration to allow bacteria to metabolize the suspended matter), and chlorination to kill any remaining harmful bacteria. Reverse osmosis can also remove dissolved solids, color, pesticides, nutrients, and pathogens.

=== Other ===
Other methods for treating water include UV disinfection, oxidation, and electrodialysis reversal for salinity.

== Current uses and applications ==
Water reuse has been an important part of California's water plan due to efforts to reduce over-drafted ground and surface water supplies, but also as a safe and environmentally responsible means of waste disposal. It also helps to address the unique challenge that California faces in providing water to its densely populated cities and millions of acres of farmland in areas where precipitation scarcely falls. In 2012, California reused nearly three quarters of a million acre feet of water, enough for about three million Californians for the year.

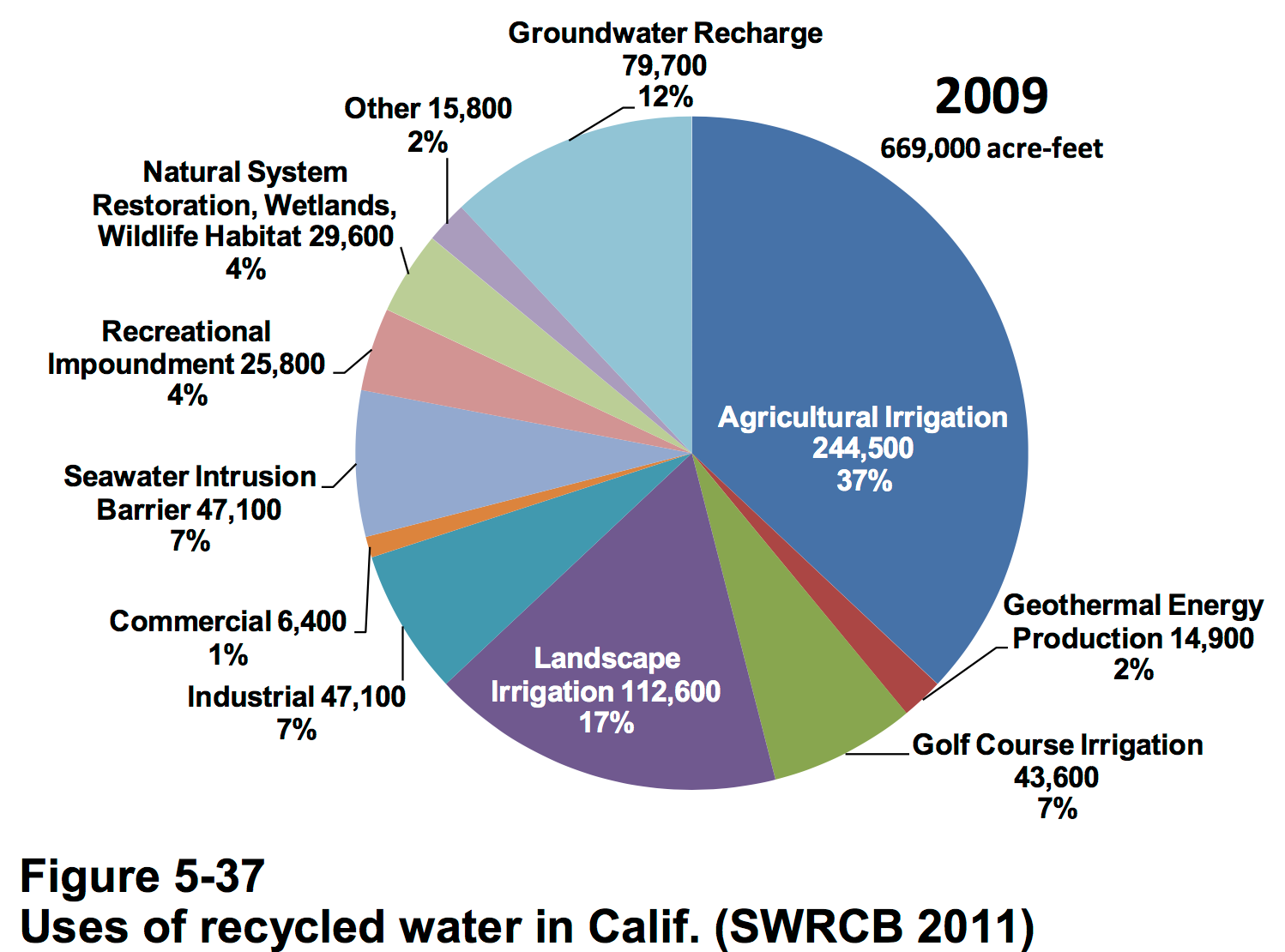

=== Irrigation ===
Irrigation of farms and landscapes accounts for the greatest use of recycled water in California, more than 60%, with agriculture alone accounting for nearly 40%. Given that agriculture uses 80% of developed water supply in California, this reduces strain on natural freshwater supplies. Water must be treated to at least the secondary level in order to be used in agriculture in California. In cases where the recycled water will not have contact with the edible portion of the plant, like in orchards or vineyards, secondary treatment is deemed sufficient, but in the case of crops with the edible portion of the plant having contact with the recycled water tertiary treatment is regulated.

=== Groundwater recharge ===
The second largest use of recycled water in California is groundwater recharge. To some extent, water reuse as a seawater intrusion barrier is also groundwater recharge. Treated wastewater is injected into underground aquifers, or in some cases spread over a surface of land and allowed to percolate down into aquifers below, where it can later be extracted to be added to the urban water supply. Groundwater recharge is regulated by the California State Water Resources Control Board (SWRCB), California Department of Public Health (DPH), California Public Utilities Commission (PUC), and the California Department of Water Resources (DWR).

There are four large-scale groundwater recharge operations in southern California that inject treated wastewater directly into potable water aquifers. They include Orange County Groundwater Replenishment System, West Basin Municipal Water District Edward C. Little Water Recycling Facility, Los Angeles Bureau of Sanitation Terminal Island Water Reclamation Plant, and the Water Replenishment District of Southern California Leo J. Vander Lans Water Treatment Facility. In contrast, the Montebello Forebay facility spreads water on the surface of the ground to recharge the aquifer.

There are many groundwater recharge operations in the central valley of varying sizes. The City of Fresno proved the concept with their Leaky Acres Recharge Facility experiment in 1971.

=== Industrial use ===
Use of recycled water in industrial settings is increasing as strained freshwater supplies are decreasing. Recycled water is used industrially in pulp and paper plants and in the cooling towers and boilers of power plants. It can also be used for mixing concrete and other applications that do not involve consumption by humans. This is an attractive option for California industries, given the high cost of unrecycled fresh water. Additionally, water need not be treated to very high standards to be use in industrial applications, and this makes it an even more cost-effective solution. West Basin Municipal Water District's Edward C. Little Water Recycling Facility has been providing recycled water to industrial customers since 1995.

=== Ecosystem support ===
Treated wastewater is used in California to support aquatic ecosystems, like wetlands, rivers, and lakes. This can be for the purposes of habitat restoration, water flow augmentations, and water quantity and quality maintenance. Lake Elsinore of Lake Elsinore City loses 14,000 acre feet of water a year from evaporation, and in 2002 the city decided to augment the dwindling lake with recycled water.

== Challenges ==
=== Technical ===
There are some technical challenges in water reuse, among which are making start-up more economical, questions about water quality standards, long-term effects of pharmaceutical and household chemicals leftover in the water after treatment (constituents of emerging concern), and a lack of infrastructure to carry out water reuse. Although there has been little documentation of adverse effects to humans from water reuse contact or consumption, there remains concern about long-term effects of endocrine disrupters, pharmaceuticals, household chemicals, and personal care products in reused water, including impacts on the natural and beneficial microbiota found on and inside people. Treating water to a degree that would be free of these contaminants is expensive, and, for recycled water that is introduced into a groundwater aquifer, it would include the use of multiple barriers and mediums for removal of the microbiological and chemical contaminants. Furthermore, all wastewater that is added to the groundwater supply must be highly treated just in case it has these potentially dangerous contaminants. Monitoring is a critical step in these processes as well.

In September 2016, the California State Water Resources Control Board published a report for public comment entitled, "Investigation on the Feasibility of Developing Uniform Water Recycling Criteria for Direct Potable Reuse". Among many other points, this report clearly states that there is no established and reliable technology to even measure these 'constituents of emerging concern' collectively, as opposed to one by one with expensive techniques, and they cannot be effectively monitored via Chemical Oxygen Demand (COD), Biological Oxygen Demand (BOD), or Total Organic Carbon (TOC).

An alternative to preemptively highly treating all water in case of contaminants for use in the drinking water supply is a dual piping system in which gray and black water are kept separate from the initial point of disposal to the treatment phase and the treated blackwater is used for non-potable reuses, as it is more likely to have higher concentrations of the potentially more harmful contaminants, while the treated graywater can be used for more sensitive purposes. For example, the blackwater from toilets can be kept separate, be treated to the point that it no longer has odor, color or pathogens, and be reused to flush the same toilets indefinitely, in a closed-loop system, since the water in the toilet bowl is not consumed. Other closed-loop recycling systems would also be entirely feasible, for example in laundries and car washes. This requires costly new infrastructure, but it will pay for itself via savings in water and health. The general consensus is that new infrastructure will be required regardless moving into the next few decades.

=== Social ===
People are naturally concerned with water reuse, and the concept of contagions in the water is difficult to overcome. Water after just one use has long been considered waste, but, as water resources decline in the face of increasing populations, this mindset will need to be changed, because water reuse will continue to be implemented on a greater scale. Education will be an important factor in addressing these social challenges. The City of San Diego Water Purification Demonstration Project spent nearly half of its budget on public outreach and education in 2005.

== Economics ==
The geographical inequity in the distribution of water and precipitation in California makes it such that water reuse is more economical in the southern half, which receives less than one third of the precipitation of the state. In the face of groundwater overdraft, declining snowpack, changing climate, increased drought and high temperatures, some Southern California cities have found water reuse to be a cost-effective way to augment their water supply. The initial costs of building a wastewater treatment plant can be more expensive than other methods of attaining water (e.g., groundwater or imported water), but it's much less costly than desalination. Once the facility is established, however, recycled water is less expensive than fresh, for use in industry or power generation. Furthermore, as freshwater supplies continue to dwindle, the cost of freshwater will go up, and the price differential will increase. As the cost of treating water goes up as the level of treatment goes up so it is more economically viable to treat water for irrigation purposes than for potable uses. In some cases, recycled water can reduce the need for fertilizers, further adding to the viability of water reuse.

== Future ==
The future of water reuse in California is expansion. With the population of California expected to nearly double by 2055 and with the anticipated effects of climate change in an already water-strained state, water reuse will continue to be an integral part of California's water story. The State Water Resources Control Board has laid out plans for the increased "use of recycled water over 2002 levels by at least one million acre⋅ft (1.2 billion m^{3}) per year by 2020 and by at least two million acre⋅ft (2.5 billion m^{3}) per year by 2030." The DWR reviews and updates the California Water Plan every 5 years. As of 2013, priority funding was given to new projects in the state that incorporated water reuse.

== See also ==
- Ecological sanitation
- Sewage treatment
- Sustainable sanitation
- Urine-diverting dry toilet
