= Droughts in California =

Percent area in U.S. drought monitor categories

The historical and ongoing periodic droughts in California result from various complex meteorological phenomena, some of which are not fully understood by scientists.

Drought is generally defined as "a deficiency of precipitation over an extended period of time (usually a season or more), resulting in a water shortage."

A lack of rainfall (or snowfall) or precipitation in meager quantities, higher than average temperatures and dry air masses in the atmosphere commonly underlie drought conditions; these natural factors are further complicated by increases in populations and water demands. Since the California water supply is attained from numerous sources, fulfilled by varied and intricate weather patterns, there is no one cause of drought. California is not only the most populous state and largest agricultural producer in the United States, it is also the most biodiverse; as such, drought in California can have a far reaching economic and environmental impacts.

There are five major technical categories of drought: (1) Meteorological, (2) Agricultural, (3) Hydrological, (4) Socioeconomic, and (5) Ecological. A meteorological drought may be short lived without causing disturbance; but when longer lasting may enter other categories according to its impacts. In addition to technical categories, Governor Gavin Newsom and his administration introduced in 2023 the concept of a political drought, where state public policy actions would need to continue even after short-term drought conditions may have ameliorated.

Precipitation in California occurs mostly from November to May, with the vast majority of rain and snowfall across the state occurring during the winter months. This delicate balance means that a dry rainy season can have lasting consequences.

== Climate ==
Drought is intrinsic to the natural climate of California. Across the Californian region, paleoclimate records dating back more than 1,000 years show more significant dry periods compared to the latest century. Ancient data reveals two mega-droughts that endured for well over a century, one lasting 220 years and one for 140 years. The 20th century was fraught with numerous droughts, yet this era could be considered relatively "wet" compared against an expansive 3,500 year history. In recent times, droughts lasting five to 10 years have raised concern, but are not anomalous. Rather, decade long droughts are an ordinary feature of the state's innate climate. Based on scientific evidence, dry spells as severe as the mega-droughts detected from the distant past are likely to recur, even in absence of anthropogenic climate change.

== Climate change ==
According to the Intergovernmental Panel on Climate Change or IPCC, their Sixth Assessment Report (AR6) on the effects of climate change revealed a number of scientifically supported claims on what is to become the future of the earth. While variability in climate patterns are a natural occurrence, AR6 concluded that human influences have increased the chance of compound extreme weather events, specifically "increases in the frequency of concurrent heatwaves and droughts on the global scale" with high confidence.

According to the NOAA Drought Task Force report of 2014, the drought is not part of a long-term change in precipitation and was a symptom of the natural variability, although the record-high temperature that accompanied the recent drought may have been amplified due to human-induced global warming. This was confirmed by a 2015 scientific study which estimated that global warming "accounted for 8–27% of the observed drought anomaly in 2012–2014. Although natural variability dominates, anthropogenic warming has substantially increased the overall likelihood of extreme California droughts." A study published in 2016 found that the net effect of climate change has made agricultural droughts less likely, with the authors also stating that "Our results indicate that the current severe impacts of drought on California’s agricultural sector, its forests, and other plant ecosystems have not been substantially caused by long-term climate change."

Drought phases are integral to the climate of California. Furthermore, global La Niña or El Nino, or Neutral ENSO, meteorological events are generally associated with drier and hotter conditions and further exacerbation of droughts in California and the Southwestern and to some extent Southeastern United States. Meteorological scientists have observed that La Niñas have become more frequent over time.

Increasingly dramatic fluctuations in California weather have been observed in the 21st century. In 2015, California experienced its lowest snowpack in at least 500 years; the 2012–15 period was the driest in at least 1200 years. However, the winter of 2016–17 was the wettest ever recorded in Northern California, surpassing the previous record set in 1982–83. In February 2017, Shasta, Oroville and Folsom Lakes were simultaneously dumping water into the ocean for flood control. Lake Oroville flowed over the emergency spillway for the first time in 48 years, after the main spillway was damaged resulting in the temporary evacuation of 200,000 people. The combined inflow to Shasta, Oroville and Folsom Lakes on February 9 was 764,445 acre-feet (0.942929 km^{3}). Two days later, the combined flood control release was 370,260 acre-feet (0.45671 km^{3}). This water would have been worth $370M at Los Angeles County municipal rates.

== Policy ==
In 2023, The [F]law blamed corporate agriculture for exacerbating problems in the water supply, noting that California farms "are large corporations with large amounts of capital and political power," and that the public water districts "are completely dominated by members of the agriculture industry and spend millions of dollars every year lobbying." In 2025, a California farmer profiled by AgWeb blamed an exacerbation of drought effects on decades of state decisions prioritizing wildlife and neglecting infrastructure. The American Institute for Economic Research concluded in 2026 that "California’s water shortage is essentially the product of government policy—decades of price suppression, subsidizing waste, and allocating water according to political rules rather than economic value."

== Dry years ==
Throughout recent recorded history, California has experienced periodic droughts, such as 1841, 1864, 1895, 1924, 1928–1935, 1947–1950, 1959–1961, 1976–1977, 1986–1992, 2007–2009, and 2011–2017,2020–2022 and 2024-25.

Since 1841, the following dry years have had significantly below-average precipitation.

- 1841
- 1863–1864
- 1895–1896
- 1917–1921
- 1922–1926
- 1928–1937
- 1943–1951
- 1959–1961
- 1971–1972
- 1976–1977
- 1987–1992
- 1999–2004
- 2006–2009
- 2011–2017
- 2020–2022
- 2024–2025

=== 1841 ===
The drought was sufficiently severe that a settler's account of the time claimed that the Sonoma area was "entirely unsuitable for agriculture".

=== 1863–1864 ===
This drought was preceded by the torrential floods of 1861–1862.

=== 1924 ===
This drought encouraged farmers to start using irrigation more regularly. Because of the fluctuation in California weather, the need for consistent water availability was crucial for farmers.

=== 1928–1937 ===
This drought occurred during the historical Dust Bowl period that characterized much of the plains region of the United States in the 1920s and 1930s. The Central Valley Project was started in the 1930s in response to drought.

=== 1950s ===
The 1950s drought contributed to the creation of the State Water Project.

=== 1976–77 ===
1977 had been the driest year in state history to date. According to the Los Angeles Times, "Drought in the 1970s spurred efforts at urban conservation and the state's Drought Emergency Water Bank came out of drought in the 1980s.".

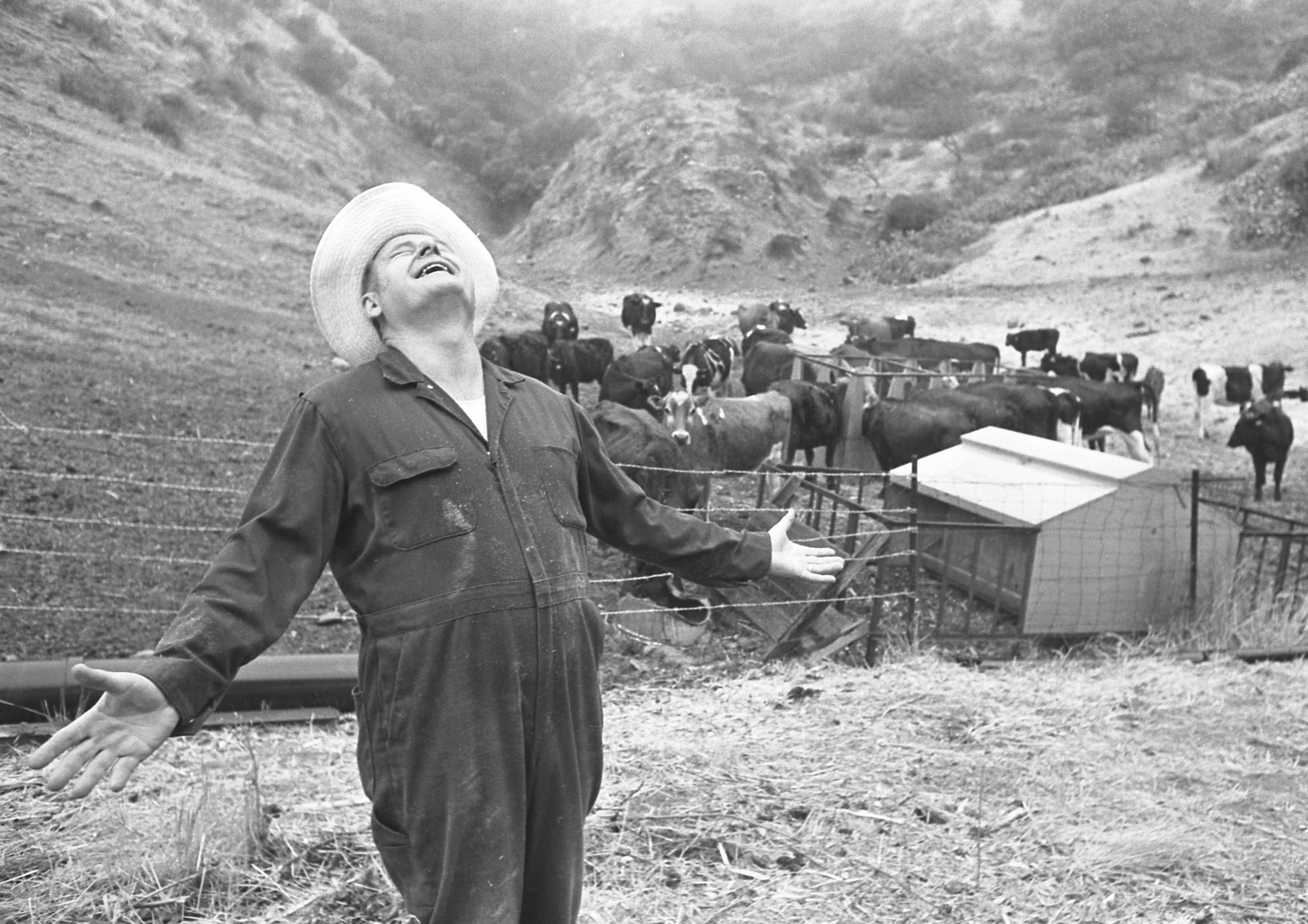
A farmer welcoming rain during the 1976 drought.

Additionally as drought prediction was essentially random and in response to recent severe drought years, in 1977 the U.S. Department of the Interior, Office of Water Research and Technology contracted Entropy Limited for an exploratory study of the applicability of the entropy minimax method of statistical analysis of multivariate data to the problem of determining the conditional probability of drought one or two years into the future, with the area of special interest being California. Christensen et al. (1980) demonstrated an information-theoretic model predicted the probability that precipitation will be below or above average with modest but statistically significant skill one, two and even three years into the future. It was this pioneering work that discovered the influence of El Nino-Southern Oscillation on US weather forecasting.

=== 1986–1992 ===
California endured one of its longest droughts ever, observed from late 1986 through late 1992. Drought worsened in 1988 as much of the United States also suffered from severe drought. In California, the six-year drought ended in late 1992 as a significant El Niño event in the Pacific Ocean (and the eruption of Mount Pinatubo in June 1991) most likely caused unusual persistent heavy rains.

=== 2007–2009 ===
2007–2009 saw three years of drought conditions, the 12th worst drought period in the state's history, and the first drought for which a statewide proclamation of emergency was issued. The drought of 2007–2009 also saw greatly reduced water diversions from the state water project. The summer of 2007 saw some of the worst wildfires in Southern California history.

=== 2011–2017 ===
2011-2017 was the longest drought in California beginning December 2011 and ending March 2017.

Progression of the drought from December 2013 to July 2014

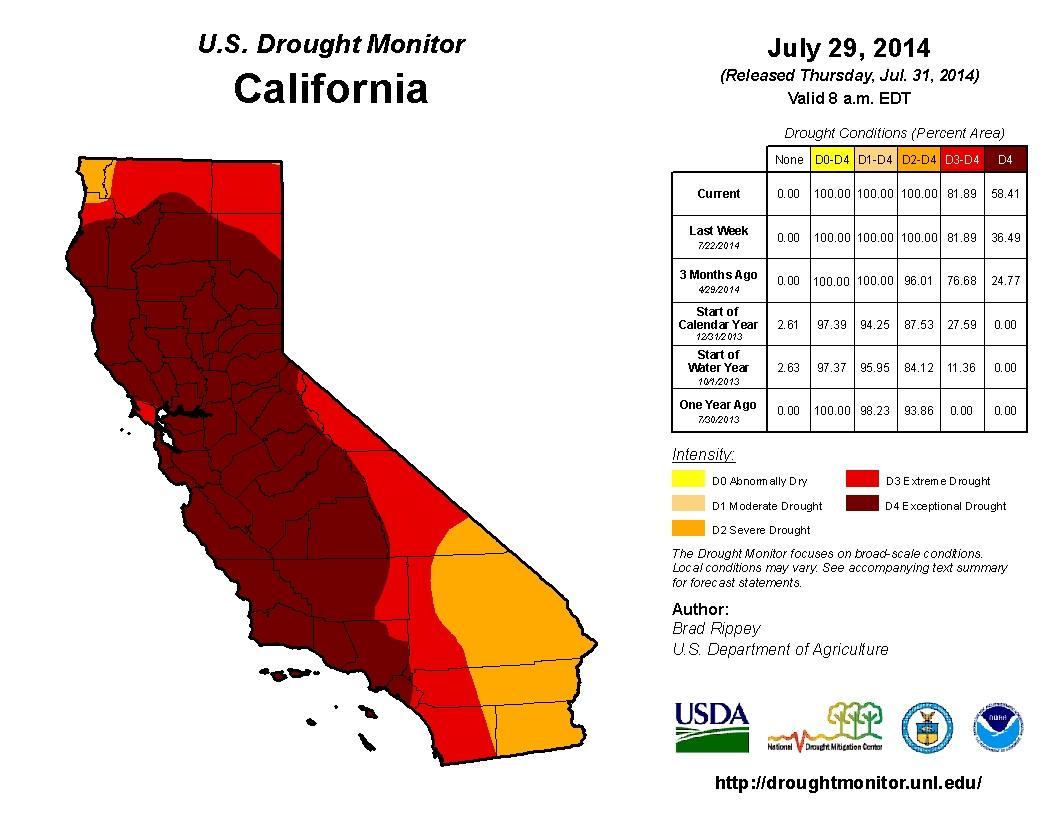
Drought peak in late July 2014

The period between late 2011 and 2014 was the driest in California history since record-keeping began. In May 2015, a state resident poll conducted by Field Poll found that two out of three respondents agreed that it should be mandated for water agencies to reduce water consumption by 25%.

The 2015 prediction of El Niño to bring rains to California raised hopes of ending the drought. In the spring of 2015, the National Oceanic and Atmospheric Administration named the probability of the presence of El Niño conditions until the end of 2015 at 80%. Historically, El Niño conditions were present during sixteen winters between 1951 and 2015. Six of those had below-average rainfall, five had average rainfall, and five had above-average rainfall. However, as of May 2015, drought conditions had worsened and above average ocean temperatures had not resulted in large storms.

The drought led to Governor Jerry Brown's instituting mandatory 25 percent water restrictions in June 2015.

Many millions of California trees died from the drought – approximately 102 million, including 62 million in 2016 alone. By the end of 2016, 30% of California had emerged from the drought, mainly in the northern half of the state, while 40% of the state remained in the extreme or exceptional drought levels. Heavy rains in January 2017 were expected to have a significant benefit to the state's northern water reserves, despite widespread power outages and erosional damage in the wake of the deluge. Among the casualties of the rain was 1,000 year-old Pioneer Cabin Tree in Calaveras Big Trees State Park, which toppled on January 8, 2017.

The winter of 2016–17 turned out to be the wettest on record in Northern California, surpassing the previous record set in 1982–83. Floodwaters caused severe damage to Oroville Dam in early February, prompting the temporary evacuation of nearly 200,000 people north of Sacramento. In response to the heavy precipitation, which flooded multiple rivers and filled most of the state's major reservoirs, Governor Brown declared an official end to the drought on April 7.

== Effects ==
=== Short-term effects ===
The runoff from rainfall used to support many aspects of California infrastructure, such as agriculture and municipal use, will be severely diminished during the drought. While groundwater diminishes at a much lower rate than runoff, the lack of runoff will lead to increased groundwater pumping to meet the needs of the water demand. If groundwater is being pumped at a rate higher than it can be replenished by precipitation then groundwater levels will begin to fall and the quality of water will also decrease. With that said the relationship between surface water and groundwater contribute to the hydrologic system, and groundwater helps maintain surface water flows during extended dry periods. With both sources diminishing, the quality and availability of water will decrease. People can become ill from lack of water.

=== Long-term effects ===
Excessive ground water pumping and aquifer depletion will lead to land sinking and permanent loss of groundwater storage. Decreasing groundwater levels lead to exposing of underground water storage areas, this will cause lack of soil structure strength and possible sinking if the land above is heavy enough. This has already begun in certain parts of the state during the most recent drought. In coastal communities, excessive water pumping can lead to sea water intrusion, which means sea water will begin to flow into the underground water storage areas that were vacated by excess pumping. This can cause decreased water quality and lead to an expensive desalination effort to clean the water before distribution. Water flows through wildlife refuges and national parks can decrease or stop all together due to the decrease of surface and groundwater, the California Water Science Center is a part of a team trying to restore and maintain water flow in these at risk areas. With reduction of water flow and increased windy or dry weather, wildfire risks increase; lightning strikes or accidental human mistake can lead to huge wildfires due to the drier-than-normal climate.

== Possible adaptations ==
Adaptation is the process of adjusting to circumstances, which means not trying to stop the drought, but trying to preserve the water given the drought conditions. This is the most used option, because stopping a drought is difficult given that it is a meteorological process. Adapting to the problem using innovation and problem solving is often the cheaper and more useful way to go because trying to change the natural processes of the earth could have unforeseen consequences.

Much of the water used in California comes from the Colorado River. By usage, ~79% of the river goes to crop irrigation (70% of which is cattle feed), ~13% to residential water usage, ~4% for commercial use, and ~4% for thermal power plants. Below are some of the proposed ways to reduce usage from those areas or to add new water from other sources

- Water desalination
- Recycling waste water
- Recirculating water that flows through rivers merely for EPA flow augmentation, natural beauty, habitat diversity, etc.
- Installing pumps and canals to move water from overflowing lakes to those that are not expected to otherwise fill up.
- Increased ground water storage
- Increased surface water storage
- Elimination of swimming pools (or maintaining and covering them so the water does not leak or evaporate)
- Elimination of golf courses and other facilities which use a tremendous amount of water
- Elimination of high water use crops such as alfalfa, almond groves, and wine vineyards
- Sourcing food ingredients from states that are not in drought (especially when these ingredients are otherwise exported from California).
- Repairing and replacing fragile levees

== Infrastructure issues ==
A precipitation shortage leaves less water in the state's water infrastructure systems, leading to debates on how to best make use of this limited resource.

=== Lack of new infrastructure ===
Very few large-scale water projects have been built since 1979, despite the population doubling since that year.

=== Inefficient distribution systems ===
Because much of California's water network relies on a system of pumps to move water from north to south, large volumes of water are often lost to the Pacific Ocean during winter storms when river flow exceeds the capacity of the pumps. This is further complicated by environmental rules which restrict pumping during certain months of the year, to protect migrating fish. In water year 2015, 9,400,000 acre-feet (11.6 km^{3}) of water flowed through the Sacramento–San Joaquin River Delta, but only 1,900,000 acre-feet (2.3 km^{3}) were recovered into water distribution systems.

=== Reservoir capacity reserved for flood control ===
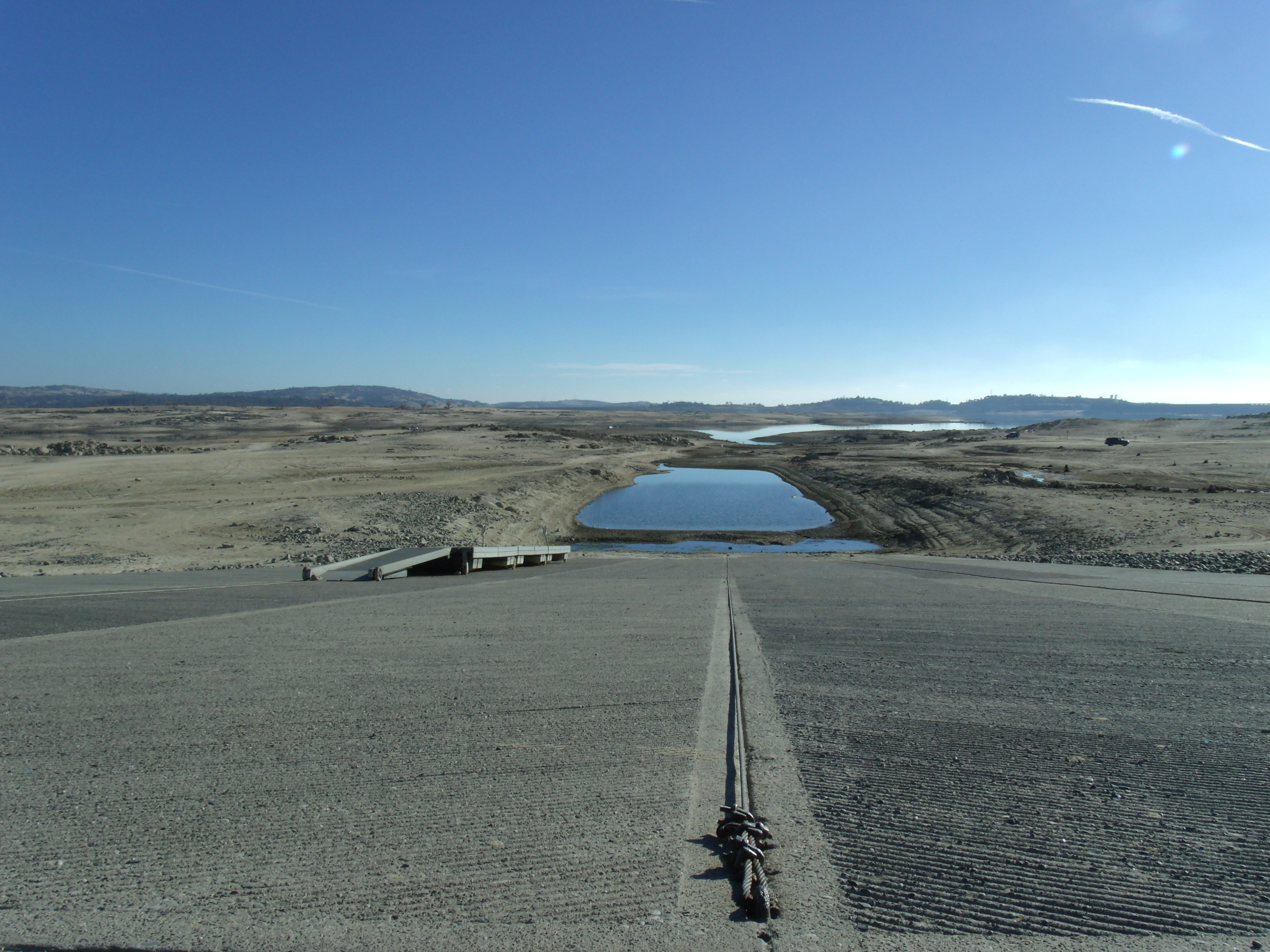
Dry boat ramp at Folsom Lake, January 2014

Most of California's major reservoirs serve important flood control functions. Due to the limited capacity of river channels and dam spillways, reservoirs cannot be quickly drained before major storms. This limits how much of a reservoir's capacity can be used for long-term storage. Reservoirs in California are designed to control either rain floods, snowmelt floods or both.

In the coastal and southern parts of the state, and much of the Sacramento River system, the primary threat is rain floods in the November–April wet season. Oceanic "atmospheric river" or Pineapple Express storms can generate massive precipitation in a short period (often up to 50 percent of the total annual rainfall in just a few storms). This requires a certain safety margin to be maintained in reservoirs, which are often not allowed to capacity until late April or May. Shasta Lake, California's largest reservoir, is limited to approximately 71 percent of capacity in the winter in order to control rain flooding. Levees along Northern California rivers, such as the Sacramento and American rivers, are quite generously sized in order to pass large volumes of floodwater.

In the San Joaquin River basin (San Joaquin Valley) and other areas of the state where snowpack is the primary source of river flow, river channels are sized mainly to control snowmelt floods, which do not produce the huge peaks typical of rain floods, but are longer in duration and have a much higher total volume. As a result, reservoirs in this region have very strict restrictions on the amount of water that can be released. An example of a reservoir operated for snow floods is Pine Flat Lake near Fresno, which is restricted to about 53 percent capacity well into spring in order to capture summer snowmelt. However, Pine Flat and other San Joaquin reservoirs are frequently ineffectual in controlling rain floods, because they cannot release water fast enough between winter storms.

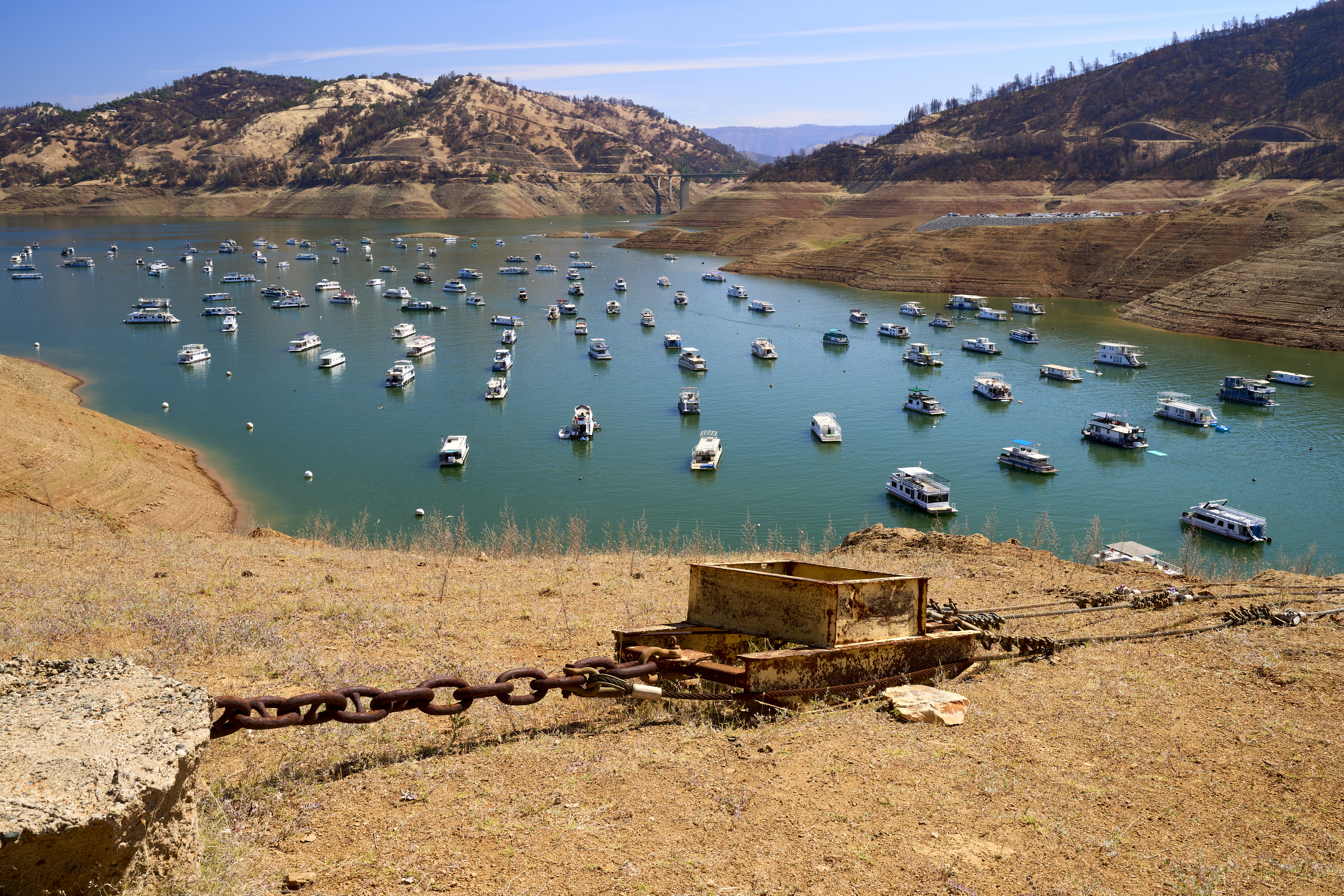
In May 2021, water levels of Lake Oroville dropped to 38% of capacity. The boats are dwarfed by the exposed banks while California is headed into another drought year.

Certain parts of the state, especially in the central Sierra Nevada, are prone to both rain and snow floods. Reservoirs such as Lake Oroville and Folsom Lake must respond to a wider range of runoff conditions. Lake Oroville is typically limited to 79–89 percent of capacity during the winter and Folsom Lake to 33–60 percent. These values are often adjusted up and down based on the amount of rain and snow forecast. At Folsom Lake, due to the small size of the reservoir, it is difficult to balance the need for winter flood-control space with the need to store water for the summer. This often results in a failure to fill the lake due to a lower than expected spring snowmelt. Water managers and hydrology experts have criticized the outdated, overly conservative operation criteria at Folsom Dam, citing improved weather forecasting and snowpack measurement technology.

Progress in forecasting methods has allowed more efficient or "smart" operation at certain California reservoirs, such as Lake Mendocino. If dry weather is forecast, water is allowed to be stored above the legal flood control limit, rather than being wasted downstream. This program is known as "Forecast Informed Reservoir Operations". In addition, capital improvements such as the $900 million spillway project at Folsom Dam will allow greater flexibility in water releases, making it safer to maintain a high reservoir level during the wet season.

Flood control limitations at selected California reservoirs
Reservoir	River	Capacity		Max. flood control reservation		Percent of total capacity reserved for flood control	Target flood water release	
		Acre feet	km^{3}	Acre feet	km^{3}		ft^{3}/s	m^{3}/s
Shasta Lake	Sacramento River	4,552,000	5.615	1,300,000	1.6	28.5%	79,000	2,200
Lake Oroville	Feather River	3,540,000	4.37	750,000	0.93	21.1%	150,000	4,200
New Bullards Bar Reservoir	Yuba River	966,000	1.192	170,000	0.21	17.6%	50,000	1,400
Folsom Lake	American River	977,000	1.205	670,000	0.83	68.5%	115,000	3,300
Camanche Lake	Mokelumne River	417,000	0.514	200,000	0.25	48.0%	5,000	140
New Hogan Lake	Calaveras River	317,000	0.391	165,000	0.204	52.1%	12,500	350
New Melones Lake	Stanislaus River	2,420,000	2.99	450,000	0.56	18.6%	8,000	230
Lake Don Pedro	Tuolumne River	2,030,000	2.50	340,000	0.42	16.7%	9,000	250
Lake McClure	Merced River	1,025,000	1.264	350,000	0.43	34.2%	6,000	170
Millerton Lake	San Joaquin River	521,000	0.643	391,000	0.482	75.0%	8,000	230
Pine Flat Lake	Kings River	1,000,000	1.2	475,000	0.586	47.5%	7,950	225
Lake Isabella	Kern River	568,000	0.701	398,000	0.491	70.1%	4,600	130

=== Weather cycles ===
California has one of the most variable climates of any U.S. state, and often experiences very wet years followed by extremely dry ones. The state's reservoirs have insufficient capacity to balance the water supply between wet and dry years.

El Niño and La Niña have often been associated with wet and dry cycles in California, respectively (the 1982–83 El Niño event, one of the strongest in history, brought record precipitation to the state), but recent climate data show mixed evidence for such a relationship due in part to the growing impact of human-induced global warming. The very wet 2010–2011 season occurred during a strong La Niña phase, while the 2014–16 El Niño event, which surpassed 1982–83 in intensity, did not bring an appreciable increase of precipitation to the state.

The 2012–15 North American drought was caused by conditions of the Arctic oscillation and North Atlantic oscillation which removed storms from the U.S. in the winter of 2011–2012.

=== Large water consumers ===
- Approximately 5,100,000 acre-feet (6.3 km^{3}) are used in California every year as cattle feed.
- Megafarmers: a single megafarming couple uses more water than all the households in Los Angeles
- Also, from 2008–2015, over 2,400,000 acre-feet (3.0 km^{3}) (300,000 acre-feet (0.37 km^{3}) per year) were released into the San Francisco Bay to save the endangered Delta smelt. An alternative, salinity barriers, is being installed.

=== Flow Augmentation ===
Meeting EPA water quality standards currently requires allowing billions of gallons per day to flow into the ocean.

On March 20, 2023, Trinity Lake was losing 1 billion gallons per day to Flow Augmentation. This happened during historic drought, while Trinity was at only 50% of historical average, and all other major California lakes were at least 91% of historical average. The Trinity River Restoration Program is responsible for regulating the flow.

=== Supply and demand ===
Water in California can be expensive. This leads to awareness of water management challenges.

In some instances, water tables underground have dropped from 100 to 400–600 feet deep, basically shutting off most private well owners from their own water sources.

==== Treating water as a commodity ====
Water is managed by government consent, which assumes ownership and management of all free flowing rivers, lakes, and bodies of water in its jurisdictions. In many cases in the US, water has been used for commercial purposes, such as Nestle's 72 brands of bottled water. It is managed by governmental authorities selling its water rights. Some local and state governments have resorted to selling water rights for income even when it harms the local community and environment (e.g. taking water away from California and bottling and shipping it to water-rich parts of the United States and the world for profit). This has led many to criticize treating water as a commodity.

Despite Nestle's claims of acting according to the law, however, in 2017 California authorities found that the company extracted 58 million gallons, far surpassing the 2.3 million gallons per year it had rights to claim. Lately, locals have been fighting back against the "stealing" of precious resources by opposing and not allowing huge water draw down facilities to be set up. For example, officials at California's State Water Resources Control Board have made moves to prevent Nestlé from draining millions of gallons of water from the San Bernardino National Forest. Nestle's continued bottling in the forest after its permit to do so was expired by decades. In doing so, Nestle depleted Strawberry Creek.

Another bottled water company, Crystal Geyser, was found to be illegally transporting and dumping arsenic-laded wastewater from its bottling facilities.

==== Water independence ====
Orange County is working toward water independence by building the world's largest indirect potable water recycling project – the Groundwater Replenishment System. Poseidon Water is also developing a seawater desalination plant in Huntington Beach for Orange County and has already built and is operating a seawater desalination plant in Carlsbad for San Diego County. Combined the two plants will provide 100 million gallons of drinking water per day, or enough water for about 800,000 people.

== See also ==
- Global climate disruption
- Land surface effects on climate
- Water reuse in California
