= UNESCO Working Group on Land Subsidence =

"Land Subsidence" was included in the UNESCO programme of the International Hydrological Decade (IHD), 1965–1974 and an ad hoc working group on land subsidence was formed. In 1975 subsidence was maintained under the framework of the UNESCO IHP (subproject 8.4: "Investigation of Land Subsidence due to Groundwater Exploitation") and UNESCO IHP formerly codified the Working Group on Land Subsidence (WGLS). From 2018 the Working Group has become a UNESCO initiative changing its name to UNESCO Land Subsidence International Initiative (LASII). The missions of the WGLS are:

- Improve scientific and technical knowledge needed to identify and characterize threats related to natural and anthropogenic land subsidence.
- Stimulate and enable international exchange of information to sustenance sustainable groundwater resources development in areas susceptible to land subsidence through:
1. design, implementation of mitigation actions as well as risk assessment.
2. proposal for new effective resource-management policies.

== Composition of the UNESCO Working Group on Land Subsidence ==
The Intergovernmental Council for the International Hydrological Programme (IHP) created a Working Group on Land Subsidence for liaison of IHP subproject 8.4, "Investigation on land subsidence due to ground-water exploitation." in April 1975. This first WGLS was composed by:

- Mr. Joseph F. Poland, Chairman. U.S. Geological Survey, USA. (Chair)
- Mr. Germán Figueroa Vega. Comisión de Aguas de Valle de México, México.
- Ms. Laura Carbognin. National Research Council, Italy
- Mr. Ivan Johnson. Representative of IAHS, USA.
- Mr. Soki Yamamoto. Rissho University, Japan.

Currently, the WGLS comprises 20 subsidence experts from 12 countries (i.e. USA, Mexico, The Netherlands, Poland, Spain, Italy, Egypt, China, Japan, Thailand, Taiwan and Pakistan) and a UNESCO–IHP representative. Of the 18 subsidence experts, 16 are members and 4 are observers.

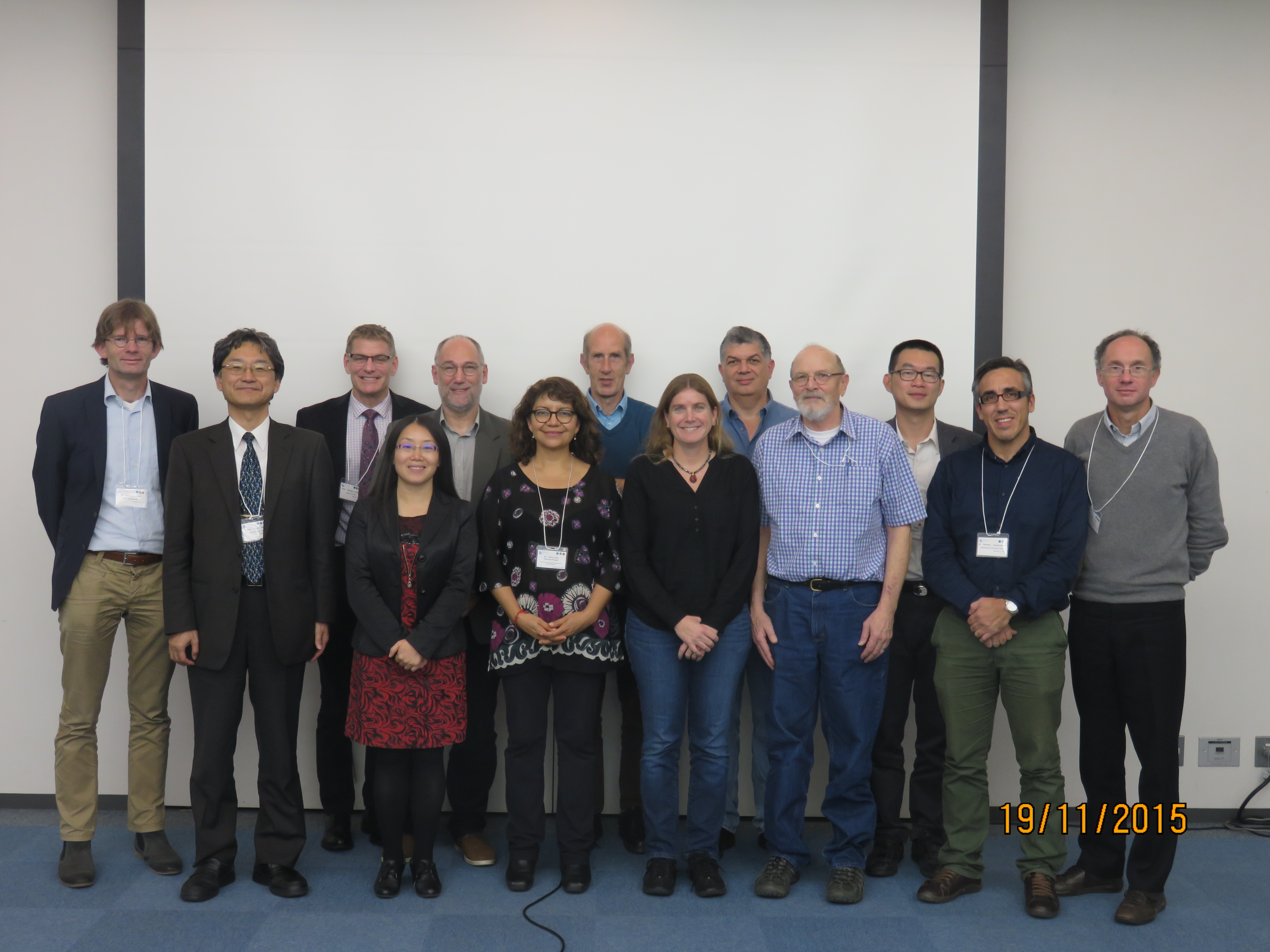
Annual Meeting WGLS 2015

== Activities of the UNESCO Working Group on Land Subsidence ==
Past, current and planned activities of the UNESCO–IHP WGLS are primarily focused on its mission to enhance scientific/technical knowledge exchange and promote/facilitate international exchange of information regarding natural and anthropogenic subsidence processes and the sustainable development of our natural resources in areas susceptible to subsidence. Some of the fairly recent past and current activities, beyond the regular efforts to convene the international subsidence symposia, consist on other networking, publishing, research and programmatic endeavors. Jointly with UNESCO IHP, IAHS as well as other scientific organizations, the UNESCO WGLS has organized nine International Symposia on Land Subsidence in different countries from Asia, Europe and North America.

- Tokyo, Japan (1969)
- Anaheim, USA (1977)
- Venice, Italy (1986)
- Houston, USA (1991)
- The Hague, Netherlands (1995)
- Ravenna, Italy (2000)
- Shanghai, China (2005)
- Querétaro, México (2010)
- Nagoya, Japan (2015)

The proceedings of the nine published symposia jointly with two companion books contain relevant references of land subsidence research and case studies that cover anthropogenic and natural land subsidence processes worldwide.

== See also ==
- Subsidence
- Groundwater-related subsidence
