= Sinking cities =

Cities endangered by environmental change

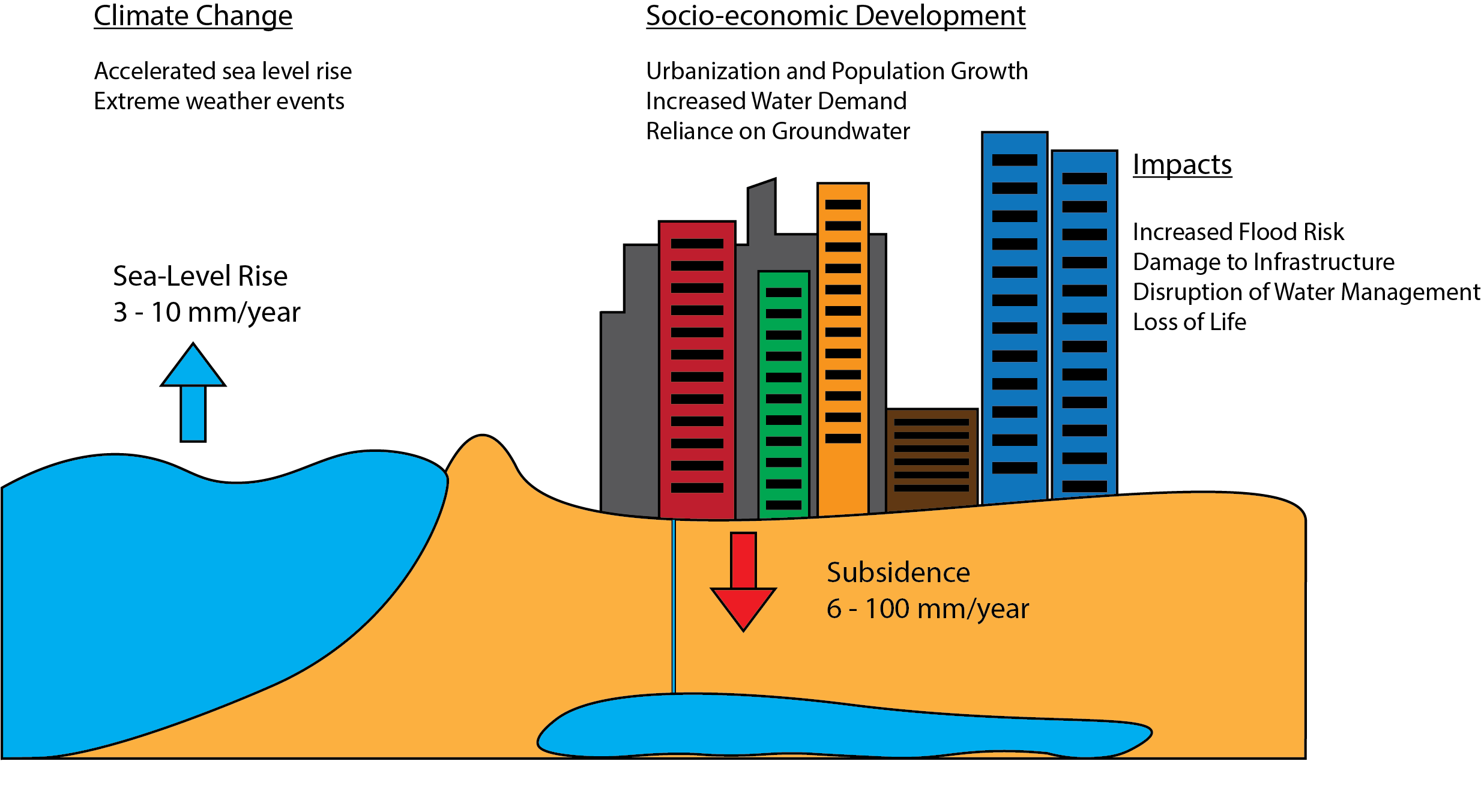
Drivers, processes, and impacts of sinking cities

Sinking cities are urban environments that are in danger of disappearing due to their rapidly changing landscapes. The largest contributors to these cities becoming unlivable are the combined effects of climate change (manifested through sea level rise, intensifying storms, and storm surge), land subsidence, and accelerated urbanization. Many of the world's largest and most rapidly growing cities are located along rivers and coasts, exposing them to natural disasters. Metropolitan areas were built on flat flood plains due to their suitability for agriculture, urban development, and international trade; however, these flood plains are often geologically young (only several thousand years old), and human activities such as groundwater extraction and urban development can trigger rapid subsidence, creating compound risks alongside sea level rise. As countries continue to invest people, assets, and infrastructure into these cities, the loss potential in these areas also increases. Sinking cities must overcome substantial barriers to properly prepare for today's dynamic environmental climate.

== Background and history ==
=== Development ===
The vast majority of sinking cities are located in coastal lowlands. These areas are particularly vulnerable to climate related hazards, but since ancient times, have also been preferred areas for human settlement. Soil fertility, availability of fresh water from rivers, and accessibility due to flat topographical relief have long made coastal plains valuable agricultural resources. In addition, their proximity to waterways allowed for the development of port cities, which became hot spots of trade and economic activity.

Port cities played a central role in the expansion of regional and global economies, particularly from the early modern period through the industrial era. Cities, such as New York City, grew rapidly due to their strategic locations surrounded by water. New York City, and its easy access the Hudson River and along Atlantic trade routes, quickly became a gateway for international commerce, migration, and development.

As a major port city, New York City experienced exponential population growth and industrial development throughout the 19th and 20th centuries. However, large portions of the city were built on reclaimed land and filled wetlands, which makes it more susceptible to instability and subsidence over time. Over time, we are already seeing the effects of this from gradual land subsidence.

== Causes ==
The growing physical risks to many coastal cities stem from a combination of factors relating to rapid urbanization, climate change, and land subsidence. Many of these natural hazards are largely anthropogenic in origin. In many cases, the fundamental aspects that lead to sinking cities become tightly interwoven, and over time, are increasingly difficult to resolve.

=== Urbanization ===
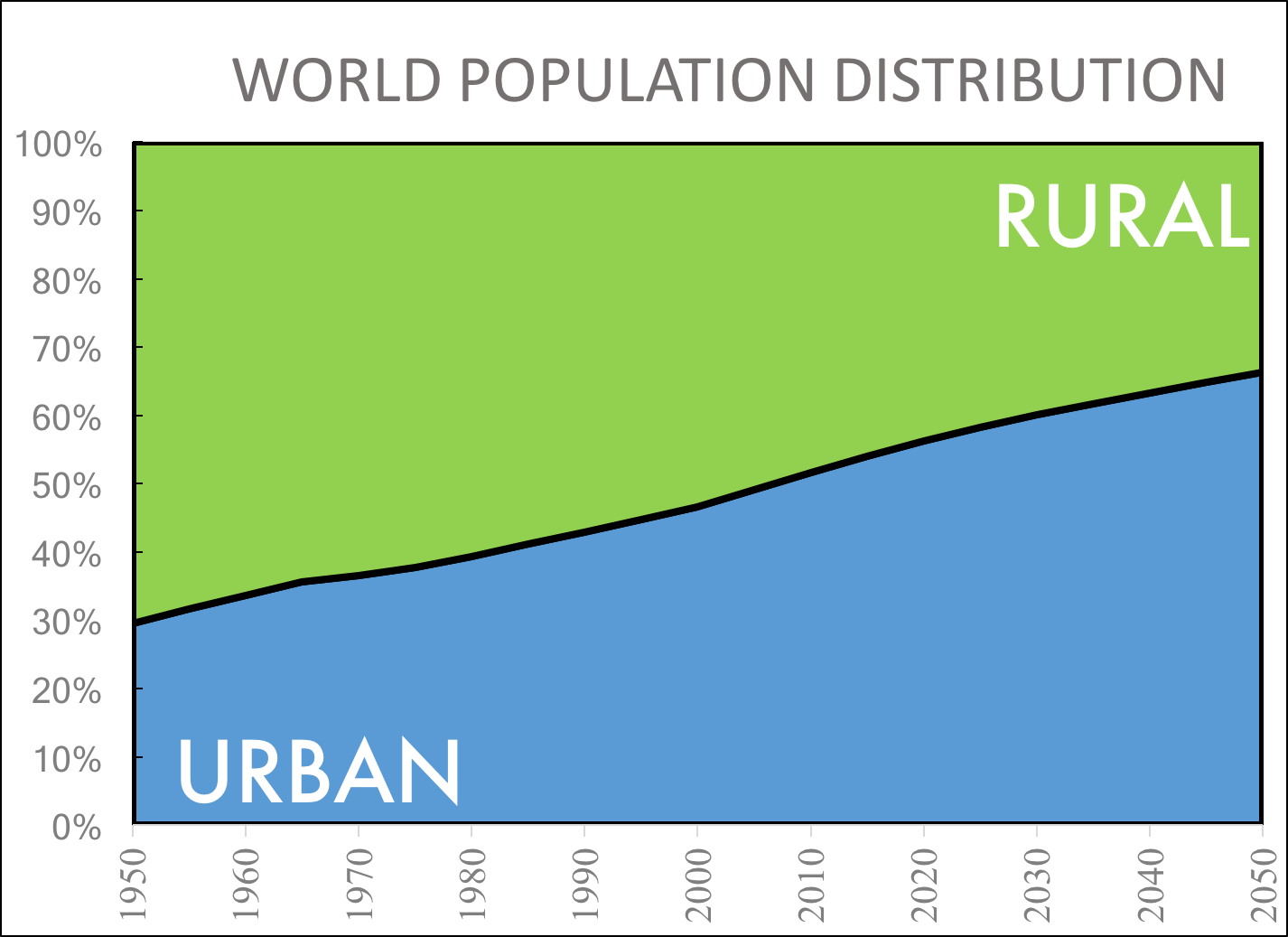
Global Population Urban vs. Rural

For the first time in human history the majority of people live in urban areas. The United Nations estimates that approximately 68% of the world's population will be living in urban areas by 2050. Urbanization has vast implications including the urban planning, geography, sociology, architecture, economics, and public health of a region. The rate at which urbanization occurs is also important. Slower rates of urbanization allow city planners time to make thoughtful planning decisions. Once cities reach maturity, it can take decades for local governments to develop, fund, and execute major infrastructure projects to alleviate the issues brought on by rapid urbanization.

=== Land subsidence ===
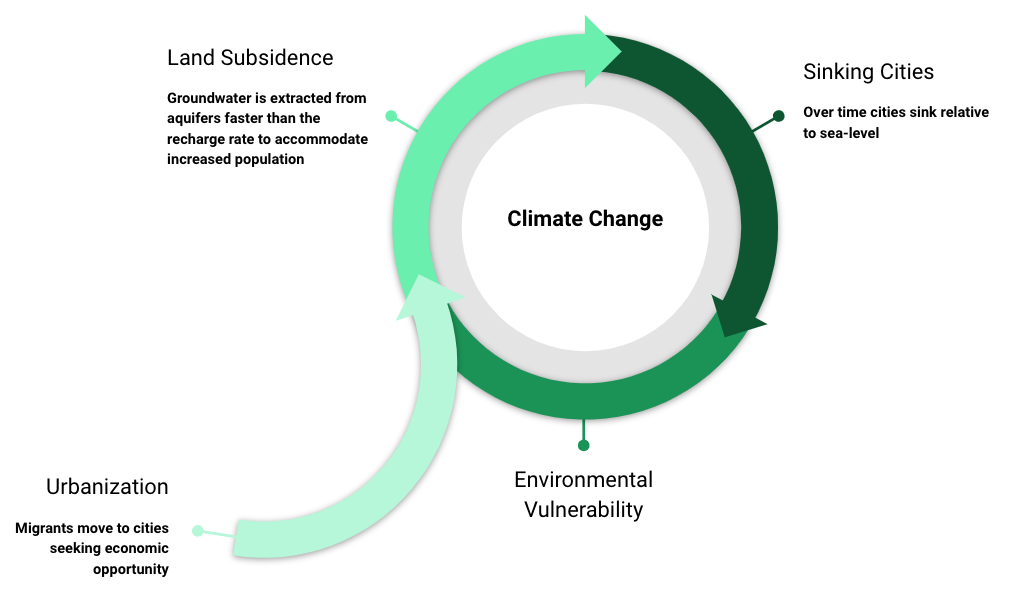
Interconnected Aspects of Sinking Cities

Subsidence is the sudden sinking or gradual downward settling of the ground's surface with little or no horizontal motion. Land subsidence can have both direct and indirect repercussions for cities. Direct impacts are often in the form of structural damage to major infrastructure systems, including water management networks, buildings, and highways. Land subsidence also further adds to the growing risk of coastal flooding, and oftentimes, the net rate of subsidence exceeds that of sea level rise. In Bangkok, the Gulf of Thailand is rising 0.25 cm per year, but the city is sinking at a far faster rate, up to 4 cm per year. This downward settlement significantly increases flood vulnerability which can ultimately lead to major economic damages and loss of lives.

==== Causes ====
Water is a vital resource that people need to survive. However, with the increase of the human population, more water is being extracted from underground aquifers which creates large subsidence problems. Due to the dense populations along river deltas, industrial development, and relaxed or no environmental protections, river waters often became polluted. This has become an ever more common phenomena in coastal mega-cities, particularly in Asia. Many cities are unable to afford costly water treatment systems and are forced to rely heavily on groundwater. In the aquifers, there are rock and sediments of different sizes, creating different pores of varying sizes which capture water underground. As the ground is loaded, most often through increased development, the soil compresses and land begins to subside. Depending on the geology of the region, subsidence may occur rapidly, as in many coastal plains, or more slowly depending on bedrock depth. Furthermore, oil, natural gas, and other hydrocarbons, can be found in rock pores underground. These natural resources, however, can also cause land subsidence when extracted.

High buildings can create land subsidence by pressing the soil beneath with their weight. The problem is already felt in New York City, San Francisco Bay Area, Lagos.

==== Examples ====
Venice is often referenced as an example of a city suffering from subsidence, however, it is a relatively minor case with mostly historical origins. More serious are the Asian metropolises with concentrations of millions of people living at or even below mean sea level. Some cities, such as Tokyo, have developed sophisticated techniques for measuring, monitoring, and combating land subsidence. But many other large cities (Hanoi, Haiphong, Yangon, Manila, etc.), particularly in developing nations, have no record of their subsidence, which is far from under control. Many cities do not possess the resources necessary to conduct complex, and often expensive, geological, geotechnical, and hydrogeological studies required to accurately measure and model future land subsidence.

Subsidence in Coastal Cities
City	Mean cumulative subsidence in period 1900-2013 (mm)	Mean current subsidence rate (mm/year)	Maximum subsidence rate (mm/year)	Estimated additional mean cumulative subsidence until 2025 (mm)
Jakarta (Indonesia)	2,000	75 - 100	179	1,800
Ho Chi Minh City (Vietnam)	300	up to 80	80	200
Bangkok (Thailand)	1,250	20 - 30	120	190
New Orleans (United States)	1,130	6	26	> 200
Tokyo (Japan)	4,250	≈ 0	239	0

Mexico City is an example of a sinking city that is neither coastal nor low-lying. The city was originally constructed by the Aztecs above a large aquifer in the 1300s. Subsidence was originally caused by the loading of large Aztec and Spanish structures. The city grew rapidly during the nineteenth century, and with it, so did the demand for water. By 1854 more than 140 wells had been drilled into the aquifer beneath Mexico City. Although the early cultures drew water from the same lakes and aquifers, they were merely 300,000 people as compared to the city's current population of 21 million. Today, the historic and densely populated city is rapidly sinking at varying rates between 15 – 46 cm/year. The city is also currently plagued with water shortage issues emphasizing a common positive feedback loop that exists within sinking cities.

=== Contributing factors ===
==== Climate change ====
Low-lying cities are especially prone to the most devastating effects of climate change. The risks posed by climate change will continue to grow into the next century, even if a dramatic reduction in greenhouse gas (GHG) emissions is achieved, due to the built-in momentum from previous emissions. Moreover, recent reports by the United Nations have shown that climate change may be accelerating rather than slowing down. The 2019 Emissions Gap Report confirmed that GHG emissions continue to rise, despite highly publicized political commitments. The report goes on to emphasize that countries must increase their Intended Nationally Determined Contributions threefold to remain below the 2 °C goal and more than fivefold to achieve the 1.5 °C goal.

Coastal cities will bear the largest impacts of climate change due to their proximity to the sea. Storm surges and high tides could combine with sea level rise and land subsidence to further increase flooding in many regions. Oftentimes even recently completed infrastructure projects have not properly accounted for the rapidly changing climate. Asia's coastal megacities are particularly at risk as certain cities' flood protection measures have been cited as inadequate even for 30-year flood events.

===== Sea level rise =====
Although reports vary widely in predicting the height of sea level rise in the future, IPCC estimates predict a 1-meter rise over the next century. Other reports consider the IPCC estimates to be far too low and suggest levels closer to 1.9 meters by 2100. As sea levels continue to rise, coastal cities face challenges of properly modeling and preparing for the increased storm surges brought on by tropical storms.

===== Intensifying storms =====
Risks due to sea level rise will only be compounded by intensifying storms. As the oceans continue to warm, tropical cyclone rainfall rates and cyclone intensities are likely to increase. Studies conducted by the NOAA also suggest a 2 °C increase in global temperatures will lead to a greater proportion of tropical storms that reach Category 4 and Category 5 levels. Hurricane Sandy (2012), which was only a Category 3 storm, inflicted nearly US$70 billion in damages. Additionally, climate change may cause a change in the paths of tropical cyclones, bringing storms to places which have previously not had to contend with major hurricanes. These vulnerable areas are likely to be unaware and ill-prepared for the ever intensifying storms.

== Impacts ==
=== Economic ===
As cities continue to grow, fueled by global urbanization, countries will continue to invest additional resources to accommodate the growing populations. Every day, sinking cities are becoming increasingly vulnerable to natural disasters, many of which are critical components of their national economies, and some, of the global economy. Hurricane Sandy, alone, caused $19 billion in damages and economic losses.

The impacts of Hurricane Sandy showed a preview of what the risks of rising sea levels can look like. When the storm struck in 2012, it caused flooding throughout New York, shutting down subways, displacing people, and widespread power outages. Not only were local neighborhoods impacted, national economies were also impacted as New York City's key financial districts, like the New York Stock Exchange, were closed due to flooding. Beyond the immediate economic losses, the storm exposed the city’s underlying vulnerability to both rising sea levels and gradual land subsidence, which together increase the likelihood and severity of future flooding.

In a study conducted by Zillow, the real estate firm found that a combined $882 billion worth of real estate would be underwater if sea level were to rise by six feet. Furthermore, the estimate only accounts for sea level rise and doesn't consider the possibility of major storms or land subsidence. New York City alone accounts for approximately 8% of the United States GDP and has experienced costly storms within the past decade.

=== Social and ethical ===
With sea levels expecting to increase another 5.4 feet by 2100 in New York City, the most profound consequences may be social and ethical, as rising waters threaten low-income and marginalized communities.

Asian urbanization will be accompanied by a significant increase in the number of urban poor as migrants continue to move to cities in hopes of economic prosperity. One report by OECD examined the vulnerability of 130 major port cities to climate change and found that by 2070 approximately half of the total population threatened by coastal flooding would reside in just ten megacities, all but one located in Asia. Another report analyzed the 616 largest metropolitan areas home to 1.7 billion people and cover approximately US$34,000 billion of global GDP. The study found that flood risk threatens more people than any other natural catastrophe.

The urban poor will bear a disproportionate burden of climate change risk as they are likely to settle in areas most prone to flooding. This has also been seen in many US cities as low income housing is typically situated in the flood zones. Hurricane Katrina, in New Orleans, disproportionately impacted low income and minority communities as the wealthiest communities are situated above sea level, and thus, further protected from major storms.

In other countries, environmental refugees have become a particularly difficult problem for governments. In Bangladesh, rising sea levels and resulting floods have caused many people to flee to cities in India. In the coming decades, as impending storms begin to damage large sinking cities, environmental refugees are likely to become a global phenomenon.

Megaprojects, like The BIG U (NYC), have been proposed to help protect against future super storms and long-term sea level rise. However, major questions are being raised regarding the project's effectiveness and social responsibility.

=== Political ===
Sinking cities have even led some nations to make drastic political changes. Jakarta, the capital of Indonesia, is home to 10 million people and is one of the fastest sinking cities in the world. Almost half the city sits below sea level, and some researchers believe if the subsidence issues continue to go unchecked parts of the city will be entirely submerged by 2050. Jakarta's environmental issues have become so dire that the Indonesian government has proposed the capital be moved from Jakarta to a new city in Kalimantan in Borneo. The move hopes to ease some of the inequality and growing population issues in Jakarta by relocating a large portion of the population to the new capital. The controversial move is not unprecedented, but is likely one of the first capital relocations to be driven by environmental forces.

In New York City, many leaders such as Michael Bloomberg, Bill de Blasio, Eric Adams, and Andrew Cuomo have spoken out about the growing risks of sea-level rise and climate change, emphasizing the need for infrastructure investment, climate resilience, and more equitable protection for vulnerable communities.

== Policy development ==
In many cases, urban officials have been unable to manage the challenges associated with sinking cities. Although every city has specific issues, the following are common general barriers to urban adaptation:

- Urban officials' lack of awareness regarding the magnitude and vulnerability of coastal flooding risk
- The need to cope with immediate problems such as housing, transportation, and poverty
- Financial constraints which limit infrastructure upgrades
- Governance issues

=== Mitigation ===
The first step in mitigating the risks associated with sinking cities is raising awareness among citizens and city officials. Some of the vulnerabilities of sinking cities are unable to be controlled by engineering projects like climate change, so it is essential that urban officials are aware of the risks and vulnerabilities posed on their region. This starts by conducting local and regional assessments that analyze city-level flood risks and culminates in creating a long term resiliency plan for cities. At this stage, climate change can no longer be mitigated. International goals hope to reduce its impact throughout the twenty-first century, however, cities must design with climate adaptability in mind.

==== Land subsidence ====
Other components of sinking cities are within the control of urban officials and can be successfully mitigated. The first step toward a successful subsidence mitigation strategy is measuring and understanding its root causes. Many different techniques are used today including optical leveling, GPS surveys, LIDAR, and InSAR satellite imagery. Ideally, a combination of techniques will be used to conduct the initial studies. Many cities have successfully implemented policies to reduce subsidence. In Tokyo, groundwater regulations were implemented in the early 1960s, and ten years later, subsidence came to a halt. Shanghai is another example of a city that successfully implemented a subsidence mitigation strategy. Shanghai implemented an active recharge technique which actively pumps an equal amount of water back into the subsurface as water is extracted. Assuming the pumping rates are in balance with the recharge rates, this has been proven to be a successful strategy.

=== Adaptation ===
For many sinking cities, adaptation is a more realistic strategy as many of the feedback loops associated with urbanization are too strong to overcome. For most sinking cities, the largest challenge associated with adaptation often becomes cost. The cost of adaptation to climate change required by developing countries, mostly in Asia, is estimated by the World Bank at US$75–100 billion per annum. However, the United Nations adaptation fund remains pitifully under-resourced at US$18 million. For many countries, foreign assistance will be necessary to fund large adaptation projects.

A major component of adapting to climate change is the installation of flood protections, warning systems/evacuation planning, and land use and spatial planning. Construction of large seawalls, dikes, and diversion channels, are underway in many cities, but these solutions often only limit damage and must be combined with warning systems and evacuation plans. Warning systems and evacuation plans are likely the only response in coping with large-scale disasters to avoid significant loss of life. However, as seen during Hurricane Katrina, evacuation is not easily executed, as residents are often unwilling to abandon their unprotected property.

== Largest potential sinking cities ==
Cities at risk of coastal flooding, ranked by exposed population in 2070
Coastal city	Exposed population estimate (millions)
(India) Kolkata	14.0
(India) Mumbai	11.4
(Bangladesh) Dhaka	11.1
(China) Guangzhou	10.3
(Vietnam) Ho Chi Minh City	9.2
(China) Shanghai	5.5
(Thailand) Bangkok	5.1
(Myanmar) Yangon	5.0
(United States) Miami	4.8
(Vietnam) Haiphong	4.7

== See also ==
- Central Valley land subsidence – Land sinking when groundwater is withdrawn too quickly
- List of lost lands – Islands or continents supposedly existing during prehistory, having since disappeared
