= Groundwater-related subsidence =

Sinking of land due to groundwater extraction

Groundwater-related subsidence is the subsidence (or the sinking) of land resulting from unsustainable groundwater extraction. It is a growing problem in the developing world as cities increase in population and water use, without adequate pumping regulation and enforcement. One estimate has 80% of serious U.S. land subsidence problems associated with the excessive extraction of groundwater.

Groundwater can be considered one of the last free resources, as anyone who can afford to drill can usually draw up merely according to their ability to pump (depending on local regulations). However, pumping-induced draw down causes a depression of the groundwater surface around the production well. This can ultimately affect a large region by making it more difficult and expensive to pump the deeper water. Thus, the extraction of groundwater becomes a tragedy of the commons, with resulting economic externalities.

== Mechanism ==
The cause of the long-term surface changes associated with this phenomenon are fairly well known. As shown in the USGS figure, aquifers are frequently associated with compressible layers of silt or clay.

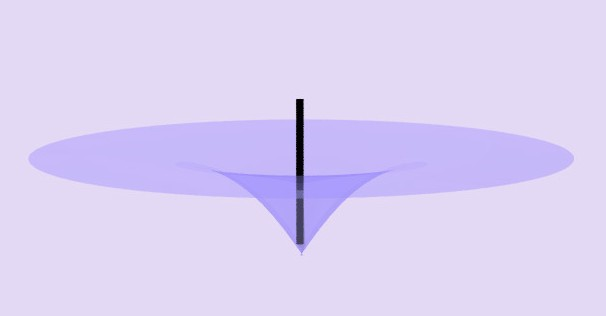
Groundwater surface drawdown

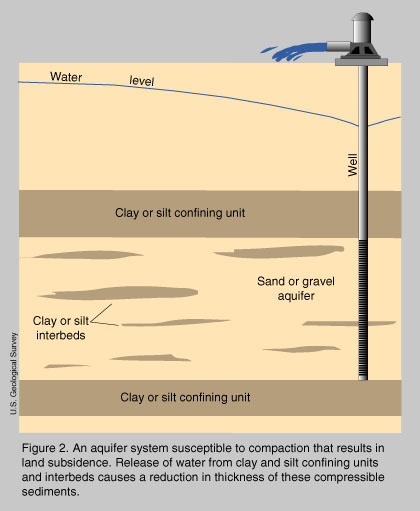

As the groundwater is pumped out, the effective stress changes, precipitating consolidation, which is often non-reversible. Thus, the total volume of the silts and clays is reduced, resulting in the lowering of the surface. The damage at the surface is much greater if there is differential settlement, or large-scale features, such as sinkholes and fissures.

Aquifer compaction is a significant concern along with pumping-induced land subsidence. A large portion of the groundwater storage potential of many aquifers can be significantly reduced when longterm groundwater extraction, and the resulting groundwater level decline, causes permanent compaction of fine sediment layers (silts and clays). A study in an arid agricultural region of Arizona showed that, even with a water level recovery of 100 ft after groundwater pumping was stopped, the land surface continued to subside for decades. This is a result of the continued dewatering of aquitards (fine-grain layers that slow the movement of groundwater) from stresses mentioned in the previous paragraph.

Total subsidence can usually be determined by ground-surface elevation surveys and GPS measurements. Potential impact on the aquifers and other resulting geohazards such as fissures can be assessed through long-term hydrologic studies and models.

The only known method to prevent this condition is by pumping less groundwater, which is extremely difficult to enforce when many people own water wells. Attempts are being made to directly recharge aquifers but this is still a preliminary effort.

== Impacted geographies ==
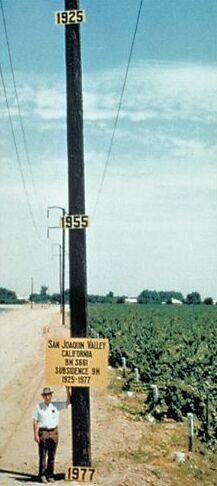
San Joaquin Valley surface change

The arid areas of the world are requiring more and more water for agriculture. However also non arid areas run into problems especially in fast growing suburban areas when more water is taken from aquifers than can be repleted. Groundwater-related subsidence often results in major damage to urban areas.

=== United States ===
In the San Joaquin Valley of the United States, groundwater pumping for crops has gone on for generations. This has resulted in the entire valley sinking an extraordinary amount, as shown in the figure. This has not come without consequences. Any large-scale change of topography, no matter how slight it may seem, has the potential to drastically change the surface-water hydrology. This has happened in the Joaquin Valley and other regions of the world, such as New Orleans . These areas are now subject to severe flooding due to subsidence associated with groundwater removal.

Some areas of the San Joaquin Valley have continued to sink in recent years as groundwater pumping intensifies during drought periods. This ongoing subsidence reflects the long‑term imbalance between groundwater extraction and natural recharge.

The entire East Coast has been sinking. Damage from Hurricane Katrina was exacerbated due to coastal sinking, associated with groundwater withdrawal. Major areas affected include the San Joaquin Valley in California, Central Arizona, Kansas which uses irrigation to grow corn and Arkansas which produces 50% of US rice. Between the 1950s and 1990s, Phoenix had a subsidence drop of 5.5 metres (18 ft).

=== Mexico ===
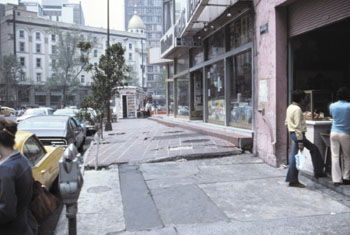
Mexico City subsidence

In Mexico City, the buildings interact with the settlement, and cause cracking, tilting, and other major damage. In many places, large sinkholes open up, as well as surface cavities.

=== Asia ===
Bangkok has had long standing problems. as well as Jakarta, Indonesia.

== See also ==
- Artesian aquifer – Naturally-pressurized water source
- Central Valley land subsidence – Land sinking when groundwater is withdrawn too quickly
- UNESCO Working Group on Land Subsidence
- Sea level rise
- List of aquifers in the United States
