= Leaky Acres Recharge Facility =

Coordinates: 36.793692°N 119.732481°W

The Leaky Acres Recharge Facility is a groundwater recharge facility located in Fresno, California. The facility began as a joint research project by the City of Fresno water division and the US Department of Agriculture. It first began percolating water in 1971 and was subsequently expanded and duplicated in other areas of the city.

== History ==
Following years of population growth and installing wells to meet domestic water demands, the city of Fresno saw falling groundwater levels at their wells. In 1960, the average-depth-to-water was 68 feet, while in 1978 it was 81 feet. These falling water levels under the urbanized area stood in contrast to the rising water levels around the wastewater treatment plant located outside the city to the southwest, which received and disposed of the bulk of the stormwater flow.

A research project was begun with the intent to artificially recharge the aquifer using stormwater and other surface water, sending it under the urbanized area and hopefully lift groundwater levels. Fresno water division superintendent Charles Gorham worked with local United States Department of Agriculture station leader William Bianchi to develop a 117-acre groundwater recharge basin in central Fresno which they called "Leaky Acres".

They located the basin at Chestnut and Dakota Avenues, next to the Fresno International Airport. The experiment first began percolating water in 1971 and saw 0.7 of water per acre per day sink into the soil over a 4-month period. They reported their findings in 1972 and converted operations from an experiment to a permanent facility. There were early concerns about mosquitoes and midges spawning in basins but some mitigation measures were put in place.

USDA station leader Bianchi wrote a technical report about the project which was selected as best paper of 1974 by the American Water Works Association. The association commended Bianchi for the successful project and for providing an example for other municipalities to solve groundwater recharge challenges.

An expansion adding approximately 70 acres to the facility was completed in 1979. Other agencies, such as the Fresno Irrigation District and the Fresno Municipal Flood Control District, built their own groundwater recharge facilities. The total construction and land costs for the expanded facility was $1,457,100.

== Design ==
Leaky Acres has 117 acres of ponding surface in 10 basins. The basins are designed to speed up the process of water soaking into the ground. Drainage tile was placed five feet underground forming a type of French drain system. The water from the drainage tile flows into a well shaft which allows it to bypass soil layers which are not very permeable and into the aquifer.

Water is delivered from the Kings River to the facility headworks by the Fresno Irrigation District via the Gould Canal.

The effectiveness of the groundwater recharge through the soil was studied from 1971 to 1980. Over that period, the average recharge rate was 10,848 acre feet per year at 86 percent facility efficiency. The 10-year mean actual recharge rate based on actual water delivered, total ponded area, and total days of recharge was 4.7 inches per day.
