= Water in California =

Water supply and distribution in the U.S. state of California

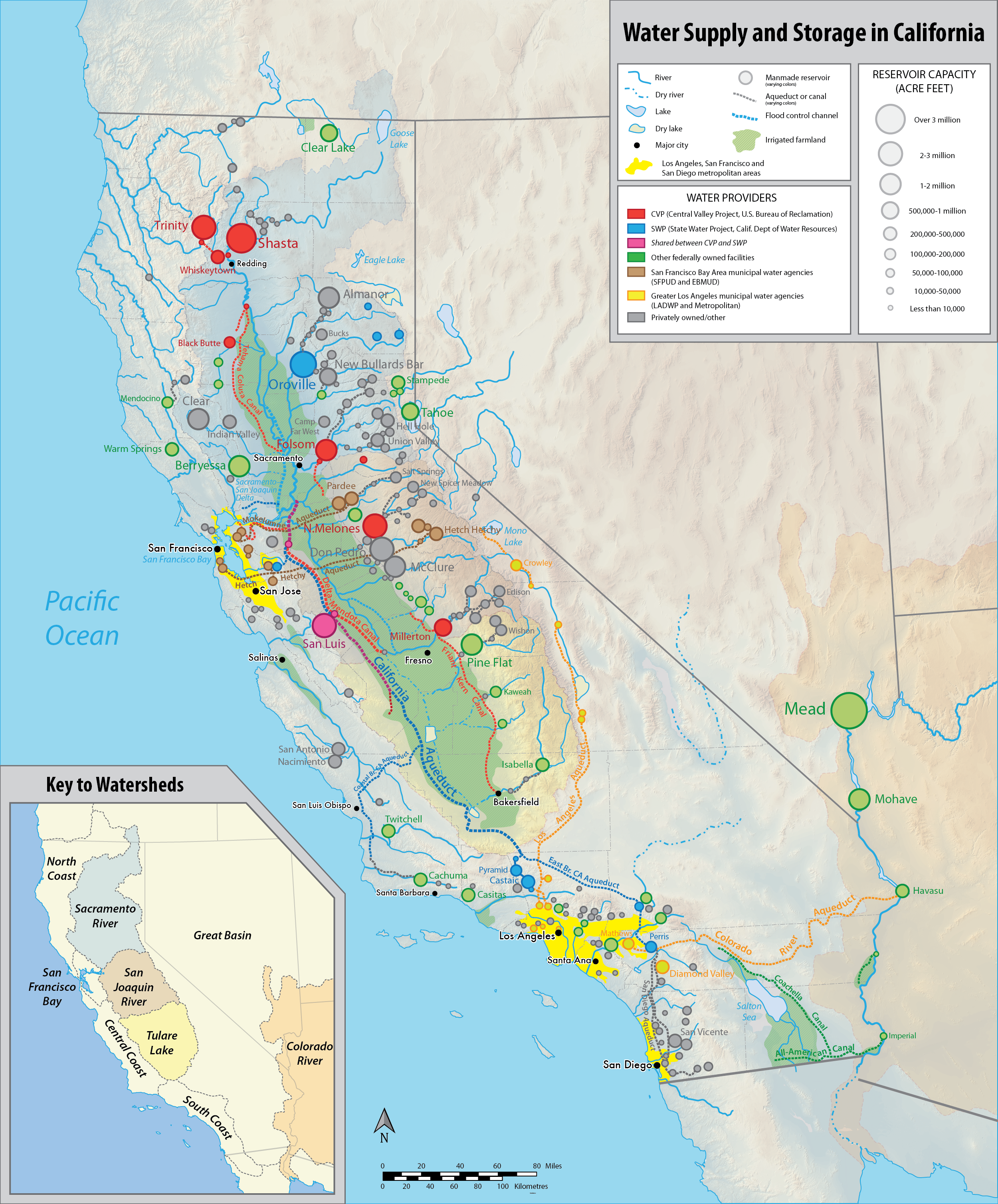
Map of water storage and delivery facilities as well as major rivers and cities in the state of California. Central Valley Project systems are in red, and State Water Project in blue.

California's interconnected water system serves almost 40 million people and irrigates over 5,680,000 acres (2,300,000 ha) of farmland. It has been described as the world's largest, most productive, and potentially most controversial water system, and it manages over 40 million acre-feet (49 km^{3}) of water per year. Use of available water averages 50% environmental, 40% agricultural and 10% urban, though this varies considerably by region and between wet and dry years. In wet years, "environmental" water averages 61%, while in dry years it averages 41%, and can be even lower in critically dry years.

Water and water rights are among the state's divisive political issues. Due to the lack of reliable dry season rainfall, water is limited in the most populous U.S. state. An ongoing debate is whether the state should increase the redistribution of water to its large agricultural and urban sectors, or increase conservation and preserve the natural ecosystems of the water sources.

== Sources of water ==
California's limited water supply comes from two main sources: surface water, or water that travels or gathers on the ground, like rivers, streams, and lakes; and groundwater, which is water that is pumped out from the ground. California has also begun producing a small amount of desalinated water, water that was once sea water, but has been purified.

=== Groundwater ===
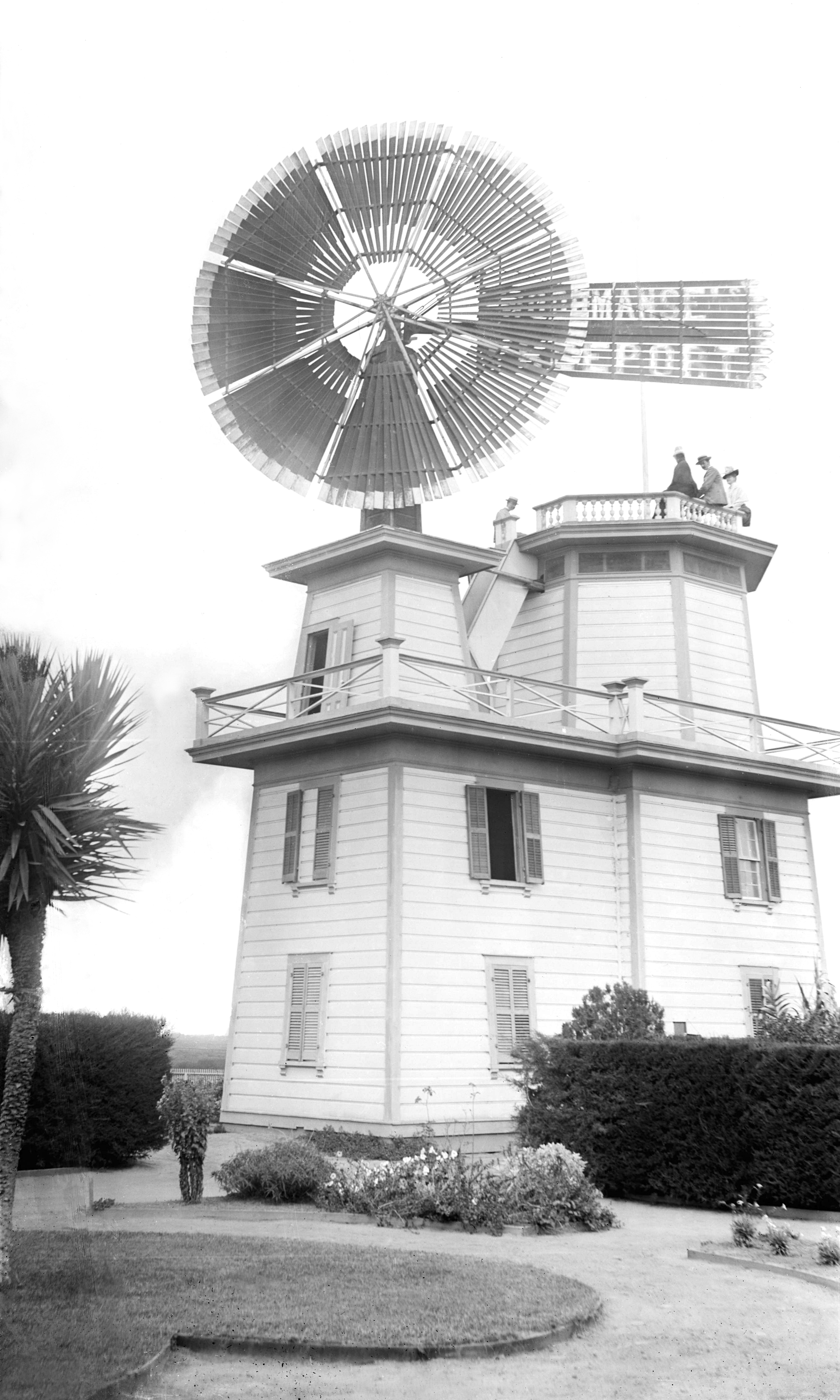
Windmill used to pump water for irrigation, Compton, ca. 1900–1901

Groundwater is a critical element of the California water supply. During a normal year, 30% of the state's water supply comes from groundwater (underground water). In times of intense drought, groundwater consumption can rise to 60% or more. Overdrafting of groundwater—pumping more than can naturally replenish—is a pressing concern, particularly in the Central Valley, where unsustainable extraction rates lead to both a severe decline in aquifer levels and land subsidence. Studies reveal that depletion rates in the Central Valley significantly exceed natural recharge, which endangers long-term water availability. Over 850,000,000 acre-feet (1,050 km^{3}) of water is stored in California's 450 known groundwater reservoirs. However, not all the water is usable. Over half of the groundwater is unavailable due to poor quality and the high cost of pumping the water from the ground. While surface water is concentrated mostly in the northern part of the state, groundwater is more evenly distributed.

The largest groundwater reservoirs are found in the Central Valley. The majority of the supply there is in the form of runoff that seeps into the aquifer. The freshwater is usually found in deposits of gravel, silt, and sand. Below these deposits lies a layer of deep sediment, a relic of the era when the Pacific Ocean covered the area. Efforts to counteract this include groundwater banking, recharge initiatives, and the Sustainable Groundwater Management Act (SGMA).

In 2014, the Sustainable Groundwater Management Act was introduced to regulate usage of groundwater sources statewide. This legislation regulates management of groundwater through local agencies in their own respective groundwater basin regions. Groundwater sustainability agencies are created by the legislation, and they are required to develop groundwater sustainability plans that control overdraft and recharge. California's groundwater is also overseen by the Groundwater Ambient Monitoring and Assessment Program, which evaluates groundwater quality and contamination across the state under the direction of the California State Water Resources Control Board.

The large quantity of water beneath the surface has given rise to the misconception that groundwater is a sort of renewable resource that can be limitlessly tapped. Calculations assuming that groundwater usage is sustainable if the rate of removal equals the rate of recharge are often incorrect as a result of ignoring changes in water consumption and water renewal.

While the volume of groundwater in California is very large, aquifers can be over drafted when groundwater is removed more rapidly than it is replenished. In 1999, it was estimated that the average, annual overdrafting was around 2,200,000 acre-feet (2.7 km^{3}) across the state, with 800,000 acre-feet (0.99 km^{3}) in the Central Valley. Since then, overdrafting had significantly increased. Satellite measurements found that in just the combined Sacramento and San Joaquin River basins, including the Central Valley, overdrafting between 2011 and 2014 was 12,000,000 acre-feet (15 km^{3}) of water per year.

=== Surface water ===
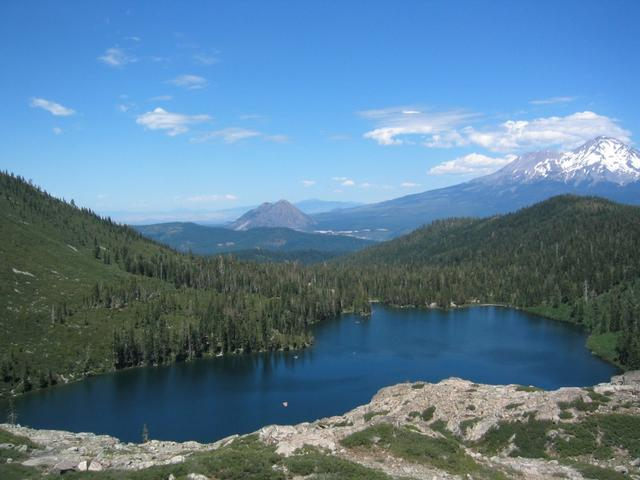
Castle Lake, part of the headwaters of the Sacramento River

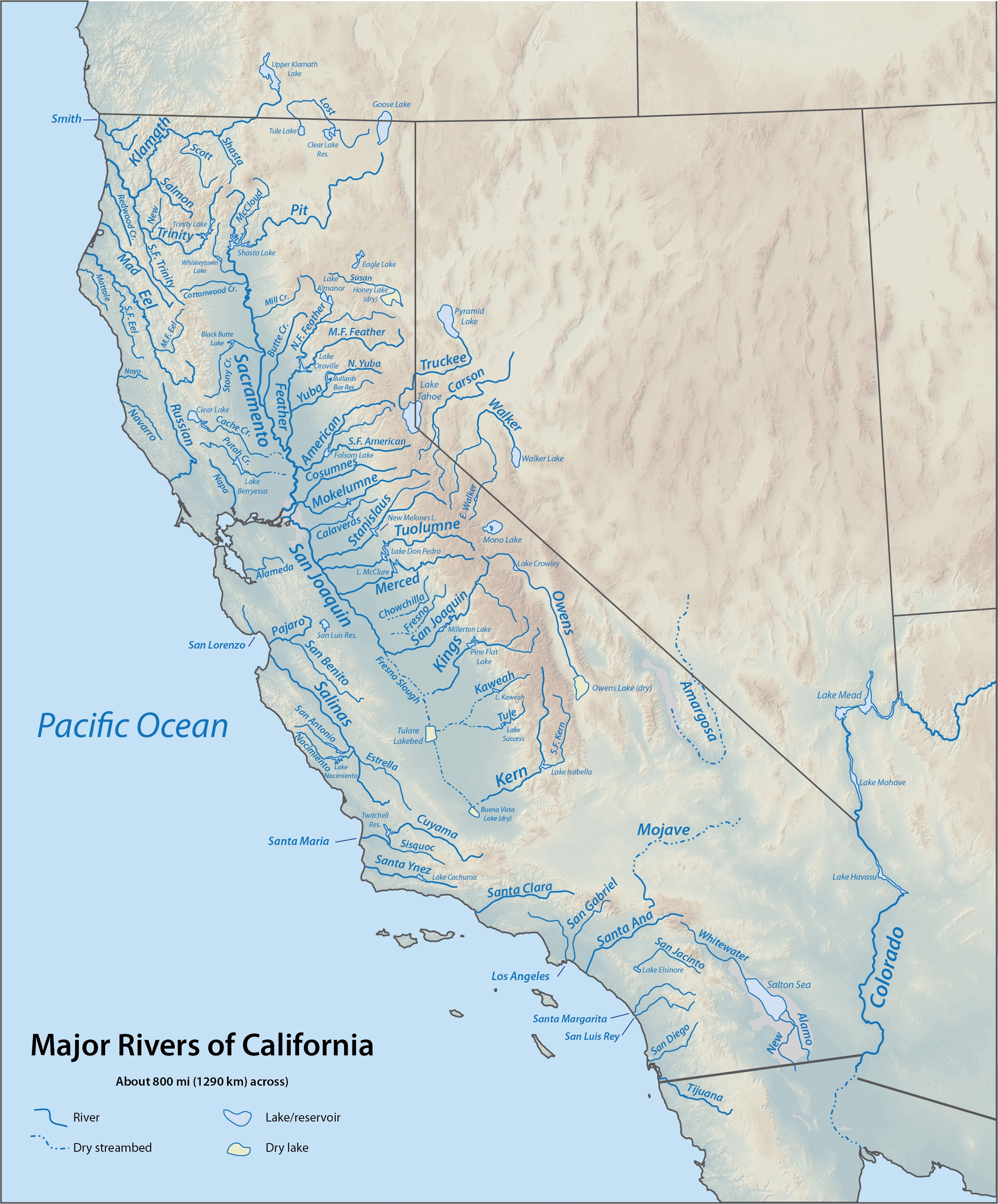
Major rivers of California

California has ten major drainage basins defined for convenience of water management. These basins are divided from one another by the crests of mountains. From north to south the basins are: North Coast, Sacramento River, North Lahontan, San Francisco Bay, San Joaquin River, Central Coast, Tulare Lake, South Lahontan, South Coast, and Colorado River regions. Each region incorporates watersheds from many rivers of similar clime. Many of the drainage basins are extremely altered, with hydroelectric power generation happening in much of the upper portion of these watersheds.

The Central Valley watershed, which incorporates the Sacramento River, San Joaquin River and Tulare Lake regions, is the largest in California, draining over a third of the state – 60,000 square miles (160,000 km^{2}) – and producing nearly half the total runoff. The Sierra Nevada snowpack feeds Central Valley river systems and is a critical source of water in the state's long dry season when little if any precipitation falls. Up to 30 percent of California's water supply is from snowpack, and the majority of California's hydroelectricity is also generated from the Sierra Nevada snowpack. More generally, in the US one of the largest uses of fresh water is withdrawals for the energy sector. Much of California's extensive reservoir and aqueduct system is designed to store and capture runoff from the Central Valley watershed. As this infrastructure ages, dam removal in California has become more widespread--a process that has been largely successful. The Sacramento and San Joaquin Rivers converge at the Sacramento–San Joaquin River Delta, a large fresh-water estuary where much of the state's water supply is withdrawn. The Central Valley watershed provides most of the water for Northern and Central California, as well as a significant chunk of Southern California's usage.

The North Coast watershed receives the highest annual precipitation of any California watershed. It incorporates many large river systems such as the Klamath, Smith, Trinity, and Eel, and produces over a third of the runoff in the state. With the notable exceptions of the Trinity Dam complex that transfers water from the Trinity River into the Sacramento River and Scott Dam that transfers water from the Eel River into the Russian River, most of the North Coast watersheds are relatively undeveloped, some have federal Wild and Scenic status that protect them from development; the northern coastal rivers provide water for salmonid habitat, carbon-sequestering forests, and local communities; some are within the influence of tribal water and fishing rights. Water flowing in these watersheds and into the Pacific Ocean is critical for sensitive, threatened, and endangered salmonids. There have been proposals to create additional inter-basin transfers from North Coast rivers to increase water supplies in the rest of California, but these projects have been rejected due to presumed environmental harm.

The Colorado River originates more than 1,000 miles (1,600 km) from California in the Rocky Mountains of Colorado and Wyoming and forms the state's southeastern border in the Mojave Desert. Unlike the other California watersheds, essentially all of the water flowing in the Colorado originates outside the state. The Colorado is a critical source of irrigation and urban water for southern California, providing between 55 and 65 percent of the total supply.

The Central and South Coast watersheds include the most populous regions of California – the San Francisco Bay Area, Los Angeles and San Diego – but have relatively little natural runoff, requiring the importation of water from other parts of the state.

Rivers of the Lahontan watersheds in eastern California are part of the high desert Great Basin and do not drain to the Pacific. Most of the water is used locally in eastern California and western Nevada for irrigation. The Owens River of the South Lahontan region, however, is a principal source of water for Los Angeles.

Main California watersheds
Hydrologic region	Annual precipitation	Annual runoff
North Coast	55,900,000 acre-feet (69.0 km^{3})	28,900,000 acre-feet (35.6 km^{3})
Sacramento River	52,400,000 acre-feet (64.6 km^{3})	22,400,000 acre-feet (27.6 km^{3})
North Lahontan	6,000,000 acre-feet (7.4 km^{3})	1,900,000 acre-feet (2.3 km^{3})
San Francisco Bay	5,500,000 acre-feet (6.8 km^{3})	1,200,000 acre-feet (1.5 km^{3})
San Joaquin River	21,800,000 acre-feet (26.9 km^{3})	7,900,000 acre-feet (9.7 km^{3})
Central Coast	12,300,000 acre-feet (15.2 km^{3})	2,500,000 acre-feet (3.1 km^{3})
Tulare Lake	13,900,000 acre-feet (17.1 km^{3})	3,300,000 acre-feet (4.1 km^{3})
South Lahontan	9,300,000 acre-feet (11.5 km^{3})	1,300,000 acre-feet (1.6 km^{3})
South Coast	10,800,000 acre-feet (13.3 km^{3})	1,200,000 acre-feet (1.5 km^{3})
Colorado River	4,300,000 acre-feet (5.3 km^{3})	200,000 acre-feet (0.25 km^{3})

=== Rain and snowfall ===
Rain typically falls in California only during the winter and spring months, from October through May, with more rain falling on the northern half of the state than the southern. Approximately 75 percent of the total precipitation volume occurs north of Sacramento, while 75 percent of the total water demand is in the south. With very rare exceptions, summers are dry throughout the state. Precipitation falling as snow in the Sierra and other mountain ranges feeds the network of reservoirs and surface water sources that supply the state; a low rainfall or light snowfall year can result in drought.

Rivers in northern and coastal California are mainly rain fed, peaking from January to April and falling to very low levels between June and November. Snowmelt has a significant influence on the Sierra Nevada rivers from east of Sacramento to east of Bakersfield, which typically peak between April and July. Snowmelt is also the primary water source for the Colorado River which supplies southern California.

Annual precipitation in California is highly variable, with a statewide average of 22.9 inches (58.2 cm) of precipitation per year. However, recorded precipitation totals can fluctuate heavily from year to year because of atmospheric conditions and climate change. El Niño–Southern Oscillation often has a significant effect on the state's precipitation, with generally higher precipitation during El Niño periods. In addition, climate change has impacted California's precipitation patterns in recent years with effects including more rapid snowmelt, more frequent heatwaves, and drier conditions across the state.

California precipitation and snowpack is measured by the state of California by "water year", which runs from October 1 to September 30.

=== Desalination ===
In response to water shortages in the state, some water districts are looking to desalination as a way to provide water for residents. Supporters view seawater desalination as a more reliable water source, since it draws its water from the ocean and thus, is not affected by periods of drought like other sources of water are. Another incentive for desalination is the ability for localities to be more self-sufficient with their water supply, thus improving their drought resilience. However, desalination has been the subject of scrutiny by opponents, who believe that the costs and possible environmental effects of desalination are indicators that California should continue to pursue other alternatives.

Although the response to desalination has been mixed, some areas of California are moving forward with seawater desalination. In December 2015, Poseidon Water completed the construction of the Claude "Bud" Lewis Carlsbad Desalination Plant. This facility, which was approved by the San Diego Water Authority, is responsible for providing water for about 8% of San Diego County's water by the year 2020. The facility cost $1 billion to build and is the largest desalination facility in the Western Hemisphere producing up to 50 million gallons (190,000 m^{3}) of water per day. As of December 2015, there are 6 additional seawater desalination plants currently in operation in the state of California. As of May 2016, there are also 9 more proposed desalination plants.

=== Reuse ===
Water reuse in California is increasingly important, with reclaimed water being used preferably for agricultural irrigation, toilet flushing, and industry (e.g., making concrete, cooling), although some apply direct and indirect potable reuse, risking environmental persistent pharmaceutical pollutants and other constituents of emerging concern. Treatment should be in accordance with the use and, in many cases, water can be safely and productively recycled back to the same non-potable use.

== Uses of water ==
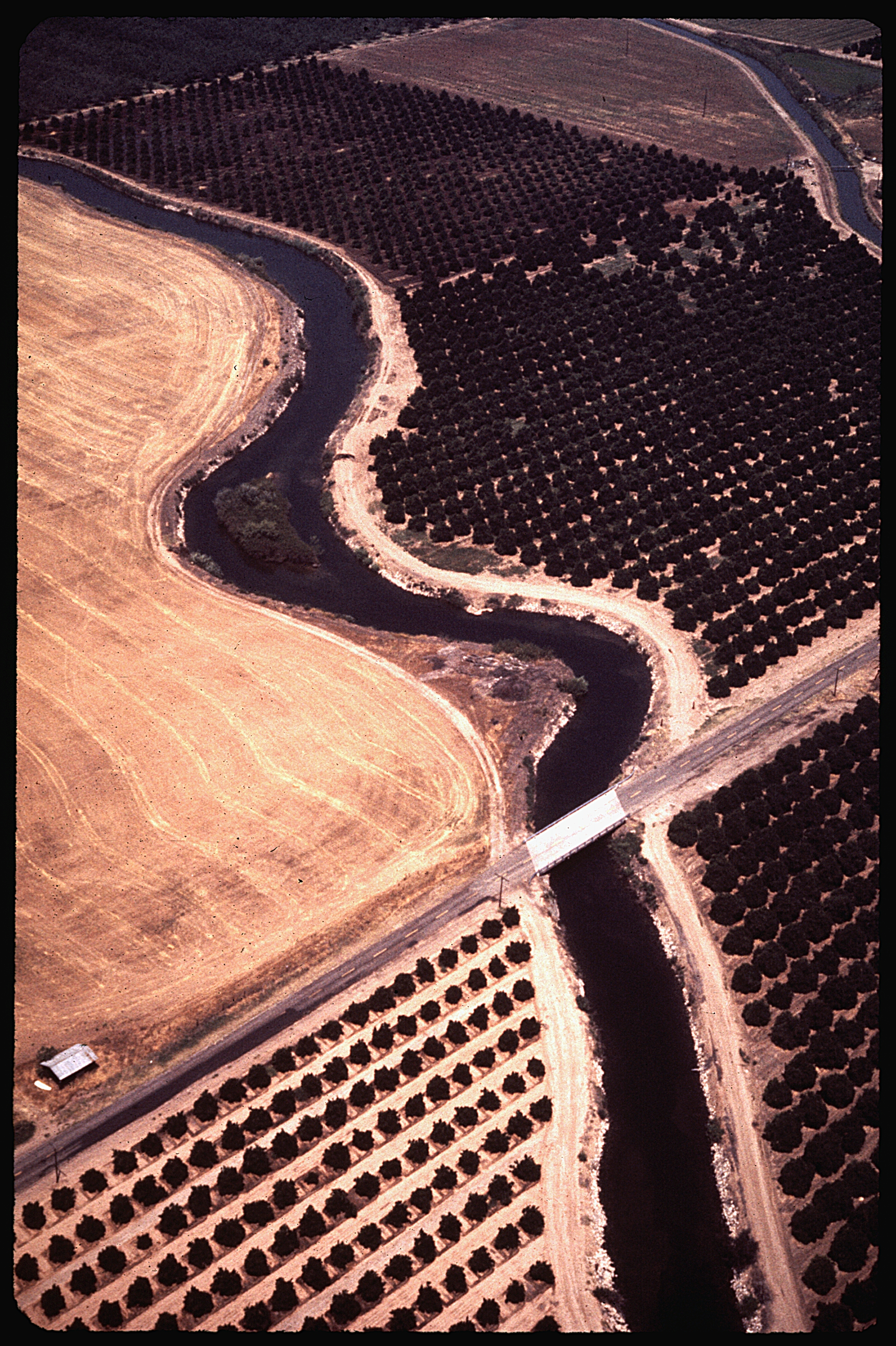
A canal irrigating citrus ranches in Fresno County, 1970s

Water use in California is divided into approximately 50% for environmental uses, 40% agricultural use and 10% urban uses, though that varies considerably between regions and between wet and dry years. About 63% of the water counted as "environmental" flows down Wild and Scenic Rivers in the North Coast where there is no practical way to recover it for either agricultural or urban use because it lacks many connections to the statewide water supply system. The water flow required to prevent salty water from the Pacific Ocean from intruding into the Delta is counted as "environmental water," though without that flow "reduced water quality resulting from large amounts of salt water drawn into the Delta could shut down the export pumps that supply fresh water to agriculture and cities."

Around 75% of California's water supply comes from north of Sacramento, while 80% of the water demand occurs in the southern two-thirds of the state. The Sacramento–San Joaquin River Delta receives about 40% of California's total precipitation and 50% of its total streamflow. The delta is used by the federal Central Valley Project (CVP) to supply water to the Central Valley and by the California State Water Project (SWP) to supply water to the San Francisco Bay Area, the Central Valley, and Southern California. In a typical year, about 10.8 million acre-feet (13.3 km^{3}) are exported from the delta: 67% by the CVP, 26% by the SWP, and the remaining 7% to other federal water project users. Those flows are greatly reduced in drought years. About 16.5 million acre-feet (20.4 km^{3}) of water entering the Delta in a typical year flows through the Delta into San Francisco Bay, including 6.3 million acre-feet (7.8 km^{3}) in governmentally mandated environmental flows; 22.4 million acre-feet (27.6 km^{3}) is used for other environmental purposes, and 1.6 million acre-feet (2.0 km^{3}) supplies water to managed wetlands and wildlife preserves.

=== Agricultural ===
In an average year, about 39% of California's water consumption, or 34.1 million acre-feet (42.1 km^{3}), is used for agricultural purposes. Of that total, 11%, or 8.9 million acre-feet (11.0 km^{3}) is not consumed by the farms for crop production but is instead recycled and reused by other water users, including environmental use, urban use, and agricultural use, yielding net water consumption for food and fiber production equal to 28% of California's water consumption, or 25.2 million acre-feet (31.1 km^{3}). This water irrigates almost 29 million acres (120,000 km^{2}), which grows 350 different crops. Agricultural water usage varies depending on the amount of rainfall each year.

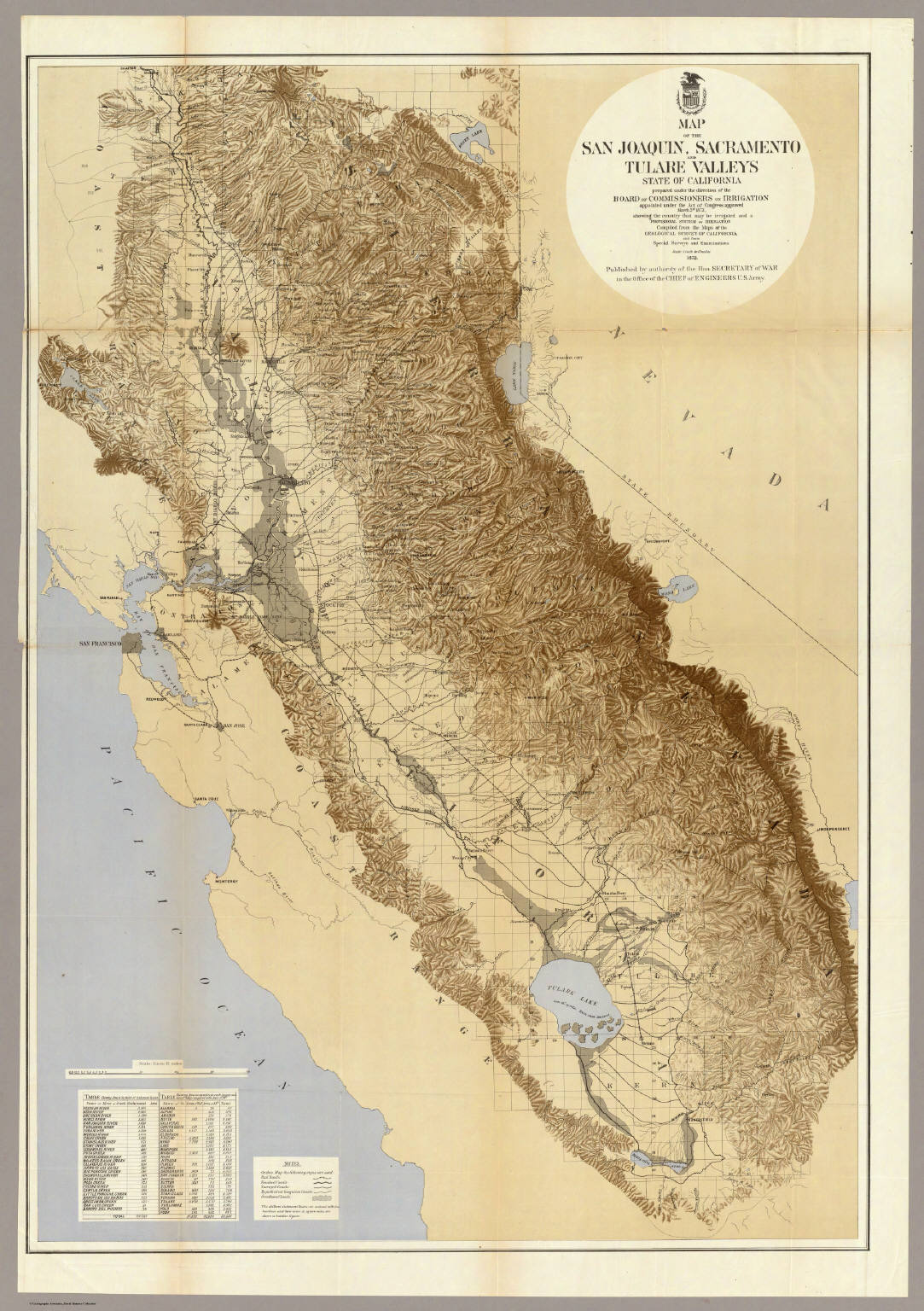
An 1873 map showing the Tulare Lake, which was the largest freshwater lake west of the Mississippi River

As of 2014, alfalfa uses about 18% of California irrigation water and produces 4% of California's farm-gate revenue, most of which is used as livestock feed. In 2015, California exported one-fourth of its total alfalfa production of roughly 2 million tons. About one-third of that, around 700,000 tons, went to China, Japan took about the same amount and Saudi Arabia bought 5,000 tons. Alfalfa farmers pay about $70 per acre-foot ($0.057/m^{3}), in Los Angeles that same amount of water is worth $1,000 per acre-foot ($0.81/m^{3}). In 2012, California exported 575,000 tons of alfalfa to China, for $586 million. Other common crop water use, if using all irrigated water: fruits and nuts with 34% of water use and 45% of revenue, field crops with 14% of water and 4% of revenue, pasture forage with 11% of water use and 1% of revenue, rice with 8% of water use and 2% of revenue (despite its lack of water, California grows nearly 5 billion pounds (2.3 million metric tons) of rice per year, and is the second largest rice-growing state), and truck farming of vegetables and nursery crops with 4% of water use and 42% of revenue; head of broccoli: 5.4 gallons; one walnut: 4.9 gallons; head of lettuce: 3.5 gallons; one tomato: 3.3 gallons; one almond 1.1 gallon; one pistachio: 0.75 gallon; one strawberry 0.4 gallon; one grape: 0.3 gallon.

Horses, based on the amount of alfalfa they eat, use about 1.9 million acre-feet (2.3 km^{3}) of water – about 7% of irrigated water in the state. There are 698,000 horses in California.

California is one of the top five states in water use for livestock. Water withdrawals for livestock use in California were 101 to 250 million US gallons (380,000 to 950,000 m^{3}) per day in 2010.

=== Urban/residential ===
Urban and industrial use of water consumes about 11%, or 8.9 million acre-feet (11.0 km^{3}), of total water consumption in an average year. A 2011 study of a sampling of 735 California homes across ten water districts found that the weighted average annual total water use of these homes was 132,000 US gallons (500 m^{3}) per year or 362 US gallons (1.37 m^{3}) per household per day. The study found that about 53% of total average household water use, or more than 192 US gallons (0.73 m^{3}) per household per day, was used for landscaping and other outdoor uses. Meanwhile, indoor use accounted for more than 170 US gallons (0.64 m^{3}) per household per day. The most in-home water consumption is toilet flushes, using 20% of the water. After toilets, 20% is used for showers and 18% goes to leaks inside homes.

In Sacramento, in 2012 before the severe drought started, residents were using 217 US gallons (0.82 m^{3}) a day per-capita. Many homes in Sacramento didn't have water meters until recently. They now are gradually being installed after former Gov. Arnold Schwarzenegger signed a 2004 law mandating meters statewide by 2025.

After Folsom, a city of 72,000 east of Sacramento, installed meters in 2011 and adopted tiered rates that charge more for people who consume the most water, per-capita use started falling steadily.

In response to the severe California drought, in April 2015, Governor Jerry Brown issued an executive order mandating statewide reductions in water use. The mandate aimed to reduce the amount of water consumed statewide in urban areas by 25% from 2013 levels. The State Water Resources Control Board (SWRCB) proposed regulatory instructions that grouped urban water utilities into nine tiers, with conservation standards ranging from 8% to 36%.

== Water distribution ==
There are six main systems of aqueducts and infrastructure that redistribute and transport water in California: the State Water Project, the Central Valley Project, several Colorado River delivery systems, the Los Angeles Aqueduct, the Tuolumne River/Hetch Hetchy system, and the Mokelumne Aqueduct.

=== The State Water Project ===
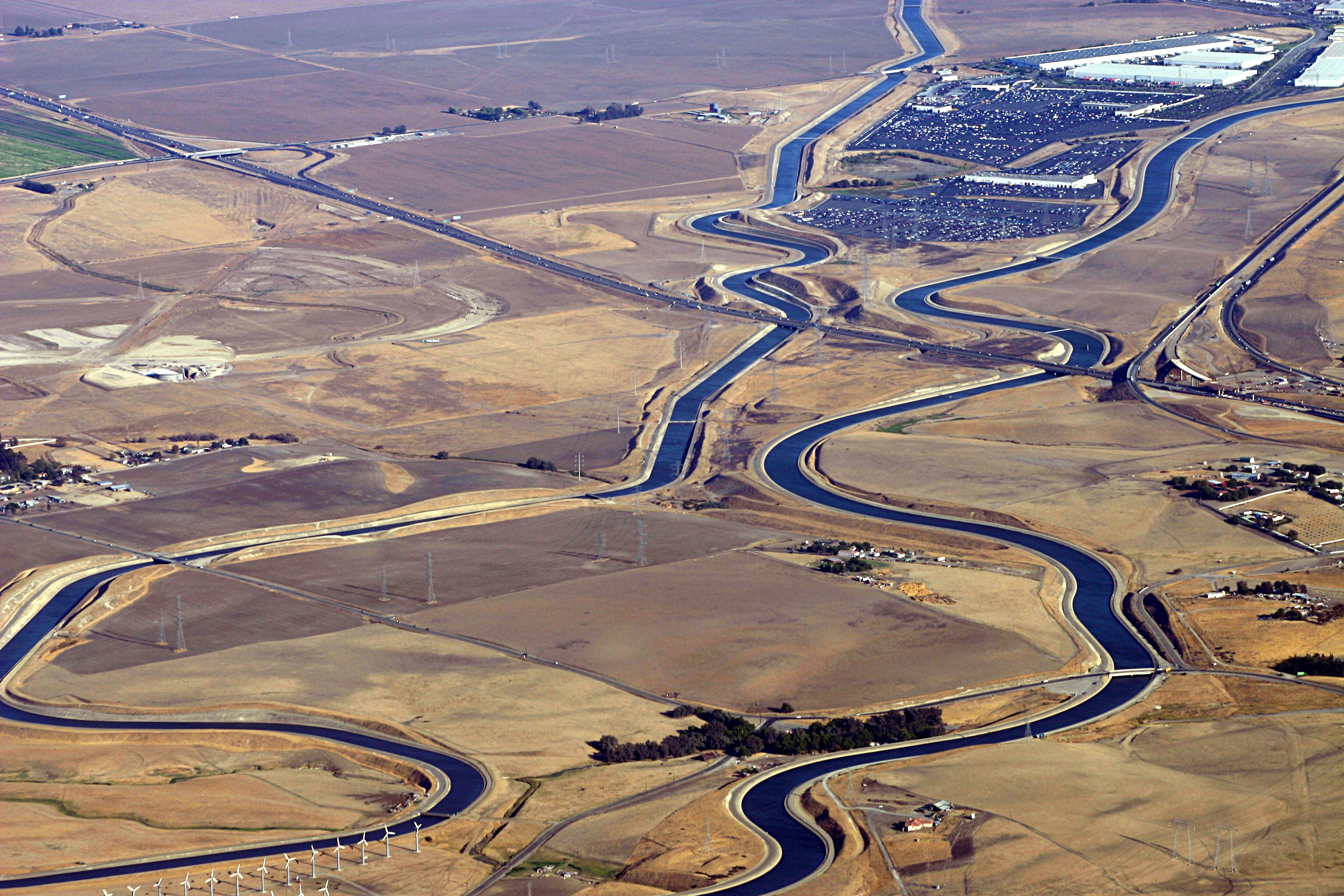
An aerial view of the California Aqueduct at the Interstate 205 crossing west of Tracy

The California State Water Project (SWP) is the largest state-built water system in the United States. The SWP transports water from the Feather River watershed to support agricultural, industrial, and urban needs. Supplying over two-thirds of California's population, the SWP was originally designed to deliver 4.2 million acre-feet (5.2 km^{3}), but in an average year delivers only 2.3 million acre-feet (2.8 km^{3}) due to incomplete infrastructure. Twenty-nine agencies hold contracts for SWP water. The contractors pay for SWP's major operating costs and have gradually reduced the $1.75 billion bond debt that supplied funds for initial construction. In the years since 1960, SWP has built 29 dams, 18 pumping plants, five hydroelectric power plants, and around 600 miles (970 km) of canals and pipelines.

The SWP system begins with reservoirs on upper tributaries of the Feather River. Oroville Dam creates the largest SWP reservoir. At 770 feet (230 m) above the riverbed, the dam is the tallest in the United States. The reservoir covers 15,000 acres (61 km^{2}) and holds 3.5 million acre-feet (4.3 km^{3}). Water travels from Lake Oroville to the Sacramento River. At Harvey O. Banks Delta Pumping Plant, which pulls SWP water into the Bethany Reservoir, around 2.2 million acre-feet (2.7 km^{3}) are extracted from the Delta each year. Water that flows to the south end of the San Joaquin Valley must be pumped over the Tehachapi Mountains. Because of this, the SWP is California's largest energy consumer, and even though the hydroelectric plants of the SWP generate 5,900 GWh per year, that is only a fraction of the energy needed to lift water over the Tehachapis. Below the Tehachapis the California Aqueduct splits, with the west branch storing water in Castaic and Pyramid Lake, and the east branch storing water in the Silverwood Lake reservoir.

=== The Central Valley Project ===
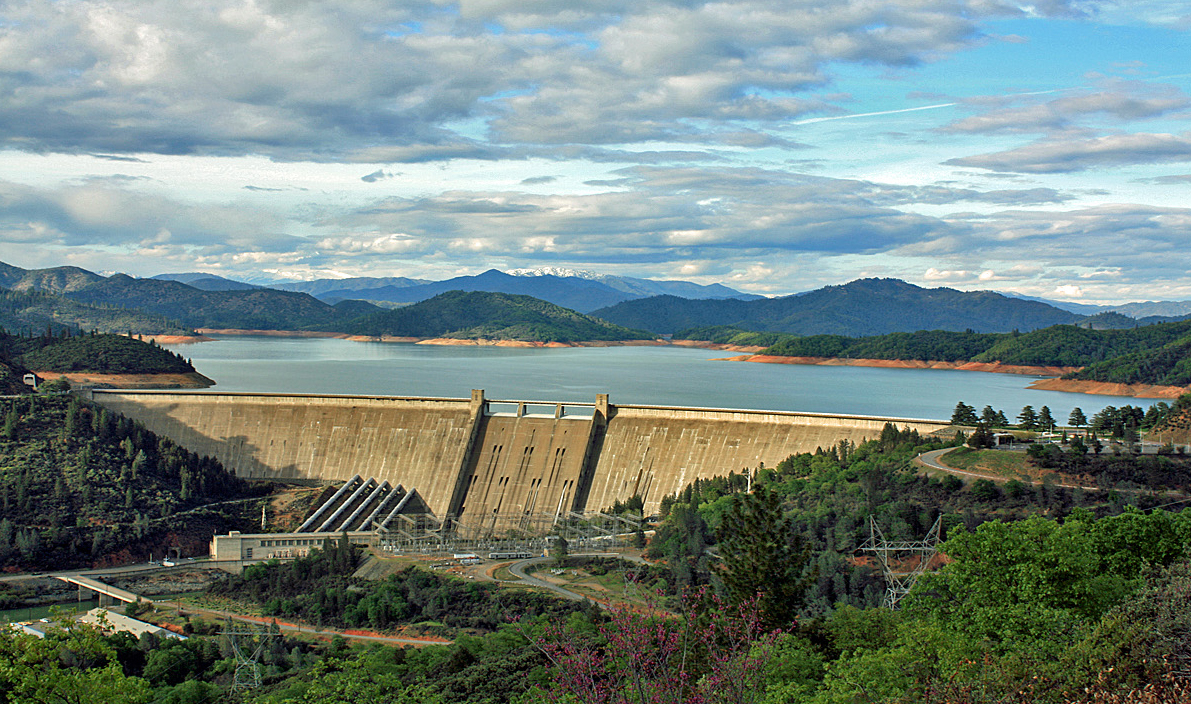
Shasta Dam in 2009

The CVP's original purpose was to tame seasonal flooding and to direct water to the south to irrigate 3 million acres (12,000 km^{2}) of farmland. The CVP is operated by the United States Bureau of Reclamation. As one of the largest water systems in the world it stores over 7 million acre-feet (8.6 km^{3}) of water, or 17 percent of the state's developed water. The CVP dams and diverts five major rivers: the Trinity, the Sacramento, the American, the Stanislaus, and the San Joaquin. Friant Dam, on the San Joaquin, was completed in 1944, forming Millerton Lake. This was one of 20 reservoirs in the CVP. Shasta Dam, the largest CVP storage facility, was completed in 1945. At Sacramento, American River water stored by Folsom Dam is added. 2.5 million acre-feet (3.1 km^{3}) are annually pumped from the Delta into the Delta-Mendota Canal. New Melones Dam on the Stanislaus River was finished in 1979, and the reservoir was filled in 1982.

The CVP has generated concerns regarding environmental damage, prices charged to farmers, and lax enforcement of farm size limitations. Bureau of Reclamation water was supposed to be used for farms limited to 160 acres (65 ha) (see Homestead Act). Under Spanish and Mexican land grants, however, there were only a few land owners, all of whom owned large tracts of land. A 1982 reform increased CVP area limits to 960 acres (3.9 km^{2}). In 1992, the Central Valley Project Improvement Act made fish and wildlife protection and restoration an authorized purpose of the CVP on an equal footing with other authorized purposes. 0.8 million acre-feet (0.99 km^{3}) of annual runoff were dedicated to environmental usage.

=== Colorado River Systems ===
The Colorado River is the source of 4.4 million acre-feet (5.4 km^{3}) per year for California. Six other states along the river's watershed (Wyoming, Nevada, Utah, Colorado, New Mexico, and Arizona) and Mexico, share allocated portions of river water. The Metropolitan Water District of Southern California, or MWD, holds priority water rights on the Colorado. It sells water to 95 percent of the South Coast region. Lake Mead, formed by Hoover Dam, is the primary reservoir in the Colorado River basin. The Colorado River Aqueduct begins 155 miles (249 km) downstream from Hoover Dam, and can carry 1.2 million acre-feet (1.5 km^{3}) annually.

An additional system diverts water from the Colorado River at the Imperial Diversion Dam provides waters to the Imperial and Coachella valleys as well as Yuma, Arizona, via the Alamo Canal, the Coachella Canal and the All-American Canal, which runs alongside the Mexican border. This system was also responsible for the accidental re-creation of the Salton Sea in 1905.

The Colorado is considered over-allocated, because apportionments were made on inaccurate measurements of annual runoff. Marc Reisner in Cadillac Desert noted that the Colorado is "unable to satisfy all the demands on it, so it is referred to as a 'deficit' river, as if the river were somehow at fault for its overuse". For years California took more than its share of the apportionment, because other states were not prepared to use their entire allotments. MWD became used to 0.8 million acre-feet (0.99 km^{3}) excess of water. Pressure from other Colorado river states caused the Secretary of the Interior to order California to show progress towards decreasing its dependency on the excess 0.8 million acre-feet (0.99 km^{3}), or face cuts. The Colorado River Water Use Plan called for Imperial and Coachella Valley agriculture to give up water in order to reallocate 0.8 million acre-feet (0.99 km^{3}) within the state. The plan's proposals generated much controversy, and the deadline arrived with no agreement reached. The Department of the Interior reduced MWD's access by 0.415 million acre-feet (0.512 km^{3}).

=== The Los Angeles Aqueduct ===
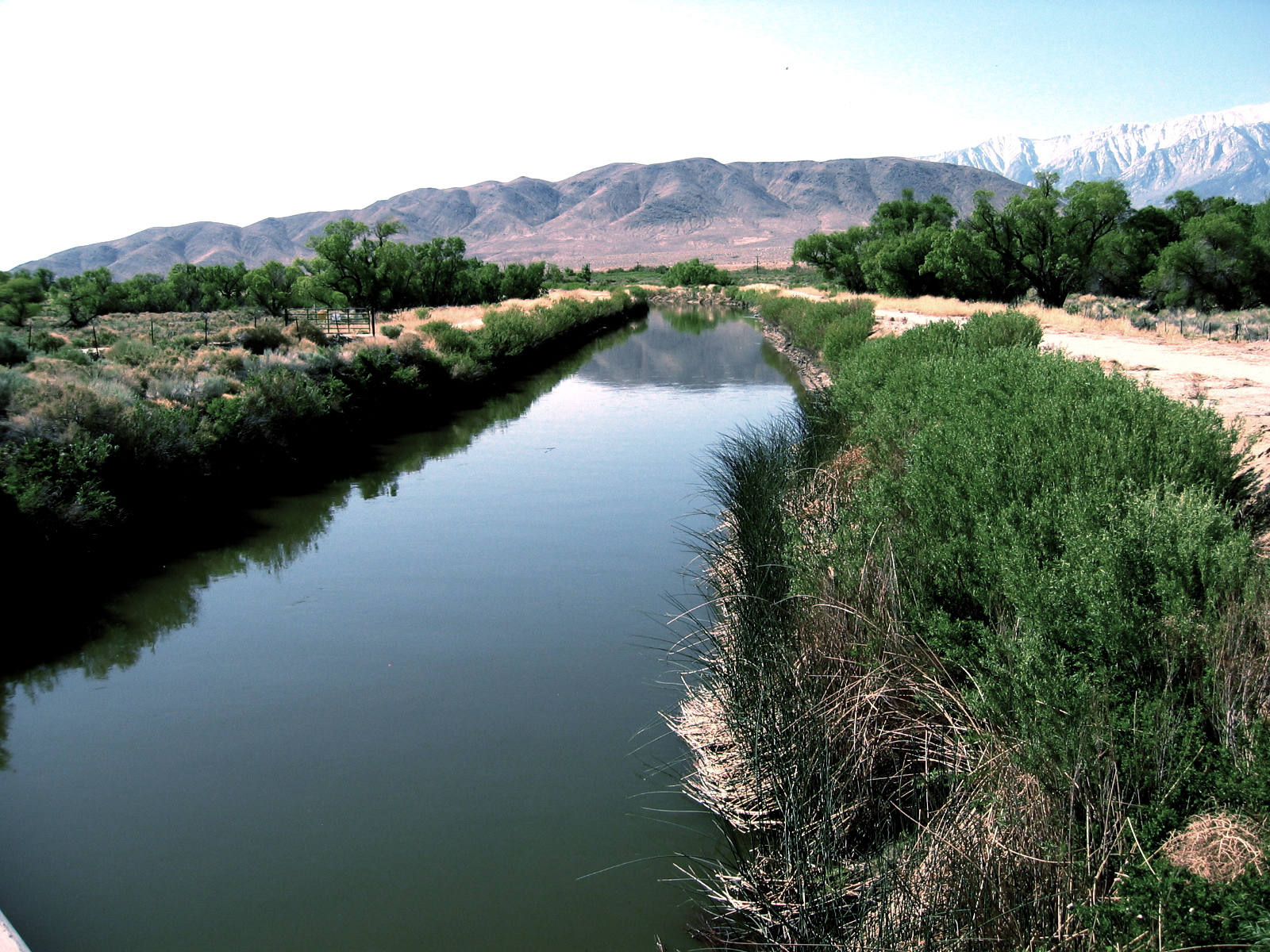
The Los Angeles Aqueduct in the Owens Valley

The Los Angeles Aqueduct carries water from the Eastern Sierra Nevada to Los Angeles. The construction of the aqueduct marked the first major water delivery project in California. The city purchased 300,000 acres (1,200 km^{2}) of land in the Owens Valley in order to gain access to water rights. The Los Angeles Department of Water and Power transports 0.4 million acre-feet (0.49 km^{3}) of Eastern Sierra Nevada water to the city each year. This growth clearly shows William Mulholland's observation that "Whoever brings the water, brings the people."

After four decades of diversion from the Mono Lake area, environmental damage created an environmental battle in the 1980s, with a victory for the Mono Lake proponents in 1994. Other problems arose when dust from the bed of Owens Lake (completely dried up by diversions) became a major source of air pollution in the southern Owens Valley. To restore Mono Lake, correct air-quality law violations, and rewater portions of the Owens River, Los Angeles has begun to reduce its dependence on Eastern Sierra Nevada water. This has mostly been achieved through water conservation. The city enacted a program offering free low-flow toilets to its customers.

=== Hetch Hetchy Aqueduct ===
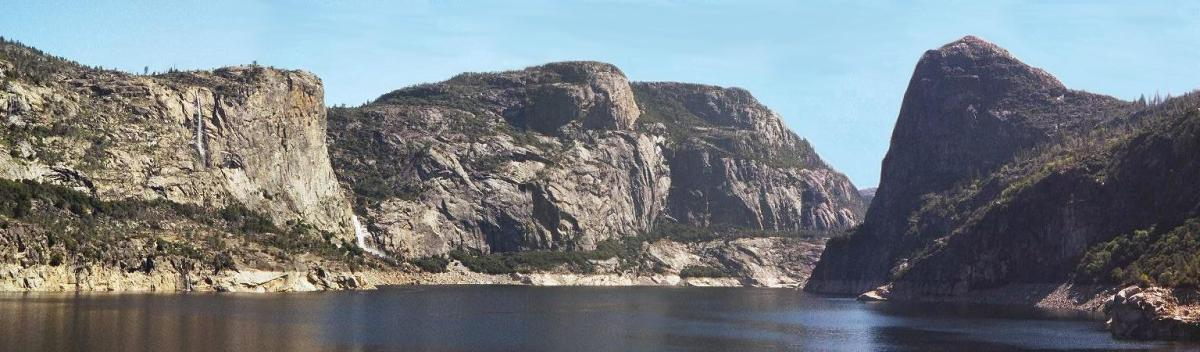
The Hetch Hetchy Valley

The Hetch Hetchy Aqueduct carries water from the Tuolumne River to San Francisco and other Bay Area regions. The system starts in Hetch Hetchy Valley, inside Yosemite National Park. The system also generates up to 400MW of electrical power, depending on rainfall, most of which is sent to San Francisco via city-owned power lines. After water leaves Hetch Hetchy, it passes through tunnels towards powerhouses. Three pipes then bring the water across the Central Valley. Concerns about the Hetch Hetchy Aqueduct's ability to withstand earthquakes led to a $1.7 billion bond, approved by voters in November 2002.

=== Mokelumne Aqueduct ===
The East Bay Municipal Utility District (EBMUD) serves 35 communities in Alameda and Contra Costa Counties, including Berkeley and Oakland. The Mokelumne River in the central Sierra Nevada is the source for almost all of EBMUD's water. EBMUD built the Pardee Dam across the Mokelumne in the foothills northeast of Stockton. South of Pardee is Camanche Reservoir, which regulates releases to serve downstream water rights holders. EBMUD holds almost 30,000 acres (120 km^{2}) in the Mokelumne River watershed and 25,000 acres (100 km^{2}) in other watersheds. EBMUD also has an American River water right that could be sent to the Mokelumne Aqueduct through the Folsom South Canal. The only time this has been done was during the drought years of 1977–78, when the water was actually pumped from the Delta. EBMUD preferred the cleaner water from the American River, but environmentalists and Sacramento had concerns about the impacts such a diversion would have on the river. The legal battle led to affirmation of EBMUD's water right, but modifications were also negotiated. The intake point was moved downstream, to maintain minimum flows in the American River before it merges with the Sacramento.

=== North Bay ===
The North Bay Aqueduct of the California State Water Project delivers an annual average of 39,309 acre⋅ft (48 million m^{3}) of water to urban communities and agricultural users in Napa, Solano, Sonoma and Marin counties. That water is diverted from the Sacramento-San Joaquin River Delta Estuary, a water hub that serves as the junction of south-, west-, and north-flowing rivers draining the Cascade and Sierra Nevada mountain ranges.

Certain municipalities north of San Francisco Bay, including Santa Rosa and Petaluma, are served by the Sonoma County Water Agency. Their primary water source is the Russian River. However, the Russian River owes its summer flow in large part to the Eel, which is bled off via a tunnel into Potter Valley (via the Potter Valley Project) and flows to a reservoir near Ukiah, Lake Mendocino. PG&E now owns the rights to this delivery system, as well as the long controversial history. As of 2025, the Round Valley Indian Tribes, who were historically affected by the diversion of the Eel, reached a water agreement with the California Department of Fish and Wildlife.

The cities of Vallejo, Fairfield, and Vacaville are served by the Solano County Water Agency, which transports water from Lake Berryessa and moves it south along the Putah South Canal. Marin County has the Marin Municipal Water District, the North Marin Water District, and the Inverness Public Utility District.

== Planning and management ==
The planning and management of water in California is subject to a vast number of laws, regulations, management plans, and historic water rights. The state agency responsible for water planning is the California Department of Water Resources.

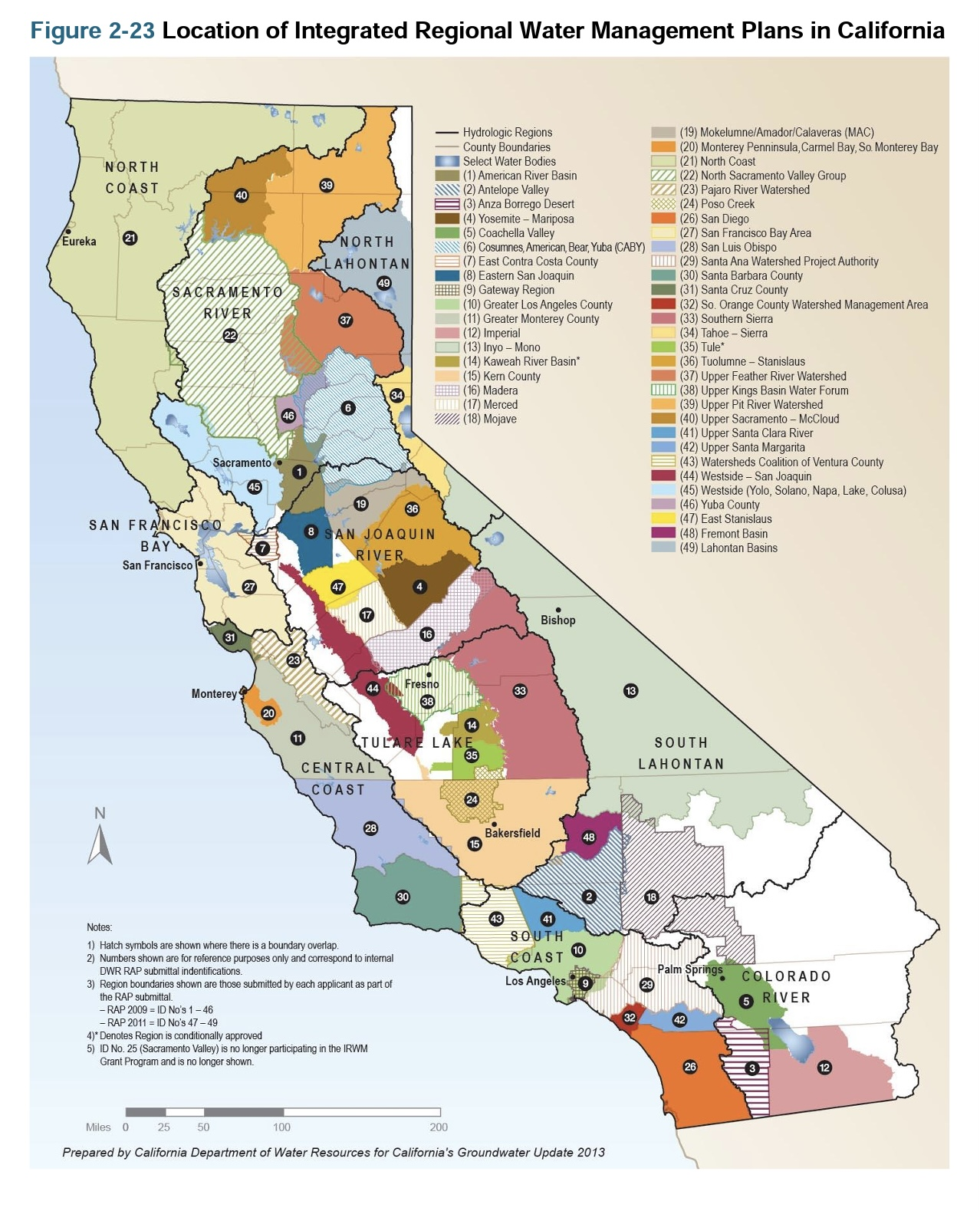
Map of California Integrated Regional Water Management Plans

=== California water plans ===
There have been several documents known as the "California Water Plan", with the most recent being published in 2013. Before the state of California started drafting comprehensive plans for the management of water in the state, the earliest plan for water distribution in California was an 1873 report. This was followed by a 1919 report called "Irrigation of Twelve Million Acres in the Valley of California". The 1919 report is the first comprehensive plan, and is often called the "Marshall Plan", after its author Col. Robert Bradford Marshall (not to be confused with the European program from 1948 of the same name). There have been many subsequent water plans and water plan updates, which were often issued as California Department of Water Resources bulletins. California Water Code provides guidance or the plan updates. Beginning in 1957, early Water Plan Updates were largely technical and focused on water supply development. Plans gradually became more comprehensive to address the state's growing conflicts over limited resources. Updates now present the status and trends of California's water-dependent natural resources; water supplies; and agricultural, urban, and environmental water demands for a range of plausible future scenarios. They also evaluate different combinations of regional and statewide resource management strategies to reduce water demand, increase water supply, reduce flood risk, improve water quality, and enhance environmental and resource stewardship. The evaluations and assessments performed for the updates help identify effective actions and policies for meeting California's resource management objectives in the near term and for several decades to come.

Since 2000, another major goal for each update has been to receive broad input and support from Californians. Preparation of these new millennial Water Plan updates has been widely viewed as exceptionally transparent and collaborative as the consensus seeking process is routinely cited by other agencies and states as a model for policy planning efforts. The approach involves: interest based dialog and exchange among teams, committees and the public to develop work products; multiple opportunities for review by different audiences; and integration and reconciliation of feedback from a variety of perspectives.

Update 2013 is based on the plan laid out by the administration of Governor Edmund G. Brown Jr. (Jerry Brown). That five-year plan, released in January 2014, outlines a succinct set of actions that together bring reliability, restoration, and resilience to California water resources, even as the state's population is expected to grow from 38 million to 50 million by 2049.

Three related themes distinguish Update 2013 from Update 2009. The five year time span reinforced the value of integrated water management, and Update 2013 closely examines the practices and policies that allow water managers to combine flood management, environmental stewardship, and surface water and groundwater supply actions to deliver multiple benefits across a region. Fundamental to that integrated approach is better alignment in the management of data, planning, policy-making, and regulation across local, State, tribal, and federal governments.

=== Safety concerns ===
Water purity has been an emerging issue in California, especially in communities with low-income residents. Aging infrastructure, coupled with a lack of research on the topic, has exacerbated this issue, with water health violations occurring in 7–8% of water systems a year. The San Joaquin Valley, a largely rural and agricultural area with 65% residents being people of color, is registered with the most water quality violations. Tulare, a city within San Joaquin Valley, has 99% of its residents relying on compromised groundwater, contrasted with Los Angeles County, with 11% of residents relying only on a contaminated water supply. These water violations often lead to purchased water sources and private ownership of water distribution, as private utilities appear to have larger bandwidth to serve a large population. Trade-offs often include greater inequity in water access, as private utilities face higher repercussions for delivering unsafe water and often decide to opt-out from serving under-resourced populations.

The U.S. Geological Survey analyzed the results of a 2002 study of 10 streams in California and discovered that the Sacramento River had the highest traces of acetaminophen, cholesterol and birth control hormones of any water source in the nation. Pharmaceutical discharge polluted by drug companies are relatively common in California water, with Southern California water tables especially susceptible to contamination.

=== Water rights ===
On more than one occasion, the California Supreme Court has noted that "the scope and technical complexity of issues concerning water resource management are unequalled by virtually any other type of activity presented to the courts." An example of this complexity is demonstrated in the case of National Audubon Society v. Superior Court.

==== Pueblo water rights ====
California recognizes water rights granted to pueblos (settlements) under the Spanish and Mexican governments, prior to the Treaty of Guadalupe Hidalgo. Under the doctrine, pueblos organized under the laws of Mexico or Spain have a water right to the yield of all streams and rivers flowing through the city and the groundwater aquifers lying below. Pueblo water rights are superior to all riparian and appropriative rights and cannot be lost by a failure to assert an interest or use the water. In addition, the pueblo's claim expands with the needs of the city and may be used to supply the needs of areas that are later annexed to the city. Los Angeles and San Diego are the only original pueblos to exercise their pueblo water rights in the courts.

Pueblo water rights are controversial. Some modern scholars and courts argue that the pueblo water rights doctrine lacks a historical basis in Spanish or Mexican water law.

==== Riparian water rights ====
A landowner who has their property border a river has a right to use that land. Under the riparian doctrine, "the owner of land has the right to divert the water flowing by his land for use upon his land, without regard to the extent of such use or priority in time". "Riparians on a stream system are vested with a common ownership such that in times of water shortage all riparians must reduce their usage proportionately."

Riparian water rights were inherited from the common law of England. Under the doctrine, property owners have correlative rights to the reasonable use of the water passing through their land adjacent to the watercourse. The right is part and parcel with the land itself and, in California, only accompanies those tracts that have always directly touched the water.

Riparian rights received legal recognition after California gained statehood. It then became law that owners that have property touching a water source have a right to that water and it cannot be appropriated by another party.

The English focus on landownership differs sharply from the "first in time, first in right" approach 49ers, who were generally trespassing on federal land, developed to wash hills into rivers. In Lux v. Haggin (1886) the California Supreme Court resolved the conflict by finding that riparian water rights are superior even to older prior appropriations. When in 1926 the Court went so far as to find that riparian owners did not need to put their water to beneficial use, the People amended the California Constitution to reverse the decision, establishing that no water in the state may be wasted.

While riparian rights are superior to appropriative rights and may survive dormant and unused, in 1979 the California Supreme Court found that the California State Water Resources Control Board has the power to assign unused riparian rights lower priority than existing prior appropriations.

==== Water rights by prior appropriation ====
"The appropriation doctrine confers upon one who actually diverts and uses water the right to do so provided that the water is used for reasonable and beneficial uses," regardless of whether that person owns land contiguous to the watercourse. In addition, all appropriative rights are subordinate to riparians or earlier appropriators. In times of shortage riparians are entitled to fulfill their needs before appropriators are entitled to any use of the water. "And, as between appropriators, the rule of priority is 'first in time, first in right.'" Beginning in 1914, a statutory scheme has provided the exclusive method of acquiring appropriation rights through the California State Water Resources Control Board. The modern system of prior appropriation water rights followed by California is characterized by five principles:

1. Exclusive right is given to the original appropriator, and all following rights are conditional upon precedent rights.
2. All rights are conditional upon beneficial use.
3. Water may be used on riparian lands or non-riparian lands (i.e. water may be used on the land next to the water source, or on land removed from the water source)
4. Diversion is permitted, regardless of the shrinkage of the river or stream.
5. The right may be lost through non-use.

Beneficial use is defined as agricultural, industrial, or urban use. Environmental uses, such as maintaining body of water and the wildlife that use it, were not initially regarded as beneficial uses in some states but have been accepted in some areas. Every water right is parameterized by an annual yield and an appropriation date. When a water right is sold, it maintains its original appropriation date.

==== Water reserved by the United States ====
Lands reserved by the United States government are accompanied by a corresponding reservation of water rights for as much water is needed to fulfill the purpose for which the reservation was made. Such reservations were made on behalf of Native American tribes, national parks, monuments and forests. Water rights reserved by the United States are defined by and controlled by federal law, and may conflict with state law because reserved water rights are neither riparian nor appropriative.

==== Area of origin watershed rights ====
California provides communities and other water users within watersheds senior status over appropriative water rights in limited circumstances. California area of origin laws include The County of Origin Law (1931), The Water Protection Statute (1933), and The Delta Protection Act (1959).

=== Adjudication ===
Since under the law, landowners can extract as much groundwater from their property as they can put to beneficial use, adjudication was used to determine who had the right to pump how much and to audit such usage. The courts appoint water masters to audit usage and otherwise enforce water rights, who are often management boards, the United States Department of the Interior, the California Department of Water Resources, or an individual.

=== Environmental concerns ===
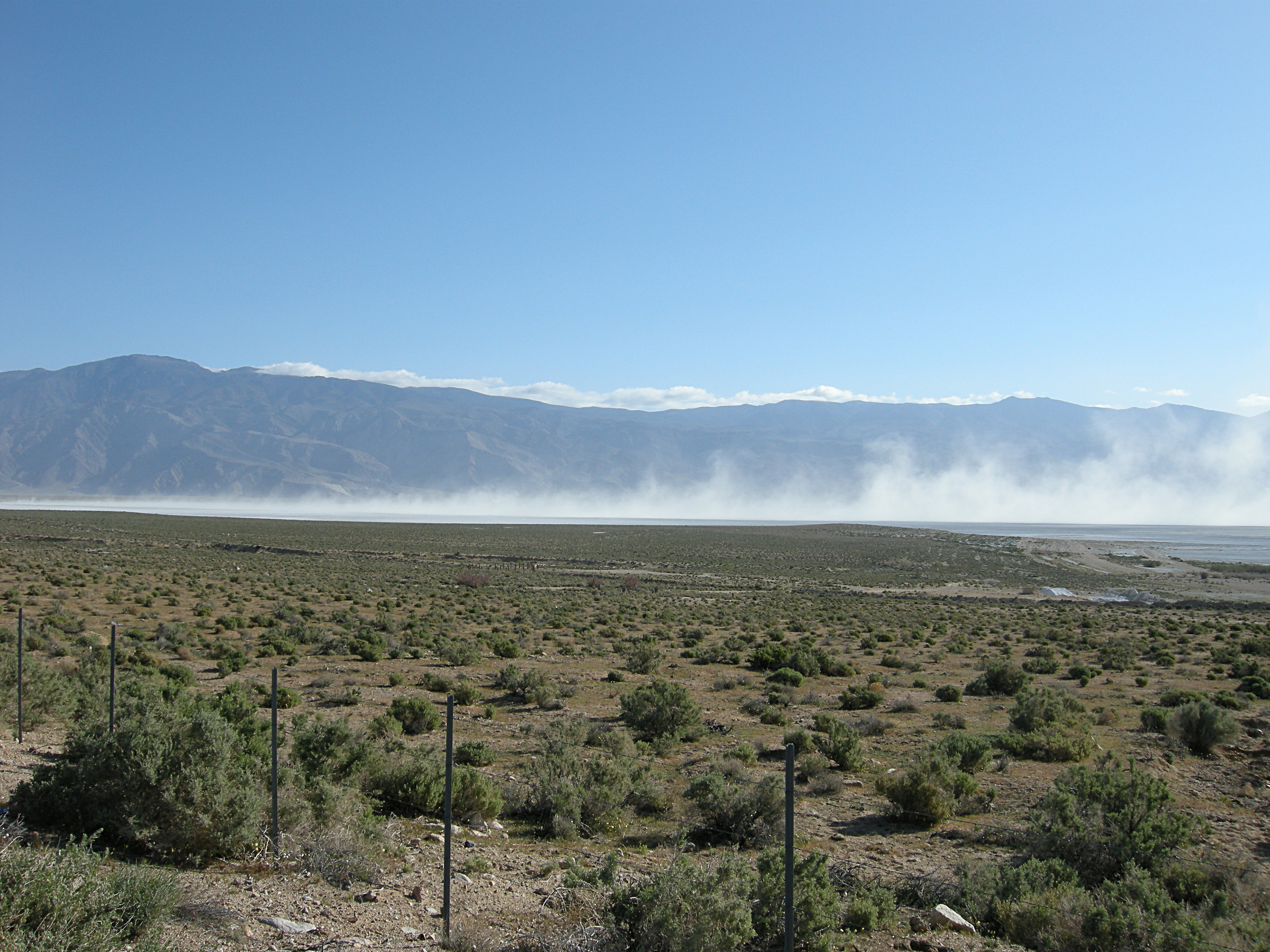
Dust blowing in the bed of Owens Lake in 2008. The lake went dry after diversions of its water to Los Angeles in the 1910s–20s.

The California water wars, a struggle between Los Angeles and certain parties within the Owens Valley, for water rights is but one example of the alleged wrongdoings of municipalities and people in securing adequate water supplies. The city of Los Angeles bought 300,000 acres (1,200 km^{2}) of land from residents of the Owens Valley and the water rights attached with them, for a fair price. The diverting of this water from the valley, transformed it from an agricultural valley into a dust bowl.

The creation of so many dams in California in order to enact a water diversion program for conventional agriculture has been met with criticism from most environmentalists, who have decried the negative effects of dams on ecosystems, particularly on migratory fish populations.

=== Predicted need for increased water supplies ===
It is projected that California's population will grow to almost 50 million by 2050. If the prediction comes true and there is no action to increase the water supply, the difference between water demand and supply would be between 2.0–6.0 million acre-feet (2.5–7.4 km^{3}) in the year 2020. Over the past five years California voters have approved $3 billion in bonds for water development and management. Many of these projects are incorporated in the CALFED Bay-Delta program, a federal-state program designed to reduce water supply conflicts. In August 2000 the state and federal governments approved the CALFED plan for water quality, water conservation and recycling, watershed administration, ecosystem re-establishment, delta levees, surface and groundwater storage, water transportation, and science. The plan has a thirty-year implementation period and was designed to incorporate changes in conditions and knowledge about the effects of specific projects. Stage 1 was initiated in 2000 and was designed as a seven-year program. The cost is estimated to be $8.7 billion. Stage 1 water yield within the next seven to ten years is estimated to be 2.9 million acre-feet (3.6 km^{3}) per year. As part of Stage 1, an Environmental Water Account was established through the purchase of 0.35 million acre-feet (0.43 km^{3}) of water. The EWA is used to protect fish and other wildlife without reducing water allocations to farms and municipalities.

A $7.5 billion water bond was approved in November 2014 with a 2 to 1 ratio. The bond-financing, which has been contentiously debated by the legislature and Governor Jerry Brown for the past few years, was said to improve the water quality, supply and infrastructure, if passed by voters.

== Major droughts in California history since 1900 ==
2000–2016 percent area in U.S. drought monitor categories

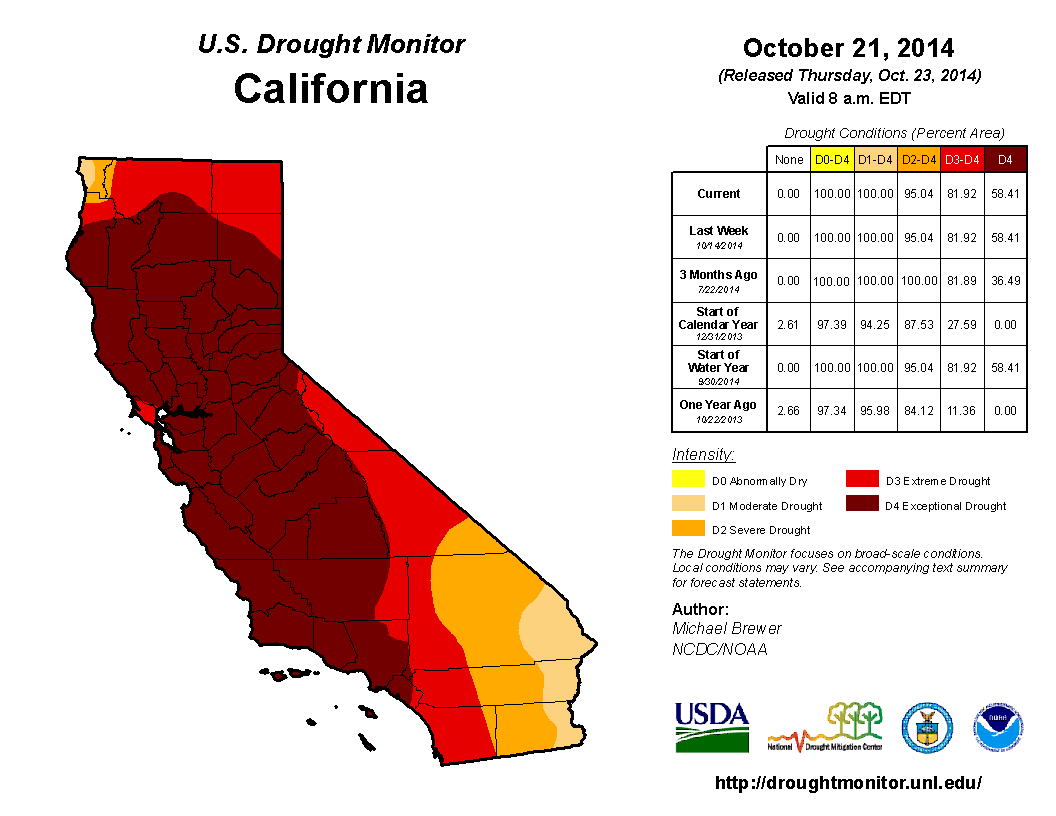
Status of drought in California in October 2014; map shows a condition of "exceptional drought" over 58% of the state

- 1917–21
- 1922–26
- 1928–37
- 1943–51
- 1959–62
- 1976–77
- 1987–92
- 2007–09
- 2012–15

== Impact of climate change ==
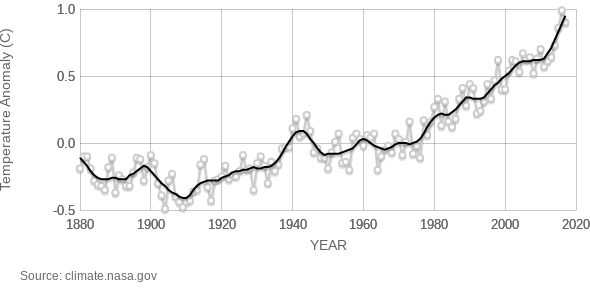
Average surface temperature anomalies (degrees Celsius) from 1880 to 2018 which demonstrate a rapid increase in the last few decades, with the most recent decade being the hottest on record

The burning of fossil fuels, which has been occurring at an unprecedented rate since the Industrial Revolution in the 1950s, has increased the concentration of greenhouse gases, particularly carbon dioxide and methane, in the atmosphere. In 2018, atmospheric carbon dioxide concentrations were 407 parts per million (ppm), and the Global Carbon Budget estimated that emissions would continue to grow by 0.6% each decade. Increased concentrations of greenhouse gases in the atmosphere have caused Earth's global surface temperatures to increase as well, a phenomenon called climate change. In 2018, the Intergovernmental Panel on Climate Change (IPCC) estimated that global average temperatures were increasing by 0.2 °C each decade and that the climate that year was 1 °C above preindustrial levels. The IPCC warns that anthropogenic emissions must decrease to limit climate change and its impacts; In California, the United States Environmental Protection Agency (EPA) predicts that sea level rise between 1–4 by 2100, more extreme weather conditions, and changes in precipitation due to climate change will have an impact on the state's water resources. In addition, these impacts will also change the state's water management systems and policies. According to the Public Policy Institute of California, the number of people and the value of property is increasing in flood prone regions of the state, including Sacramento, which means that the economic risk and threat to public safety is increasing. This reality is illustrated by the 2017 Oroville Dam failure where 180,000 were emergency evacuated and nearly $500 million in damages were accrued.

=== Sea level rise ===
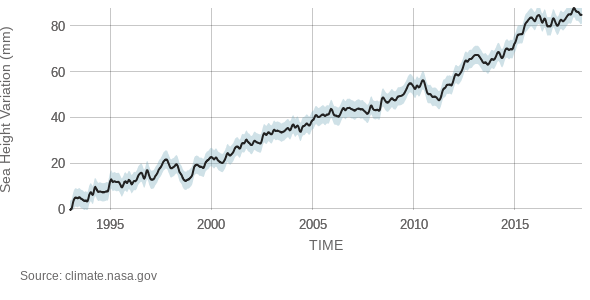
Sea level rise (millimeters) from 1980–2018 showing a steady increase over time

Although the Earth's oceans have been rising since the last ice age around 18,000 years ago as a result of melting sea and land ice, climate change is expected to accelerate the rate of global sea level rise. According to California's Fourth Climate Change Assessment, published in 2018, climate change will stimulate 54 inches of sea level rise by 2100 if greenhouse gas emissions continued at their current rates. This phenomenon is expected to cause coastal and estuarial flooding which will have both economic, environmental, and political ramifications in terms of water. In fact, scientists at the California Department of Water Resources believe that sea level rise will cause more salt water to intrude the Sacramento-San Joaquin Delta, the state's largest estuary, "the heart of the California water supply system and the source of water for 25 million Californians and millions of acres of farmland." Rising sea levels will also present flood hazards from storms and saltwater intrusion to coastal aquifers, according to the department's report.

=== Extreme weather conditions ===
Climate change will also cause more extreme weather conditions to occur in the state. In general, California's climate will become dryer and warmer over time. According to the United States Geological Survey, higher atmospheric surface temperatures and warmer ocean waters create fuel for more powerful storms, like hurricanes or monsoons, to develop and can lead to faster wind speeds during storms. This effect will cause more frequent and extreme droughts as well as extreme precipitation events that could cause flooding according to the National Climate Assessment. In fact, these effects are already evident in the state. For instance, the drought of 2012–2016 was the most extreme drought that the state has ever seen, and droughts were the most common disaster source in California in 2016 according to the State of California Hazard Mitigation Plan. In addition, monitoring by the California Department of Water Resources suggests that droughts have become more severe since the Industrial Revolution. In fact, the drought of 2012 to 2016 was the most extreme drought that the state has ever seen. At the same time, floods have also been worsening over time and will continue to become more extreme as atmospheric temperatures continue to increase.

=== Changes in precipitation ===
Although California has always had extreme daily, monthly, and annual variations in rainfall, the state's precipitation patterns have become increasingly variable over time, trending towards a drier climate as a result of global warming. Among all of the effects of climate change, changes in precipitation will be the hardest to predict. However, studies conducted by the California Natural Resources Agency suggest that there will be more dry days and years in the future with occasional downpours. More specifically, they estimate that the southern and inland regions of the state that are already dry to become more arid over time while the northern part of the state that currently receives a majority of the state's rainfall will continue to get wetter with the onset of climate change. In addition, the increase in atmospheric temperatures will also lessen the amount of precipitation that falls as snow. A 2017 UCLA study found that "anthropogenic warming reduced average snowpack levels by 25%, with mid-to-low elevations experiencing reductions between 26-43%." The implication of this precipitation pattern change is that immediate runoff will increase making the winter months a lot wetter, and that there will be a longer, warmer dry season in the spring and summer months. By the end of the century, the California Department of Water Resources predicts that the Sierra Nevada snowpack, the state's primary freshwater source, will decrease by 48-65% from its April 1 average.

=== Socio-economic and political implications ===
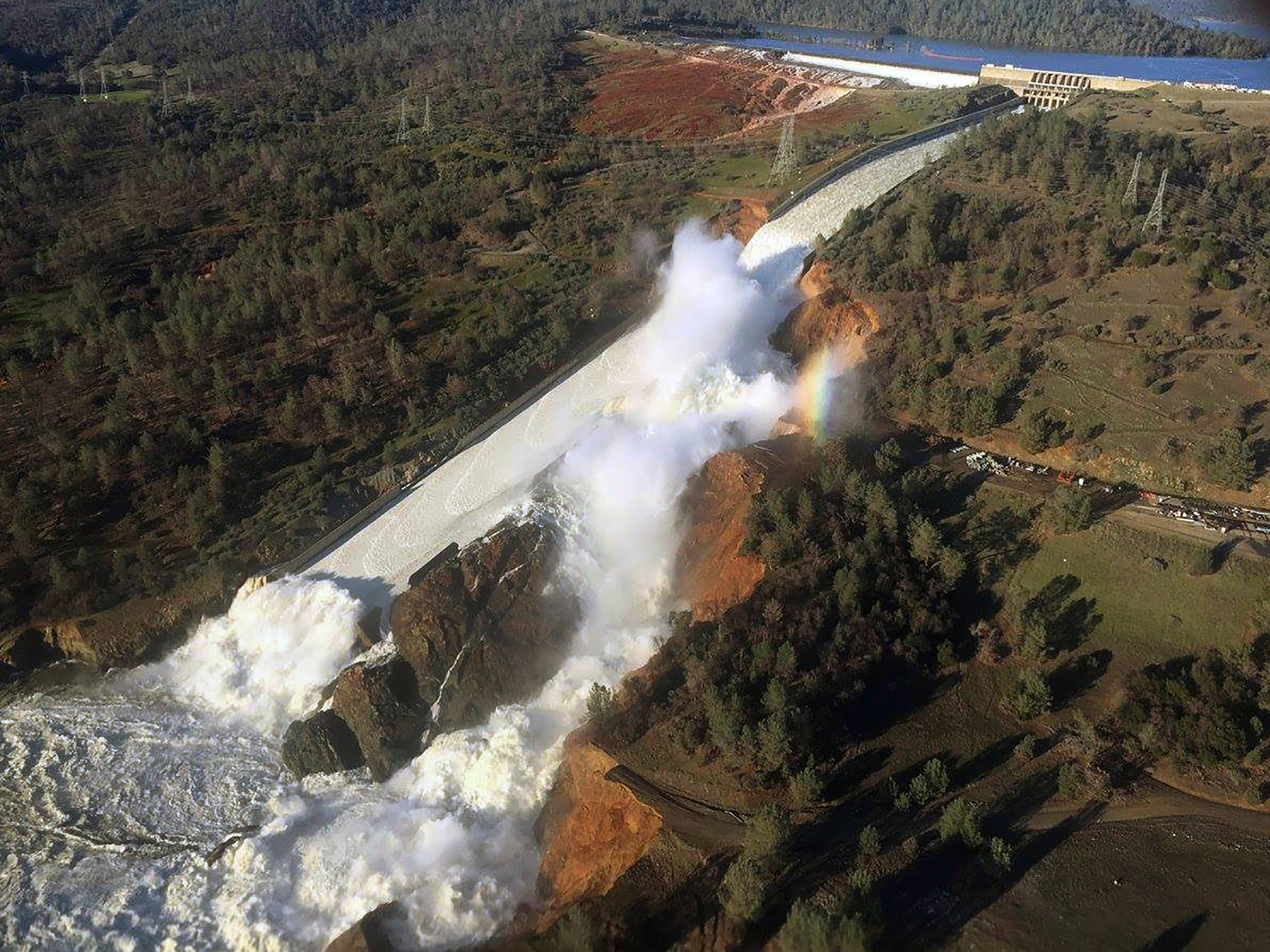
Oroville Dam's main spillway collapsing during the California 2017 floods, causing the evacuation of over 180,000 people living downstream along Feather River

Climate change impacts related to water, including sea level rise, more extreme weather conditions, and changes in precipitation, will have various effects in California. The state's water infrastructure, including dams, levees, and canals, are out of date, and they are particularly ill-suited in light of climate change. For instance, decreased snowpack and increased immediate rain runoff will increase the risk of infrastructure failure and flooding in the state. In fact, the state's water management systems are already failing as a result of changing precipitation as was the case in the 2017 Oroville Dam crisis. At the same time that climate change will increase flooding, it will also cause more frequent and extreme droughts as the state's climate continues to become drier over time. By utilizing the Palmer Drought Severity Index, the National Oceanic and Atmospheric Administration (NOAA) found that droughts in the state will become more severe in the next 40 years with the onset of climate change. This means that there will be less water for the state to distribute. California's Fourth Climate Change Assessment found that water storage in the state's two largest reservoirs, Shasta and Oroville, will decrease by one third under current management systems. This decreased water storage combined with less spring and summer runoff conflicts with the state's water demand. To date, most of California's precipitation falls as snow in the winter months, and it flows into rivers and streams in the spring and summer months as the snow melts. This is an important aspect of California's water management systems because most of the state's water demand occurs in the late summer months during the agricultural growing season. As temperatures continue to increase this effect will diminish, and the state will have to find a way to store water from the winter months to the summer months when it is most needed.

== Archives relating to California water ==
The California Water Documents collection in the Claremont Colleges Digital Library is a valuable online resource of archived materials related to California's water history. Additionally, the collection has digitized materials relating to the creation and operation of both the Central Valley Project and the California State Water Project as well as their component units. The items represented in the Claremont Colleges Digital Library are part of a larger collection entitled the Water Resources Collection in Special Collections at Claremont Colleges' Honnold/Mudd Library. The Water Resources Collection was started in the 1930s by Librarian Willis Holmes Kerr and Librarian and Claremont Colleges' Trustee John Treanor. These librarians' interest in California's water problem led them to start collecting a variety of documents related to water history and usage from around the state. It includes reports of engineers, annual reports and minute books of boards of directors of water companies, documents of federal and state governments, promotional pamphlets, and newspaper clippings. Most of the documents focus on the water history from the first half of the 20th century, but there are additional, more recent publications included, which have been donated by Claremont Graduate University Professor Merrill Goodall. The California Water Documents collection is currently a work in progress at the Claremont Colleges Digital Library.

The Water Resources Collections and Archives is located at the University of California, Riverside and features a comprehensive collection of water-resource related documents.

== See also ==
- California water wars
- California Water Fix and Eco Restore plan
- Groundwater-related subsidence
- List of lakes in California
- List of largest reservoirs of California
- Newlands Reclamation Act, a 1902 federal law that funded irrigation projects for 20 western states
- Sustainable Groundwater Management Act
- Water-energy nexus
- Northern Cyprus Water Supply Project
- California water resource region

== Bibliography ==
- Carle, David (2004). Introduction to Water in California. Berkeley: University of California Press.
- Green, Dorothy (2007). Managing Water: Avoiding Crisis in California. University of California Press. ISBN 978-0-520-25326-1. OCLC 85692856.
- Reisner, David (1993). Cadillac Desert. Penguin. ISBN 0-14-017824-4.
- Warner, Richard E.; Hendrix, Kathleen M. (1984). California Riparian Systems: Ecology, Conservation, and Productive Management. University of California Press. p. 1035. ISBN 978-0-520-05035-8.
