= Colorado River hydrologic region =

Regional subdivision, CA Dept of Water Resources

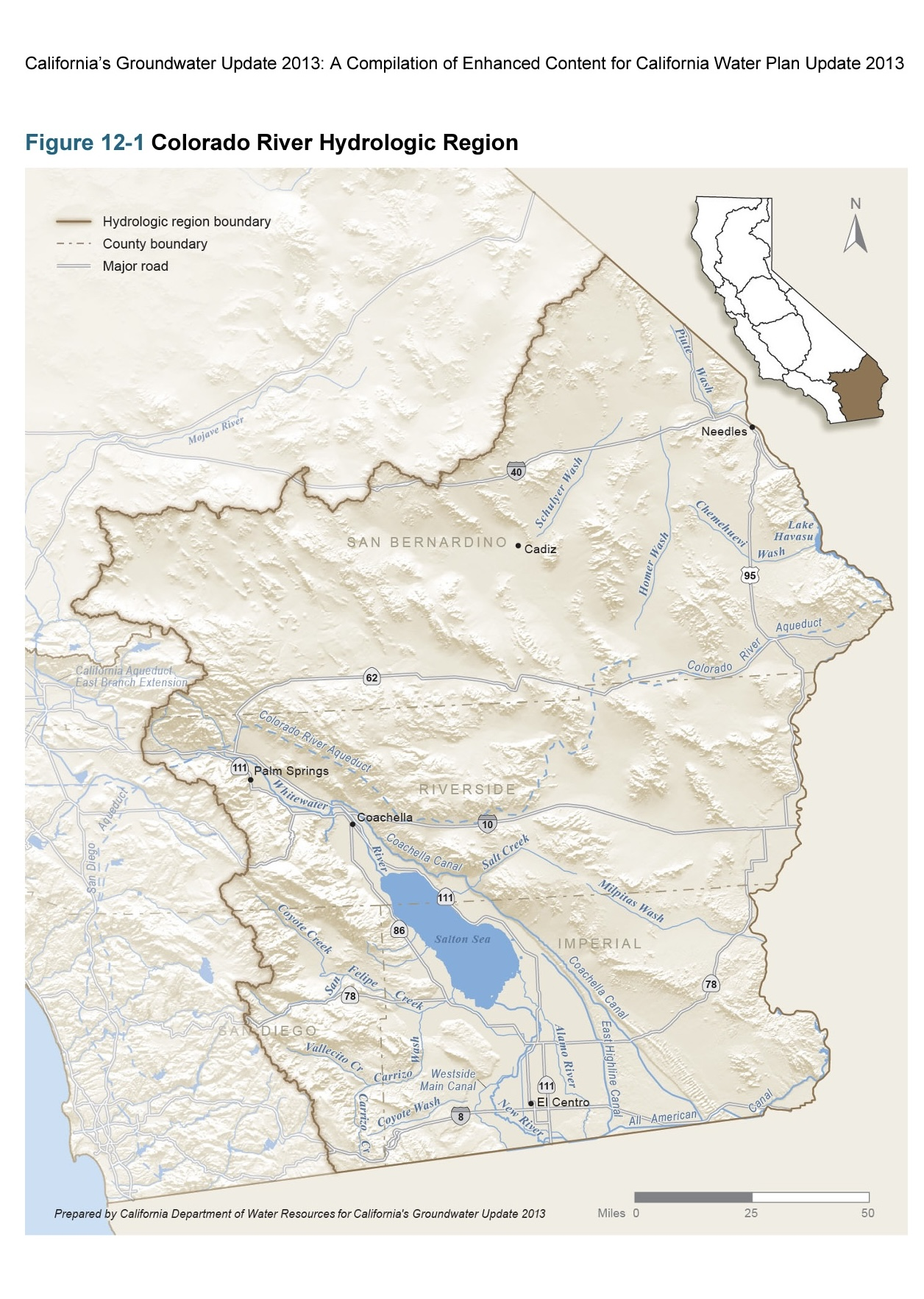
Colorado River hydrologic region map (2013)

The Colorado River hydrologic region of California is one of the 10 major hydrologic regions of the state as identified by the California Department of Water Resources.

The Colorado River hydrologic region has a surface area of about 20,000 mi^{2} (52,000 km^{2}), and includes all of Imperial County, and portions of Riverside, San Bernardino, and San Diego. With an average of 5.5 in (140 mm) rain annually, this is the most arid hydrologic region of the state. The Colorado River drainage basin is the major watershed of this region. The Colorado River hydrologic region has 71 state-recognized alluvial groundwater basins and subbasins.

== Alluvial groundwater basins of the Colorado River hydrologic region ==
- 7-1 Lanfair Valley groundwater basin
- 7-2 Fenner Valley groundwater basin
- 7-3 Ward Valley groundwater basin
- 7-4 Rice Valley groundwater basin
- 7-5 Chuckwalla Valley groundwater basin
- 7-6 Pinto Valley groundwater basin
- 7-7 Cadiz Valley groundwater basin
- 7-8 Bristol Valley groundwater basin
- 7-9 Dale Valley groundwater basin
- 7-10 Twentynine Palms Valley groundwater basin
- 7-11 Copper Mountain Valley groundwater basin
- 7-12 Warren Valley groundwater basin
- 7-13 Deadman Valley groundwater basin
- 7–13.01 Deadman Lake
- 7–13.02 Surprise Spring
- 7-14 Lavic Valley groundwater basin
- 7-15 Bessemer Valley groundwater basin
- 7-16 Ames Valley groundwater basin
- 7-17 Means Valley groundwater basin
- 7-18 Johnson Valley Area
- 7–18.01 Soggy Lake
- 7–18.02 Upper Johnson Valley groundwater basin
- 7-19 Lucerne Valley groundwater basin
- 7-20 Morongo Valley groundwater basin
- 7-21 Coachella Valley groundwater basin - see Coachella Valley Water District
- 7-21.01 Indio
- 7-21.02 Mission Creek
- 7-21.03 Desert Hot Springs
- 7-21.04 San Gorgonio Pass
- 7-22 West Salton Sea
- 7-24 Borrego Valley groundwater basin
- 7-25 Ocotillo-Clark Valley groundwater basin
- 7-26 Terwilliger Valley groundwater basin
- 7-27 San Felipe Valley groundwater basin
- 7-28 Vallecito-Carrizo Valley groundwater basin
- 7-29 Coyote Wells Valley groundwater basin
- 7-30 Imperial Valley groundwater basin
- 7-31 Orocopia Valley groundwater basin
- 7-32 Chocolate Valley groundwater basin
- 7-33 East Salton Sea
- 7-34 Amos Valley groundwater basin
- 7-35 Ogilby Valley groundwater basin
- 7-36 Yuma Valley groundwater basin
- 7-37 Arroyo Seco Valley groundwater basin
- 7-38 Palo Verde Valley groundwater basin
- 7-39 Palo Verde Mesa
- 7-40 Quien Sabe Point Valley groundwater basin
- 7-41 Calzona Valley groundwater basin
- 7-42 Vidal Valley groundwater basin
- 7-43 Chemehuevi Valley groundwater basin
- 7-44 Needles Valley groundwater basin
- 7-45 Piute Valley groundwater basin
- 7-46 Canebrake Valley groundwater basin
- 7-47 Jacumba Valley groundwater basin
- 7-48 Helendale Fault Valley groundwater basin
- 7-49 Pipes Canyon Fault Valley groundwater basin
- 7-50 Iron Ridge Area
- 7-51 Lost Horse Valley groundwater basin
- 7-52 Pleasant Valley groundwater basin
- 7-53 Hexie Mountain Area
- 7-54 Buck Ridge Fault Valley groundwater basin
- 7-55 Collins Valley groundwater basin
- 7-56 Yaqui Well Area
- 7-59 Mason Valley groundwater basin
- 7-61 Davies Valley groundwater basin
- 7-62 Joshua Tree
- 7-63 Vandeventer Flat
