= Borrego Valley groundwater basin =

Southern California geographical feature

Coordinates: 33.1620°N 116.1891°W

Borrego Valley Groundwater Basin, located in the very southern region of California, is one of the driest basins in the state. With climate change predicted to have strong effects into foreseeable future, the region is viewed with a skepticism in the sustainable use of water at current rates of consumption. Both natural and man-made geographic divisions within this basin allow for a closer inspection of the various management techniques implemented throughout the years, and provide a basis for what may be pursued for an uncertain future.

Borrego Valley is groundwater basin 7-24 with California's Colorado River hydrologic region.

== Geography of region ==
The Borrego Valley Groundwater Basin is housed underneath the Borrego Valley, which lies in both San Diego and Imperial counties of southern California. It reaches from the San Ysidro Mountains in San Diego County, to the east, where it enters Imperial County. As of 2016, the California Department of Water Resources split this basin into two sub-basins, Borrego Springs and Ocotillo Wells. The total surface area of this basin is 150,000 acres (240 square miles), encompassing three aquifers throughout the valley.

The natural landscape of this area consists mostly of shrublands, rocky outcrops and sediment, with sparse forested areas. The altitudes in this region ranges from 30 feet below sea level in the Lower Borrego Valley, and exceeds 4,500 ft above sea level in the San Ysidro Mountains. The average amount of precipitation gained in the Borrego Valley basin is usually less than 5 inches, and falls throughout the year, due to the climate being mostly the same year-round. It is mostly arid and dry, with a slightly cooler winter.

The valley contains three aquifers: the upper, middle, and lower. The uppermost aquifer is made of alluvial, fan, playa and eolian deposits from the time between the Holocene and Pleistocene, and is up to 1,000 feet thick at the northern end of the basin. This layer provides the main source of water for the Borrego Valley. Beneath this layer lies the middle and lower aquifers, containing Pleistocene-age continental deposits such as consolidated sand, gravel, and boulders. The middle aquifer is thickest in the center of the valley, measuring 700 feet, while the lower aquifer reaches depths of 1800 feet in the southern portion.

=== Borrego Springs Sub-Basin ===
This region lies exclusively in San Diego County, with its northernmost edge in the Santa Rosa Mountains, and the San Felipe / Yaqui Ridge anticline and San Felipe fault in the south. At the western boundary, the San Ysidro Mountains provide the demarcation, while the eastern edge is defined by both the Coyote Creek and Superstition Mountain faultlines. Coyote Creek flows into the valley toward Borrego Sink, the prominent collection point for runoff, that sometimes overflows into the San Felipe Wash. Flow between the sub-basins is inhibited due to the immense alluvial sediments in Borrego Springs being cut off from the San Felipe Wash by the presence of large geologic structures. The effect had on each sub-basin is a reduced influence of groundwater pumping; the pumping of water from one area will not easily effect the next area.

=== Ocotillo Wells Sub-Basin ===
Unlike Borrego Springs, this sub-basin lies in both San Diego and Imperial counties. The westernmost region of Ocotillo Wells lies along Fish Creek and the Coyote Mountains, and a surface drainage divide extending from the Coyote Mountains to the Superstition Mountains provides the eastern boundary. Groundwater in this basin is sourced from the mountains to the northeast, similar to the Borrego Springs sub-basin.

=== Recreation ===
This scenic area provides ample opportunity for hiking, observing nature, golfing, and trips to the nearby Anza-Borrego Desert State Park. There is also an assortment of camping locations, as well as wildflower and wildlife viewing areas.

=== Uses of groundwater ===
While this region consists of desert, seemingly counter-intuitive uses of water persist. These include irrigation, not only of agricultural fields, but also vegetated landscapes like golf resorts. Another main water use, though a bit more practical, is the use of septic systems to dispose of wastewater. From 1945 to 2010, a decline of up to two feet per year in groundwater levels occurred, mainly in the northern area of Borrego Valley, where agriculture predominates.

As of 2010, a total of 50 wells were used for agricultural purposes, while eight service golf courses, and residential users rely on 14. More wells exist or are planned, but only 20 of the existing ones are monitored in their usage.

Groundwater use by the agricultural sector, recreation, municipalities, and even Anza-Borrego Desert State Park cumulatively required four times as much water as what can naturally recharge in the basin. Due to this, the U.S. Geological Survey and Borrego Water District began working together to develop a better understanding of Borrego Valley's hydrogeology, in order to know what hydrologic effects might arise from future land development projects.

=== Groundwater availability and quality ===
==== Availability ====
Groundwater availability is worrisome for the Borrego Valley because water levels have decreased more than 100 feet in some areas of the basin. The Borrego Valley Hydrologic Model was created to recreate historic conditions so that past movement and use of both surface and groundwater could be analyzed, in hopes of addressing what future conditions may hold for the valley. Groundwater becomes available via percolation from various intermittent streams, such as Coyote Creek, which flow from the mountains in the northwest. It is estimated that a total 5,500,000 acre feet of groundwater can be stored in the Borrego Springs sub-basin, but as much time has passed, and over-drafting has occurred, the storage capacity may be more limited. The Ocotillo Wells sub-basin was estimated to be able to hold roughly 6,250,000 acre feet, but a similar situation to Borrego Springs plays into the shrinkage of capacity.

==== Quality ====
Groundwater quality is extremely important to this region, as it is the only source of water available for agriculture, recreation, and general public use. Groundwater quality in this region is mostly affected by the available quantity. This is to be expected, as the concentration of dissolved solids will become greater in groundwater stocks that are decreasing in volume. One issue that is associated with this is that as groundwater levels fluctuate, their ability to flow from underlying aquifers to wells is impacted, and can cause erratic amounts of present toxicants to either increase or decrease in the water. An analysis on historic water quality data from the Borrego Valley Groundwater Basin performed by the U.S. Geological Survey concluded that total dissolved solids (TDS) and nitrate in the upper level of the aquifer exceeded the water-quality thresholds for each given substance (500mg/L and 10 mg/L respectively). TDS, sulfates, and nitrates were found to have variable levels throughout the upper aquifer as well as geographic location within the basin. This same study examined the rate of groundwater recharge for the basin, and found that very little is actually occurring, mostly attributed to changing climatic conditions. Instead of water percolating down into this basin, the water has been shifted in its area of deposition, so that recharge is happening adjacent to the bordering mountain ranges.

=== Municipality ===
The creation of the Borrego Water District in 1962 stemmed from the community wanting to protect the valley's groundwater from being sent to Salton Sea area, where much development was taking place. The Borrego Water District (BWD) is the only body to serve the needs of about 800 customers with nearly 1,600 acre feet per year thru 2,100 metered water connections, provides sewage treatment, flood control, and pest (gnat) management in select zones within the service area.

The Sustainable Groundwater Management Act requires that each basin deemed high or medium priority in the state forms a Groundwater Sustainability Agency, in which the Borrego Valley Groundwater Basin falls. The goals for these GSA's are to "avoid “undesirable results” in groundwater elevations, storage levels, water quality degradation, land subsidence, seawater intrusion and downstream interconnected water impacts," all by July 2019. Estimates made in 2015 by the U.S. Geological Survey say that the over draft of the basin is about 13,000 acre feet per year (4.2 billion gallons). This is adds up to be around 70% of the current use of water throughout the entire basin, so the GSA associated with the Borrego Valley Groundwater Basin aims to reduce yearly water usage from 19,100 acre feet down to 5,700 is needed for sustainability.
