= Northern Mojave–Mono Lake water resource subregion =

Second-level USGS hydrologic unit system subdivision

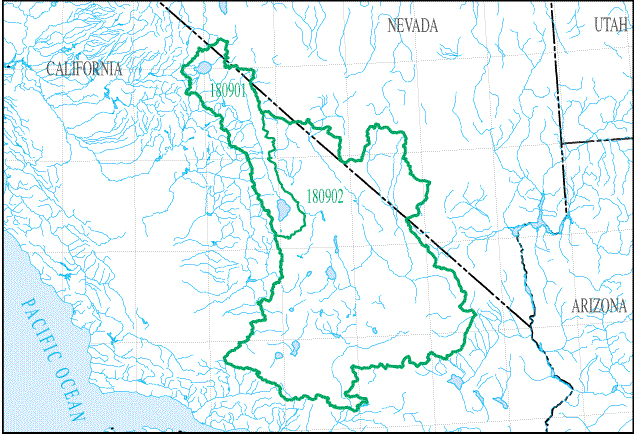
There are two water resource basin subdivisions of the Northern Mojave–Mono Lake subregion (HUC 1809)

Northern Mojave–Mono Lake water resource subregion (HUC 1809) is one of 10 water resource subregions within the California water resource region and is one of 222 water resource subregions in the federally organized United States hydrologic unit system.

The tiers of the classification system, in order from largest to smallest, are regions, subregions, basins (formerly accounting units), subbasins (formerly cataloging units), watersheds, and subwatersheds. These geographic areas contain either the drainage area of a major river, or the combined drainage areas of a group of rivers.

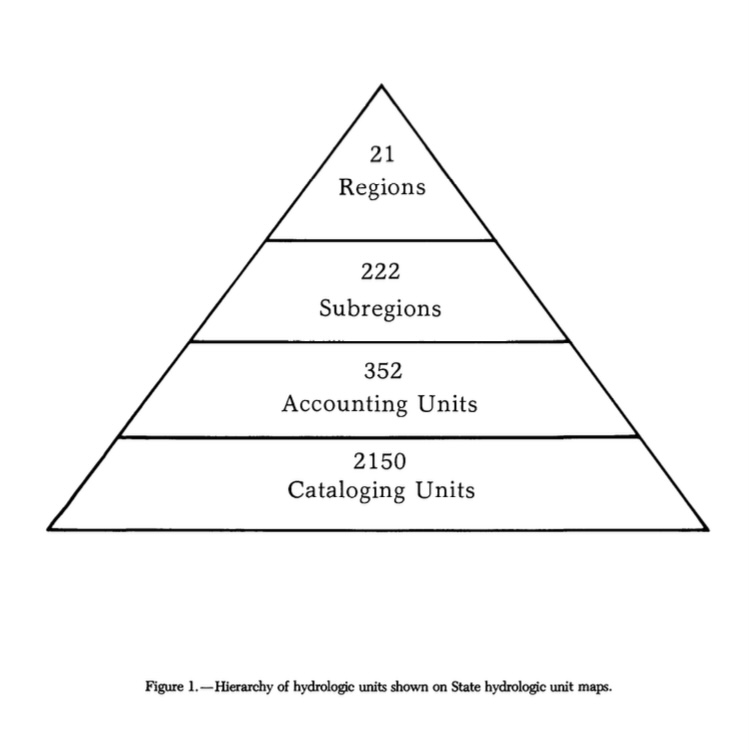
Hierarchy of United States hydrological units c. 1984

The Northern Mojave–Mono Lake subregion is approximately 28,000 sq mi (73,000 km^{2}) and includes closed desert basins that discharge into south-central California, including Mono Lake, Owens Lake, Death Valley, and the Upper Mojave Desert. The Northern Mojave–Mono Lake subregion is composed of two third-level hydrological units called water resource basins (formerly accounting units), each with its own 6-digit hydrologic unit code. These two basins are further subdivided into a total of 11 water resource subbasins, each with its own 8-unit hydrologic code.

== List of Northern Mojave–Mono Lake subregion basins ==
Basin HUC	Basin name	Basin description	Basin location	Basin size	Basin map
180901	Mono–Owens Lakes basin	Mono Lake and Owens Lake closed basins		4,310 sq mi (11,200 km^{2})	HUC180901
180902	Northern Mojave basin	Closed desert basins that discharge into south-central California, including Death Valley and the Upper Mojave Desert, excluding Mono Lake and Owens Lake		23,600 sq mi (61,000 km^{2})	HUC180902

== See also ==
- South Lahontan hydrologic region
