= List of California hydrologic regions =

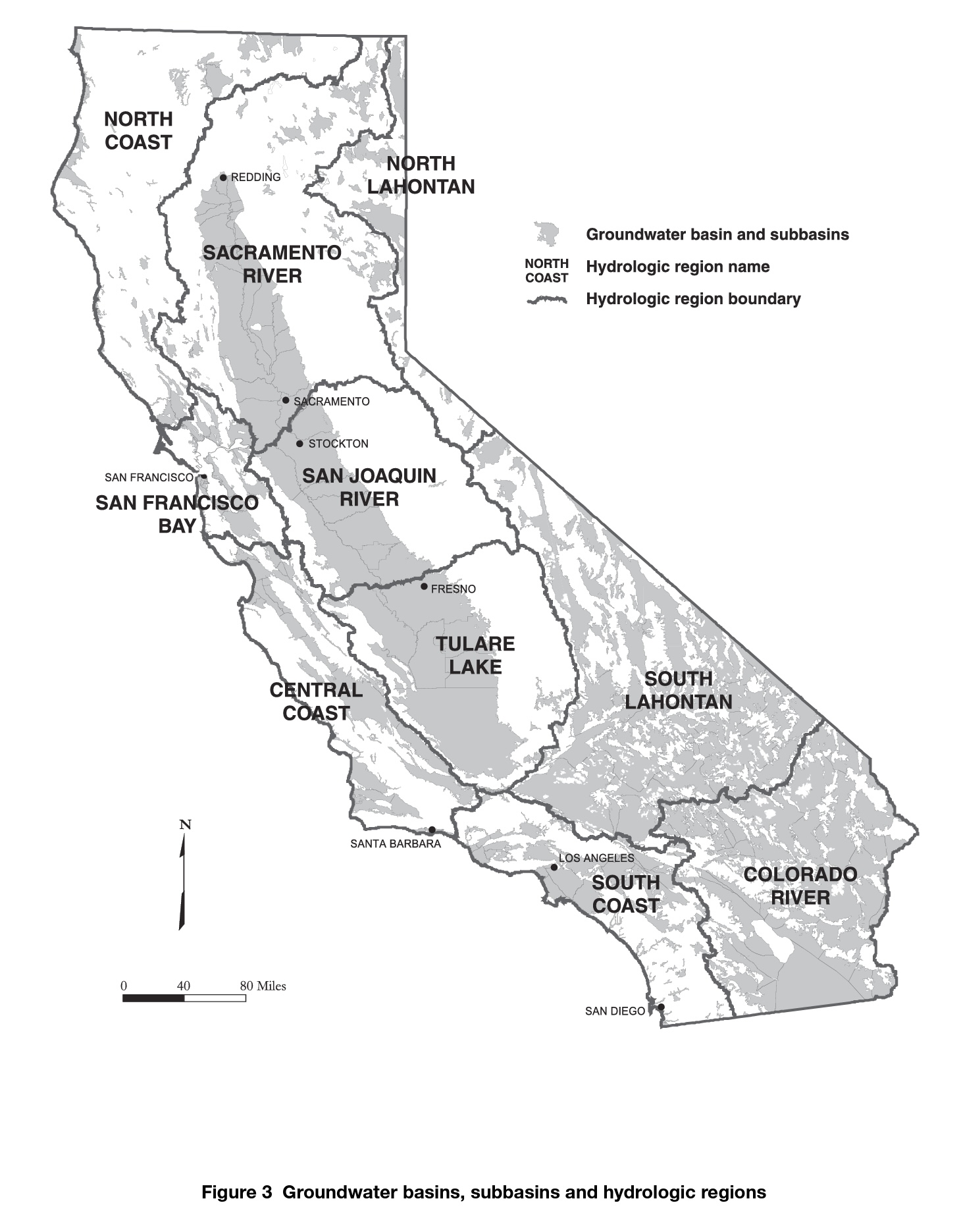
California groundwater basins, subbasins, and hydrologic regions

The California Department of Water Resources recognizes 10 hydrologic regions and three additional drainage areas within the U.S. state of California. The hydrologic regions are further subdivided into 515 groundwater basins.

1. North Coast hydrologic region
2. Sacramento River hydrologic region
3. North Lahontan hydrologic region
4. San Francisco Bay hydrologic region
5. San Joaquin River hydrologic region
6. Central Coast hydrologic region
7. Tulare Lake hydrologic region
8. South Lahontan hydrologic region
9. South Coast hydrologic region
10. Colorado River hydrologic region
11. Northern Central Valley drainage area
12. Mid-Central Valley drainage area
13. Southern Central Valley drainage area

== Additional images ==
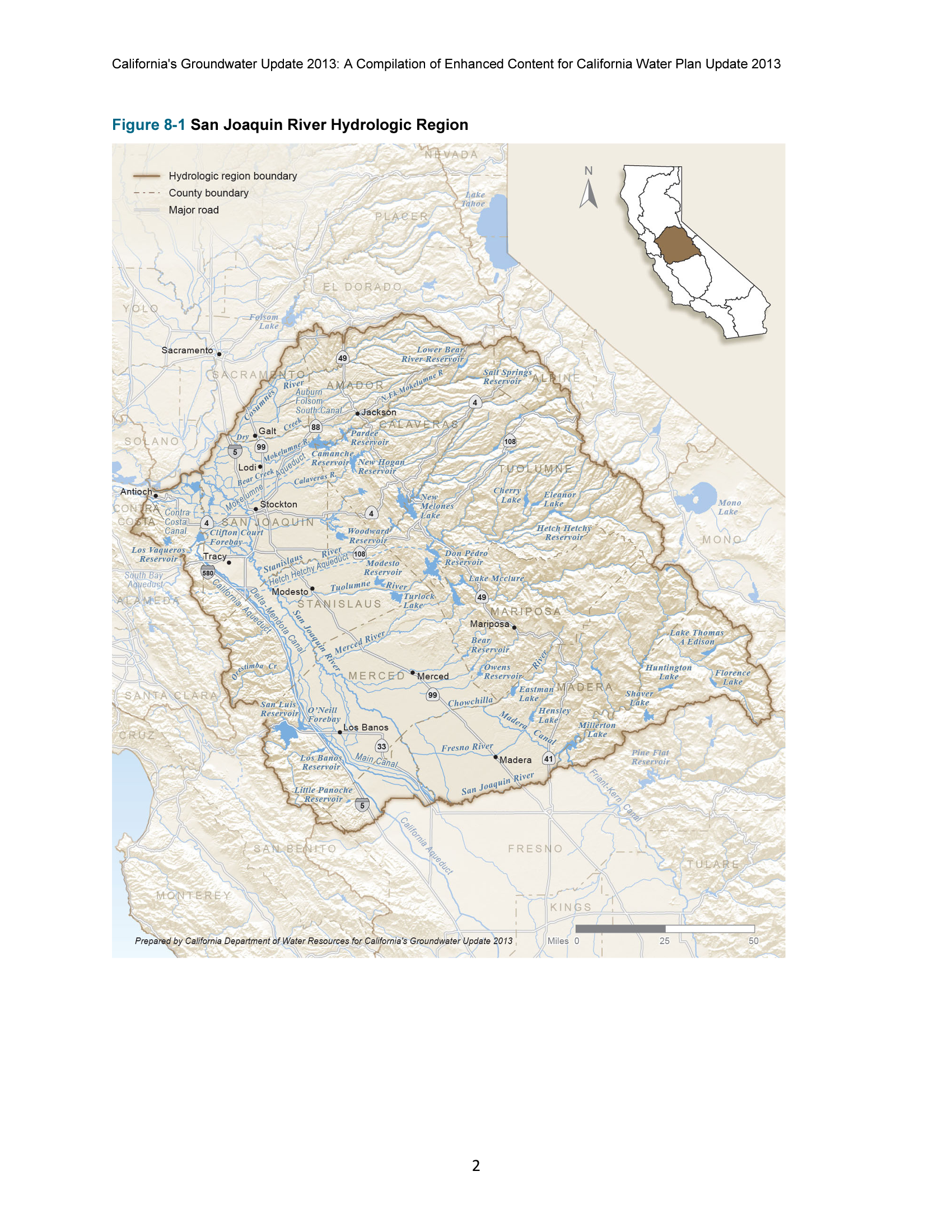
San Joaquin River hydrologic region

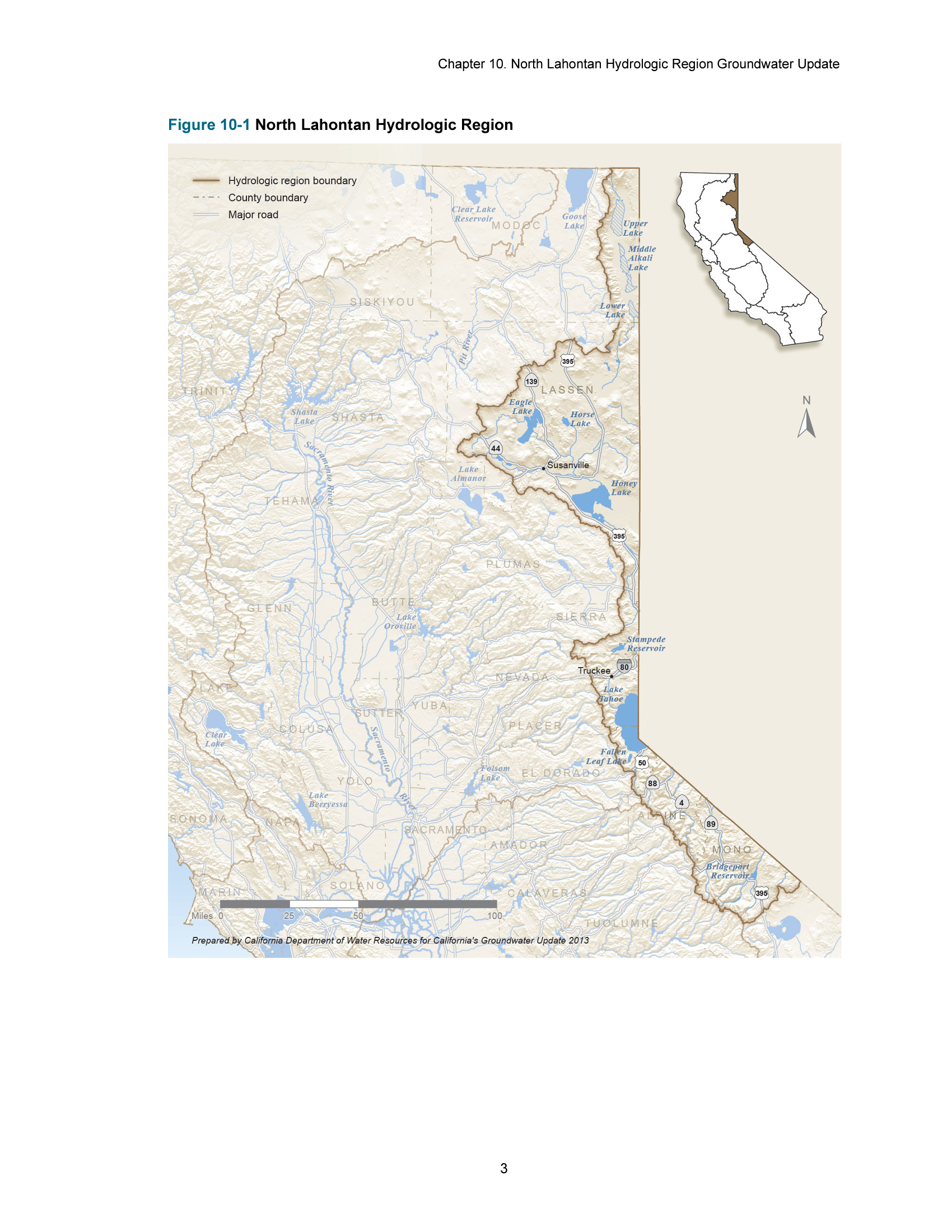
North Lahontan hydrologic region

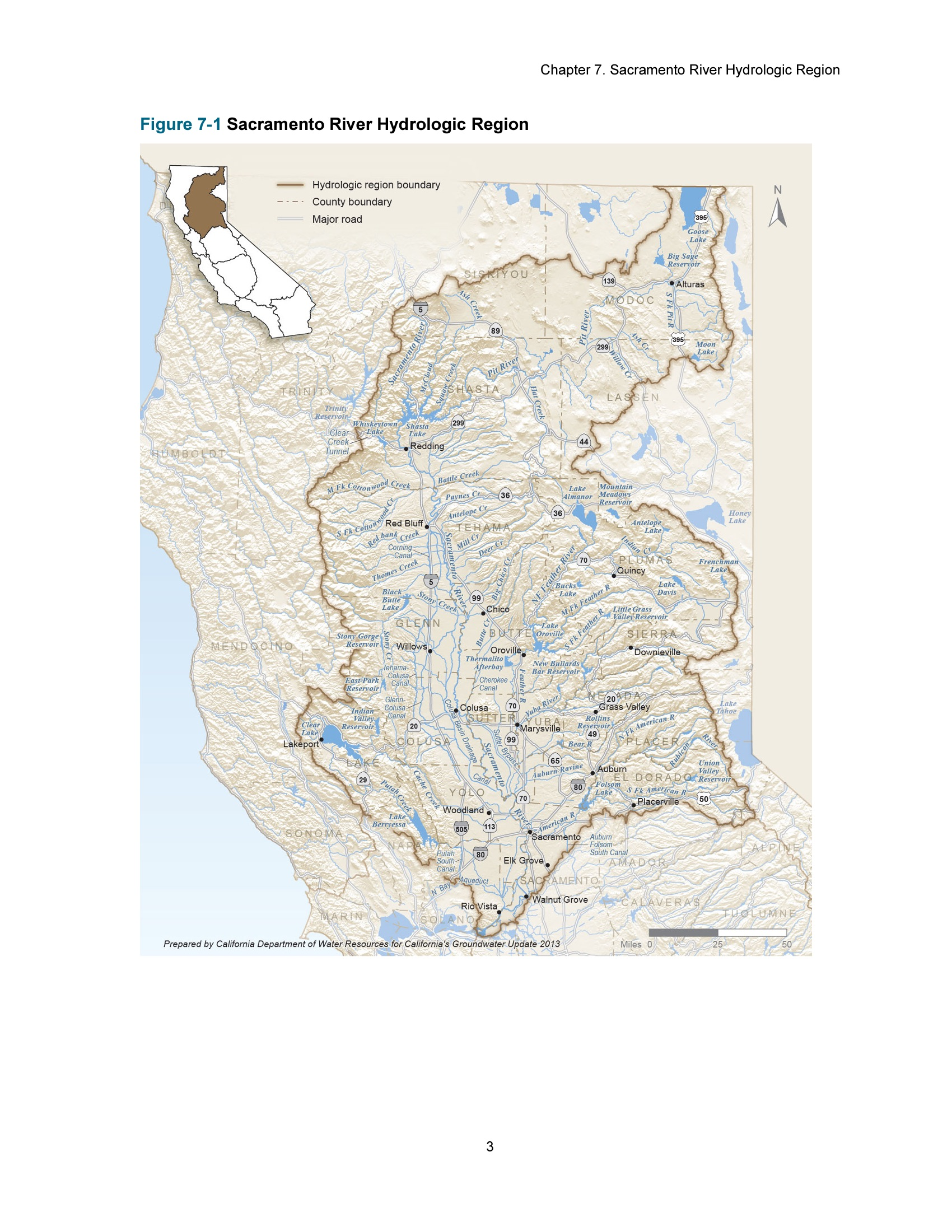
Sacramento River hydrologic region

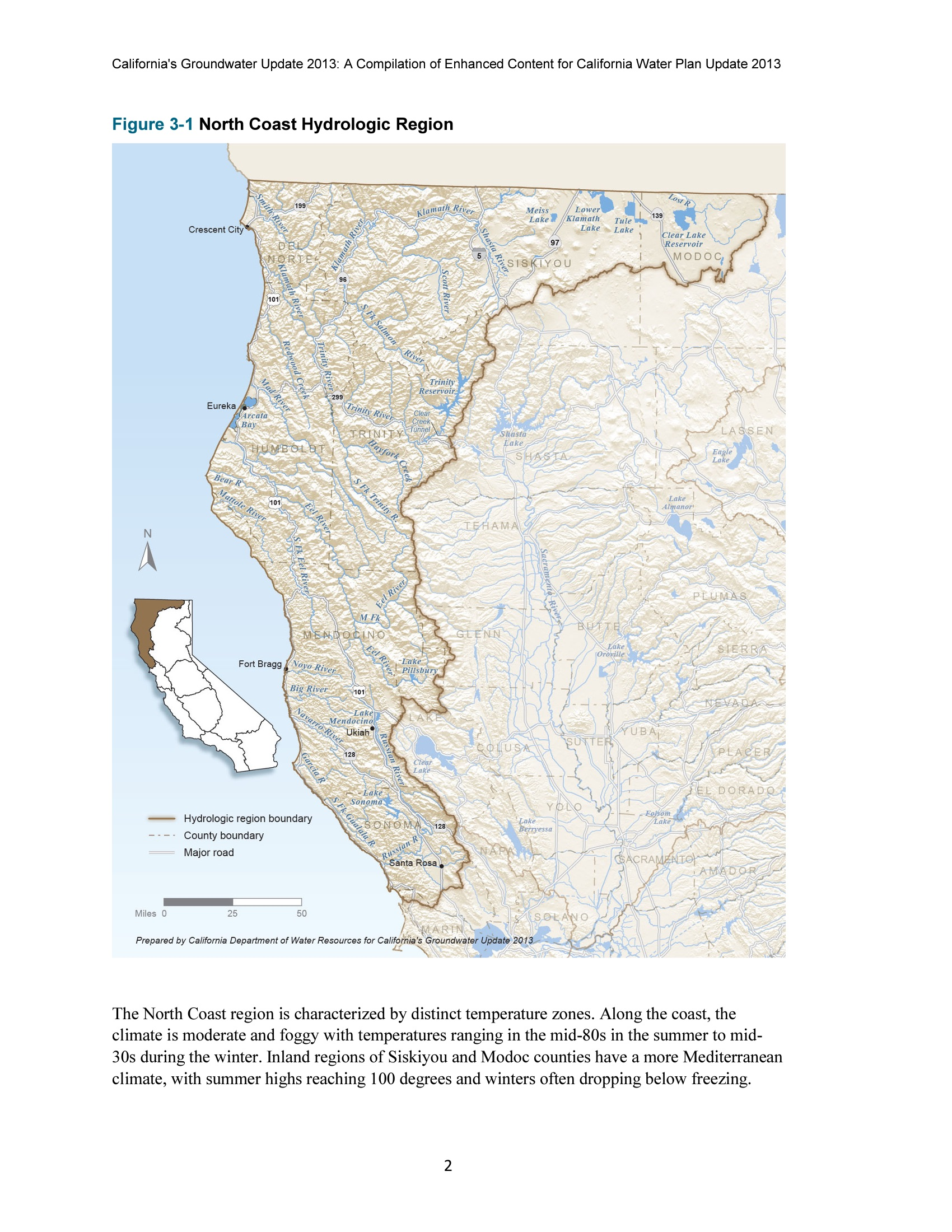
North Coast hydrologic region

== See also ==
- California water resource region
