= California water resource region =

US hydrologic region

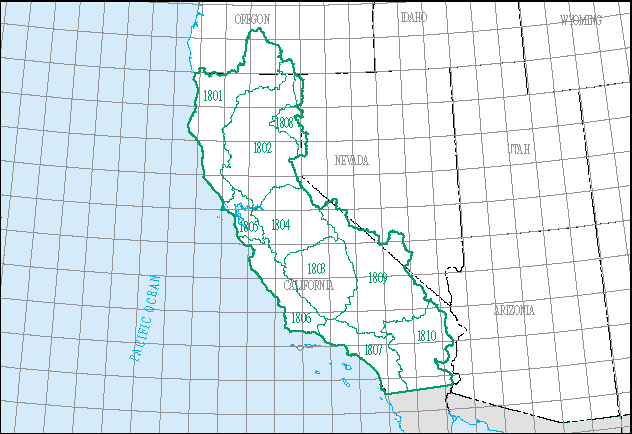
California region, with its 10 4-digit subregion hydrologic unit boundaries

The California water resource region is one of 21 major geographic areas, or regions, in the first level of classification used by the United States Geological Survey in the United States hydrologic unit system, which is used to divide and sub-divide the United States into successively smaller hydrologic units. These geographic areas contain either the drainage area of a major river, or the combined drainage areas of a series of rivers.

The California region, which is listed with a 2-digit hydrologic unit code (HUC) of 18, has an approximate size of 168,579 square miles (436,620 square kilometers), and consists of 10 subregions, which are listed with the 4-digit HUCs 1801 through 1810.

This region includes the drainage within the United States that ultimately discharges into the Pacific Ocean within the state of California; and those parts of the Great Basin (or other closed basins) that discharge into the state of California. Includes parts of California, Nevada, and Oregon.

== List of California water resource subregions ==
Subregion HUC	Subregion Name	Subregion Description	Subregion Location	Subregion Size	Subregion Map
1801	Klamath–Northern California Coastal subregion	The drainage into the Pacific Ocean from and including the Smith River Basin to and including the Stemple Creek Basin	California, Oregon	24,800 sq mi (64,000 km^{2})	HUC1801
1802	Sacramento subregion	The Sacramento River Basin and drainage into Goose Lake	California, Oregon	27,600 sq mi (71,000 km^{2})	HUC1802
1803	Tulare–Buena Vista Lakes subregion	The drainage into the Tulare and Buena Vista Lake closed basins	California	16,200 sq mi (42,000 km^{2})	HUC1803
1804	San Joaquin subregion	San Joaquin River Basin	California	15,600 sq mi (40,000 km^{2})	HUC1804
1805	San Francisco Bay subregion	The drainage into the Pacific Ocean from the Stemple Creek Basin boundary to and including the Pescadero Creek Basin, excluding the Sacramento and San Joaquin River Basins	California	4,470 sq mi (11,600 km^{2})	HUC1805
1806	Central California Coastal subregion	The drainage into the Pacific Ocean from the Pescadero Creek Basin boundary to and including the Rincon Creek Basin	California	11,400 sq mi (30,000 km^{2})	HUC1806
1807	Southern California Coastal subregion	Drainage within the United States that discharges into the Pacific Ocean from the Rincon Creek Basin boundary to the California-Baja California international boundary	California	11,100 sq mi (29,000 km^{2})	HUC1807
1808	North Lahontan subregion	The drainage east of the Sierra Nevada and north of the Truckee River Basin, which includes the Lahonton closed basins that discharge into California	California, Nevada	4,480 sq mi (11,600 km^{2})	HUC1808
1809	Northern Mojave–Mono Lake subregion	The Closed Desert Basins that discharge into South Central California, including Mono Lake, Owens Lake, Death Valley, and the Upper Mojave Desert	California, Nevada	28,000 sq mi (73,000 km^{2})	HUC1809
1810	Southern Mojave–Salton Sea subregion	The closed desert basins in southeastern California, including the Lower Mojave Desert and the Salton Sea	California	16,000 sq mi (41,000 km^{2})	HUC1810

== Additional images ==
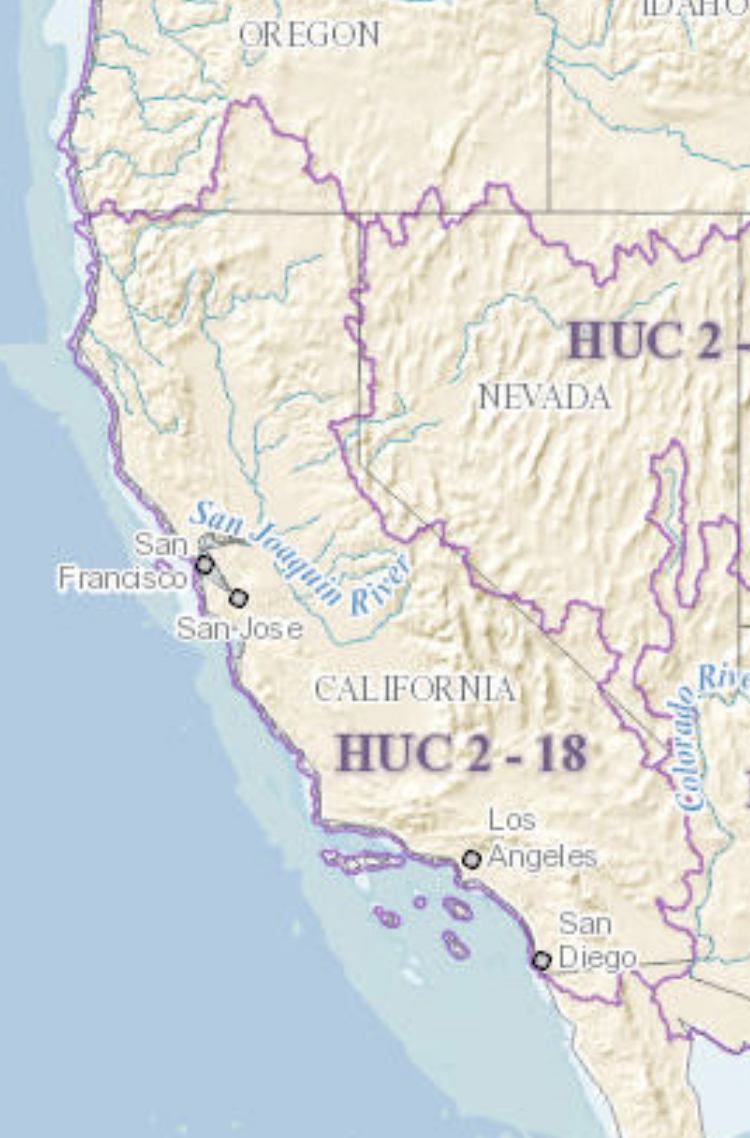
Region (2-digit code)

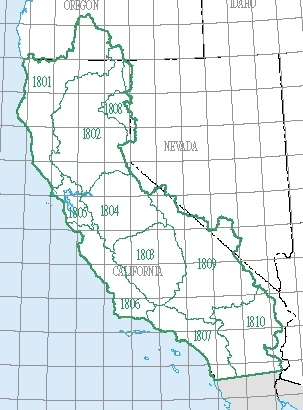
Subregions (4-digit codes)

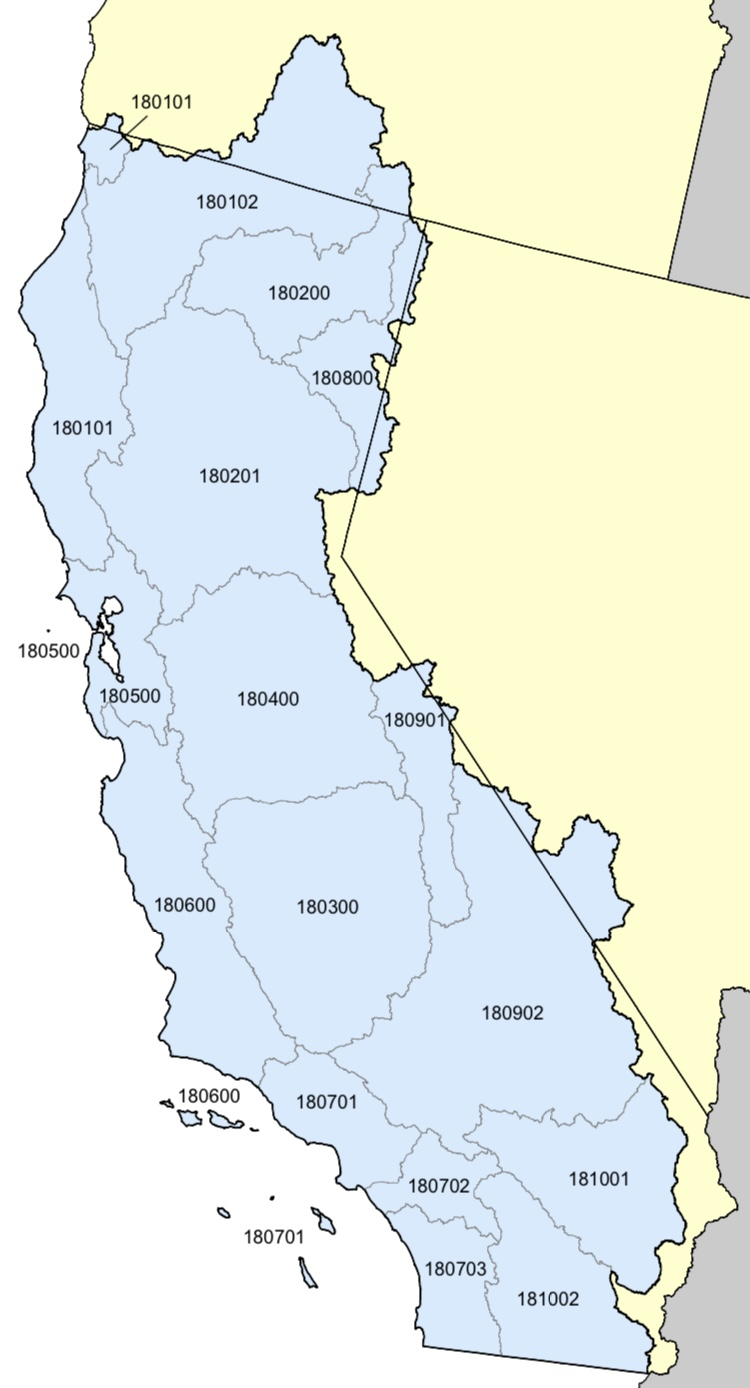
Basins (6-digit codes)

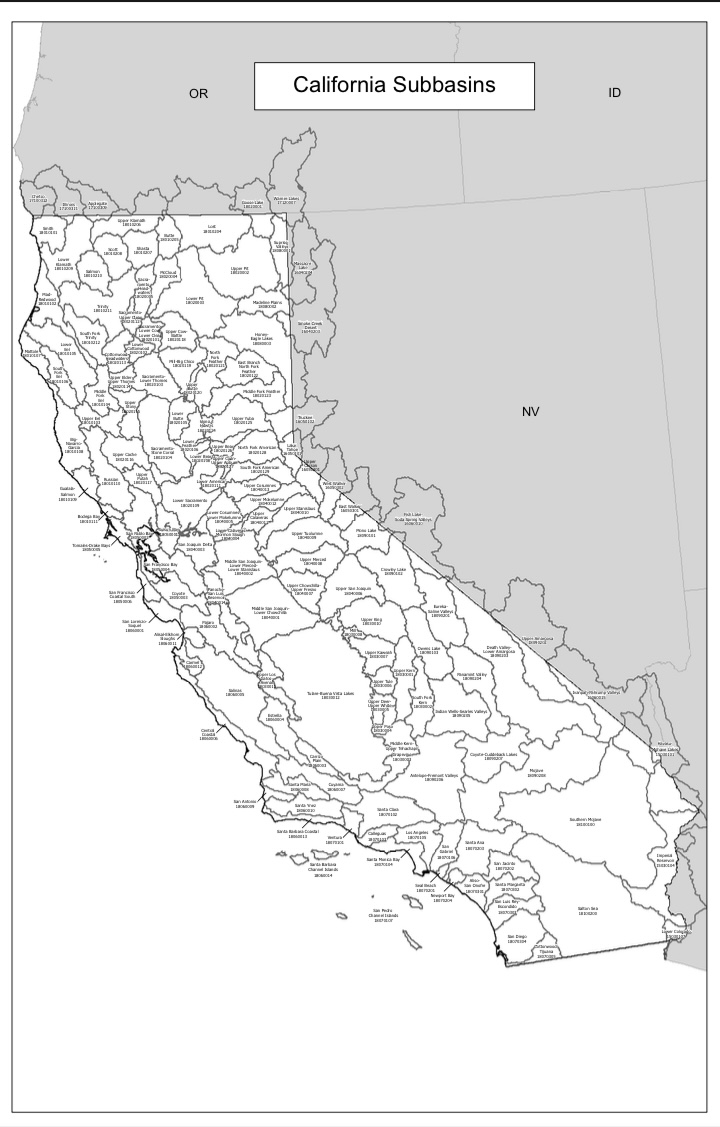
Subbasins (8-digit codes)

== See also ==
- List of California hydrologic regions
- List of rivers in the United States
- Groundwater recharge
- Water in California
- Principal aquifers of California
- California State Water Resources Control Board § Regional Water Quality Control Boards
