= South Lahontan hydrologic region =

Regional subdivision, CA Dept of Water Resources

Coordinates: 36.2°N 117.0°W

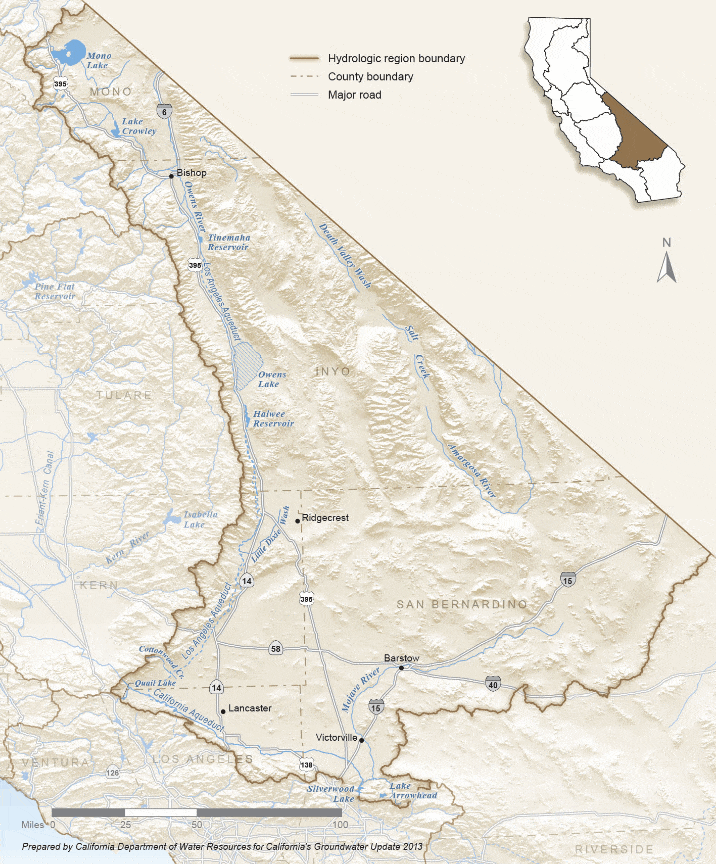
Map of the South Lahontan hydrologic region

The South Lahonton is a hydrologic region defined by the State of California that encompasses several interior basins east of the Sierra Nevada and the Transverse Ranges, with an area of 17 million acres (69,000 km^{2}). It covers the western portion of the Mojave Desert and a southwestern portion of the Great Basin desert, and extends into the forests of the southeastern Sierra Nevada and the montane chaparral and woodlands of the northeastern Transverse ranges. The ecoregion has an arid to semi-arid climate, with average annual rainfall of 7.9 inches (200 mm).

The region is closed or endorheic, and none of its rivers or streams reach the sea. They instead empty into lake beds from which the water evaporates, leaving deposits of salts and other minerals. There are some year-round mountain streams and springs, but most of the large rivers are intermittent, and the lakes vary in extent based on variations in rainfall and runoff.

Perennial streams include the Owens River and tributaries to Mono Lake, such as Rush Creek and Lee Vining Creek. Drainage basins include the Antelope Valley watershed, the Mojave watershed, Mono Basin, the Owens River watershed, and the Amargosa River watershed.

There are 77 state-recognized alluvial groundwater basins and subbasins in the South Lahontan hydrologic region, underlying approximately 55 percent of the land area.

== See also ==
- Northern Mojave–Mono Lake subregion
- List of California hydrologic regions
