= Ventura–San Gabriel Coastal water resource basin =

Third-level USGS hydrologic unit system subdivision

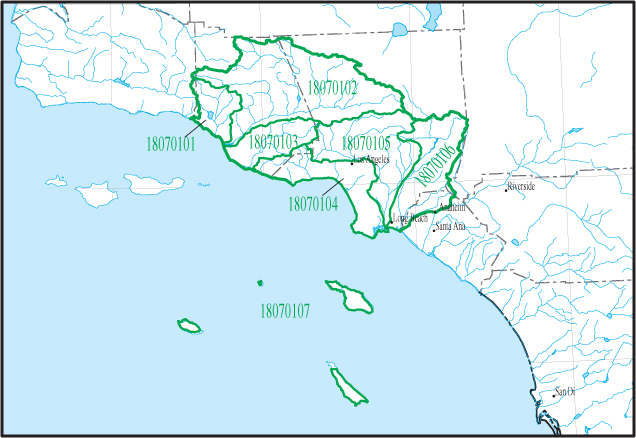
Ventura-San Gabriel coastal basin has seven water resource subbasins

Ventura–San Gabriel Coastal water resource basin (HUC 180701) is one of three hydrologic basins within the Southern California Coastal water resource subregion and is one of approximately 2,200 water resource basins in the United States hydrologic unit system. The Ventura–San Gabriel Coastal water resource basin is a third-level subdivision of the United States hydrologic unit system.

The Ventura–San Gabriel Coastal basin is approximately 4,530 sq mi (11,700 km^{2}; 2,900,000-acre) and extends from Rincon Creek on the north to the San Gabriel Basin on the south. The Ventura–San Gabriel Coastal basin is composed of seven fourth-level hydrological units called water resource subbasins (formerly known as water resource cataloging units), each with its own 8-digit hydrologic unit code. Water in this basin is overseen by the Greater Los Angeles County Integrated Water Management Region, the Upper Santa Clara Integrated Water Management Region, and the Ventura County Watershed Protection District. This basin was part of an educational initiative by the University of California called Watershed U; modules focused on the Los Angeles River, Ventura River, Santa Clara River, and Compton Creek. The Los Angeles County Department of Public Works subdivides the water sectors of their county six ways, slightly differently from the federal subdivisions; they oversee the heavily channelized watercourses of the county in partnership with the U.S. Army Corps of Engineers.

== List of subbasins of the Ventura-San Gabriel coastal basin ==
| Basin HUC | Basin name | Basin description | Basin location | Basin size | Basin map |
|---|---|---|---|---|---|
| 18070101 | Ventura subbasin | Ventura River, Lake Casitas | Ventura County | 335 sq mi (870 km^{2}) | USGS hydrologic unit 18070101 boundary map |
| 18070102 | Santa Clara subbasin | Santa Clara River is major feature; "encompasses majority of Los Angeles County and Ventura County, as well as cities of Fillmore, San Buenaventura, Santa Clarita, and Santa Paula" | Ventura County, Los Angeles County | 1,626 sq mi (4,210 km^{2}) | USGS hydrologic unit 18070101 boundary map |
| 18070103 | Calleguas subbasin | Calleguas Creek, Arroyo Conejo, Mugu Lagoon | Ventura County, Los Angeles County | 438 sq mi (1,130 km^{2}) | USGS hydrologic unit 18070103 boundary map |
| 18070104 | Santa Monica Bay subbasin | Malibu Creek, Ballona Creek, Dominguez Channel, "mostly highly urbanized areas; major communities include the cities of Agoura Hills, Calabasas, Culver City, Inglewood, Los Angeles, Malibu, Santa Monica, and West Hollywood" | Los Angeles County | 673 sq mi (1,740 km^{2}) | USGS hydrologic unit 18070104 boundary map |
| 18070105 | Los Angeles subbasin | Los Angeles River is major feature; "majority of the upper portion is covered by forest and open space. Cities of Long Beach and Los Angeles are highly developed with residential and urban use" | Los Angeles County | 831 sq mi (2,150 km^{2}) | USGS hydrologic unit 18070105 boundary map |
| 18070106 | San Gabriel subbasin | San Gabriel River is major feature; "majority of areas are not developed. It runs through Angeles National Forest and cities of Covina, Long Beach, Los Angeles, Pomona, and Whittier" | Los Angeles County, Orange County, California | 906 sq mi (2,350 km^{2}) | USGS hydrologic unit 18070106 boundary map |
| 18070107 | San Pedro Channel Islands subbasin | Southern Channel Islands: San Clemente, San Nicolas, Santa Barbara, Catalina | Los Angeles County | 797 sq mi (2,060 km^{2}) | USGS hydrologic unit 18070107 boundary map |

== See also ==
- South Coast hydrologic region
- Groundwater recharge
- Water in California
- Principal aquifers of California
