= Rincon Point =

Rincon Point may mean:

Places in:

== California ==
- Rincon Point (San Francisco) 34°22′23″N 119°28′42″W
- Rincon Point (Santa Barbara County) part of the Rincon (surfspot) 34°22′23″N 119°28′42″W

== Texas ==
- Rincon Point (Texas) 27°50′09″N 097°22′45″W
