= Southern California Coastal water resource subregion =

Second-level USGS hydrologic unit system subdivision

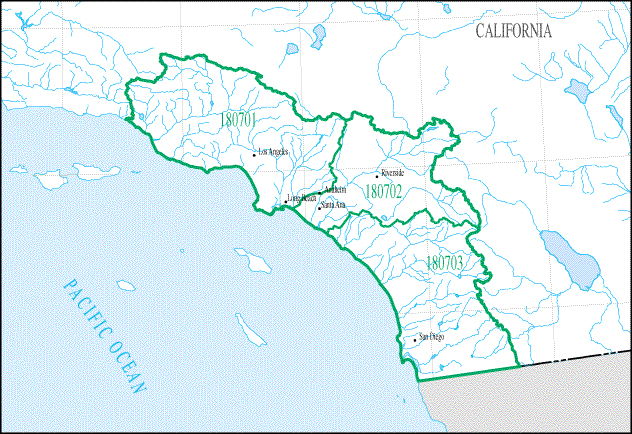
Water resource basins of the Southern California coastal subregion (HUC 1807)

Southern California Coastal water resource subregion (HUC 1807) is one of 10 hydrologic subregions within the California water resource region and is one of 222 water resource subregions in the United States hydrologic unit system. The Southern California coastal subregion, sometimes called the South Coast Hydrologic Subregion, is a second-level subdivision covering is approximately 11,000 sq mi (28,000 km^{2}; 7,000,000-acre) and extends from Rincon Creek on the north to the international border with Mexico on the south. The South Coast Hydrologic Subregion is composed of three third-level hydrological units. The federally defined Southern California Coastal water resource subregion equates roughly with the state-designated South Coast hydrologic region. Per a USGS report of 1976, "Water deficiency is prevalent in the South Coastal subregion." By 1955 the region was found to be experiencing measurable levels of saltwater intrusion due to overdrawn aquifers and several wells were abandoned as a consequence. Part of the solution was injecting Colorado River water from the aqueduct into local wells to defend against the salted water, a practice called artificial recharge.

== List of Southern California Coastal subregion basins ==
Basin HUC	Basin name	Basin description	Basin location	Basin size	Basin map
180701	Ventura–San Gabriel Coastal water resource basin	The drainage into the Pacific Ocean from the Rincon Creek Basin boundary to and including the San Gabriel River Basin.	Ventura County, Los Angeles County	4,530 sq mi (11,700 km^{2})	HUC180201
180702	Santa Ana water resource basin	The drainage into the Pacific Ocean from the San Gabriel River Basin boundary to the Moro Canyon drainage boundary near Laguna Beach, California.	Los Angeles County, Orange County	2,680 sq mi (6,900 km^{2})	HUC180202
180703	Laguna–San Diego Coastal water resource basin	The drainage within the United States that discharges into the Pacific Ocean from and including the Moro Canyon drainage basin near Laguna Beach to the California–Baja California international boundary	Orange County, San Diego County	3,860 sq mi (10,000 km^{2})	HUC180203

== See also ==
- Groundwater recharge
- Water in California
- Principal aquifers of California
