= Santa Ana water resource basin =

Third-level USGS hydrologic unit system subdivision

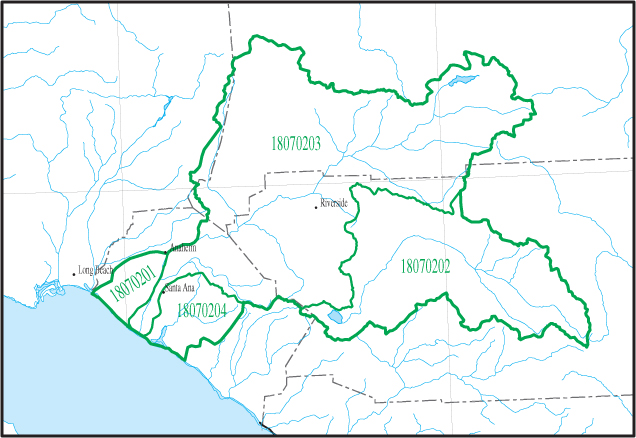
Santa Ana water resource basin has four water resource subbasins

Santa Ana water resource basin (HUC 180702) is one of three hydrologic basins within the Southern California Coastal water resource subregion and is one of approximately 2,200 water resource basins in the United States hydrologic unit system. The Santa Ana water resource basin is a third-level subdivision of the United States hydrologic unit system.

The Santa Ana basin is approximately 2,680 sq mi (6,900 km^{2}; 1,720,000-acre) and includes the drainage into the Pacific Ocean from the San Gabriel boundary to the Moro Canyon drainage boundary near Laguna Beach. The Santa Ana basin is composed of four fourth-level hydrological units called water resource subbasins (formerly known as water resource cataloging units), each with its own 8-digit hydrologic unit code. The Santa Ana water resource basin is home to approximately 6 million people. The Santa Ana Integrated Regional Water Management Region and Santa Ana Watershed Project Authority oversee water systems in the basin. The most significant water feature is the basin is the Santa Ana River. Secondary features include Lake Perris and Lake Elsinore.

== List of subbasins of the Santa Ana basin ==
Basin HUC	Basin name	Basin description	Basin location	Basin size	Basin map
18070201	Seal Beach subbasin	Also known as the Anaheim Bay–Huntington Harbor watershed; includes municipality drainages from Anaheim, Cypress, Fountain Valley, Garden Grove, Huntington Beach, Los Alamitos, Santa Ana, Seal Beach, Stanton, and Westminster; drains into Bolsa Chica Ecological Reserve and Seal Beach National Wildlife Refuge	Orange County	90 sq mi (230 km^{2})	USGS hydrologic unit 18070201 boundary map
18070202	San Jacinto subbasin	San Jacinto River, Mystic Lake, Perris Reservoir, Lake Hemet	Riverside County	757 sq mi (1,960 km^{2})	USGS hydrologic unit 18070202 boundary map
18070203	Santa Ana subbasin	Santa Ana River; largest river basin in SoCal	Orange County, Riverside County, San Bernardino County	1,680 sq mi (4,400 km^{2})	USGS hydrologic unit 18070203 boundary map
18070204	Newport Bay subbasin	Major watercourses are San Diego Creek and Santa Ana Delhi Channel; also known as the Central Orange County watershed; drains municipalities of Irvine, Newport Beach, Tustin, and partial drainage of Costa Mesa, Laguna Hills, Lake Forest, Orange, and Santa Ana	Orange County	154 sq mi (400 km^{2})	USGS hydrologic unit 18070204 boundary map

== See also ==
- South Coast hydrologic region
- Groundwater recharge
- Water in California
- Principal aquifers of California
