= Laguna–San Diego Coastal water resource basin =

Third-level USGS hydrologic unit system subdivision

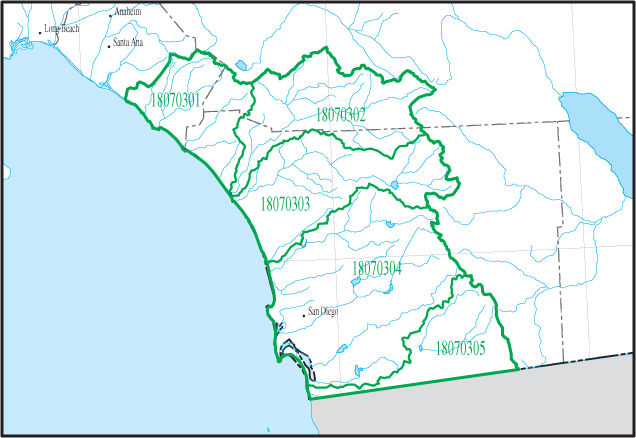
Laguna–San Diego Coastal water resource basin has five water resource subbasins

Laguna–San Diego Coastal water resource basin (HUC 180703) is one of three hydrologic basins within the Southern California Coastal water resource subregion and is one of approximately 2,200 water resource basins in the United States hydrologic unit system.

The Laguna–San Diego Coastal water resource basin is a third-level subdivision of the United States hydrologic unit system. The tiers of the classification system, in order from largest to smallest, are regions, subregions, basins (formerly accounting units), subbasins (formerly cataloging units), watersheds, and subwatersheds. These geographic areas contain either the drainage area of a major river, or the combined drainage areas of a group of rivers.

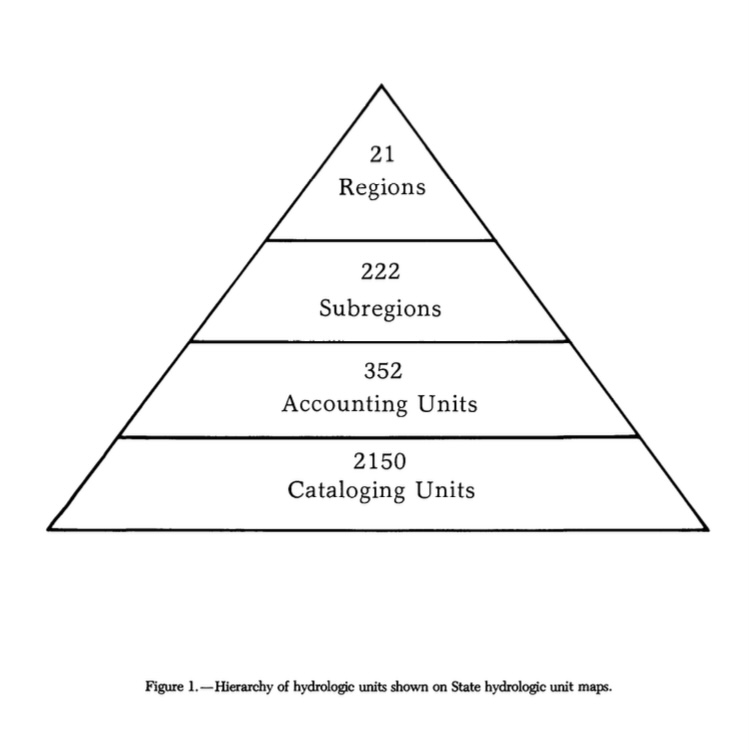
Hierarchy of United States hydrological units c. 1984

The Laguna–San Diego Coastal basin is approximately 3,860 sq mi (10,000 km^{2}; 2,470,000-acre) and includes the drainage into the Pacific Ocean from Moro Canyon near Laguna Beach to the international border between the United States and Mexico. The Laguna–San Diego Coastal basin is composed of five fourth-level hydrological units called water resource subbasins (formerly known as water resource cataloging units), each with its own 8-digit hydrologic unit code.

== List of subbasins of the Laguna–San Diego Coastal basin ==
Basin HUC	Basin name	Basin description	Basin location	Basin size	Basin map
18070301	Aliso–San Onofre subbasin	San Juan Creek, Aliso Creek, Laguna Beach coastal streams, Dana Point coastal streams, San Clemente coastal streams	Orange County	498 sq mi (1,290 km^{2})	USGS hydrologic unit 18070301 boundary map
18070302	Santa Margarita subbasin	Santa Margarita River, drains Fallbrook and Marine Corps Base Camp Pendleton	San Diego County, Riverside	731 sq mi (1,890 km^{2})	USGS hydrologic unit 18070302 boundary map
18070303	San Luis Rey–Escondido subbasin	Sometimes called the San Luis–Carlsbad Watershed; includes San Luis Rey River, Escondido Creek, Buena Vista Lagoon, Agua Hedionda Lagoon, Batiquitos Lagoon, San Elijo Lagoon, Loma Alta Creek and the associated slough	San Diego County	766 sq mi (1,980 km^{2})	USGS hydrologic unit 18070303 boundary map
18070304	San Diego subbasin	San Dieguito Creek, Peñasquitos Creek, San Diego River, Pueblo Watershed coastal streams including Chollas Creek, Sweetwater River and reservoirs, Otay River	San Diego County	1,390 sq mi (3,600 km^{2})	USGS hydrologic unit 18070304 boundary map
18070305	Cottonwood–Tijuana subbasin	Tijuana River (international watershed, subbasin boundary is at the border)	San Diego County	477 sq mi (1,240 km^{2})	USGS hydrologic unit 18070305 boundary map

== See also ==
- South Coast hydrologic region
- Groundwater recharge
- Water in California
- Principal aquifers of California
