= Graciosa (disambiguation) =

Graciosa is an island of the Azores, Portugal.

Graciosa or La Graciosa may also refer to:

- Graciosa, Canary Islands, Spain, also known as La Graciosa
- Graciosa IPR, a wine region of the island of Graciosa, Azores
- Graciosa fortress, Tanger-Tetouan-Al Hoceima, Morocco
- Graciosa State Park, Paraná, Brazil
- Doña Blanca, a white Spanish and Portuguese grape variety also known as Graciosa
- La Graciosa (song), 2026 song by Quevedo and Elvis Crespo
- La Graciosa, California, a former settlement in Santa Barbara County, California, US
- La graciosa thistle, a species of thistle endemic to California, US
- "Graciosa", a 1999 song by Moby, which was featured in Any Given Sunday

== See also ==
- Gracioso, a character in Spanish classical theatre
