= Elk thistle =

Elk thistle is a common name for several plants and may refer to:

- Cirsium foliosum
- Cirsium scariosum, native to western North America
