= Rincon (surfspot) =

Beach in California, United States

Coordinates: 34°22′41″N 119°28′55″W

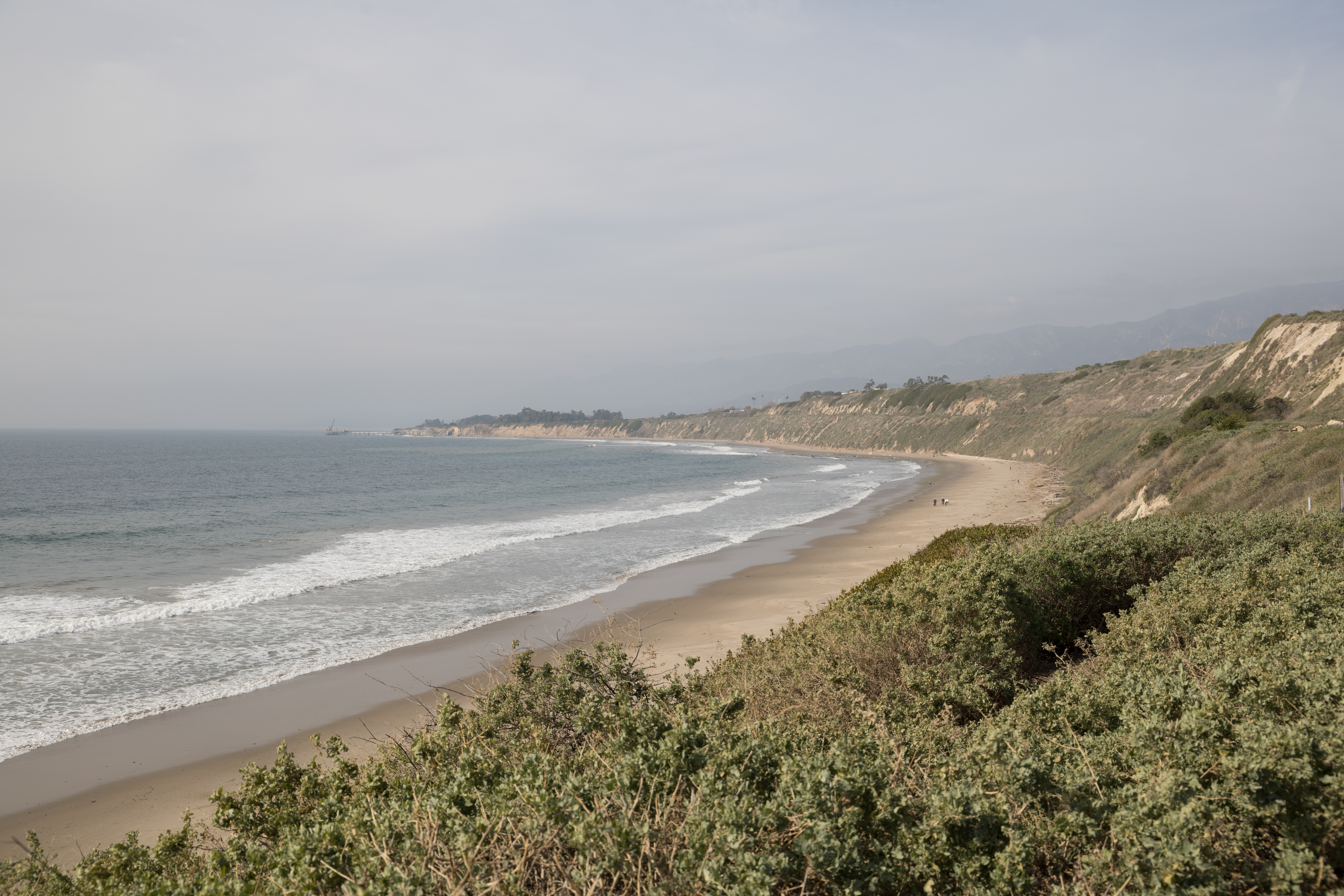
Rincon Beach County Park, Carpinteria, California

Rincon (Spanish, "angle" or "corner") is a surf spot located at the Ventura and Santa Barbara County line in Southern California, United States. Also known as the "Queen of the Coast", Rincon is one of the most famous surf spots in California, known around the world for its well-formed waves and long rides. The book 100 Best Surf Spots in the World rates Rincon at 24. It is best at low tide during the winter months when swells are coming mostly from the west and northwest. There is a gated residential community that occupies most of the Rincon beachfront. Public access is provided at parking lots on both sides of the gated community, with restrooms and a picnic area in the upper parking lot, Rincon Beach Park.

Rincon Point is home to the Rincon Classic surf championship scheduled for January each year. The championship draws local surf greats and spectators to the beach every year. Though scheduled for January, the event is often delayed until surf conditions merit a contest. Once these surf conditions are met the contest is held from Saturday through Sunday. There are multiple divisions ranging from the Legends (55+) to the gremlins (U12). There are nine divisions for the men, including the pro division, while there are 2 divisions for the women. The pro division mainly consists of local professional surfers including world surf league competitor Conner Coffin who competes in the contest almost every year. The contest is open to the public and local residents receive priority registration based on their county . During the contest local restaurants provide lunch for the competitors and also sell food to the public. These restaurants include Nutbelly and Rincon Brewery.

== Geography and ecology ==
Rincon is located along U.S. Route 101 at Bates Road. It is divided into three parts: the Cove, Rivermouth, and Indicator. The cove is the best part of the point and is the closest to the freeway. Rivermouth is the fastest section of the wave reaching from the mouth of Rincon Creek to the large white/stone house. Tube rides occur mainly at Rivermouth at low tide. Indicator is at the top of the point, visually obstructed from the freeway. While Rincon is most famous for its long right-breaking waves, Indicator also produces some extremely fast left-breaking waves during the summer, when southerly swells are most prevalent. During a larger westerly swell, all three sections often connect into one contiguous ridable wave.

Because of the quality of the wave, people travel from all over the world to surf there, sometimes resulting in extremely crowded surfing conditions. There have been occasional deaths at Rincon, mostly resulting from surfers getting caught at the bottom of the cove at higher tides during larger swells and getting thrown into the granite boulders which support the nearby freeway.

Environmentally, Rincon Creek has a tendency to flow higher levels of bacteria into the surf zone during heavy rains, resulting in occasional beach closures.

== History ==
In 1769, the Spanish Portola expedition came west along the beach from the previous night's encampment at Pitas Point. The explorers found a large native village at a watering place near the mouth what is now called "Rincon Creek", and camped nearby on August 16. Fray Juan Crespi, a Franciscan missionary travelling with the expedition, noted that "As soon as we arrived all the people came to visit us, and brought us a great supply of roasted fish to eat" The 1775 (second) expedition led by Juan Bautista de Anza camped at the same place, referring to the native village as "La Rinconada".

In 1835, the area was included in a 4,460-acre (18.0 km^{2}) land grant called Rancho El Rincon. The grant extended along the coast on both sides of the Santa Barbara/Ventura county line, and encompassed present-day Rincon Point, Rincon State Beach and La Conchita.

== See also ==
- Juan Bautista de Anza National Historic Trail
