= La Graciosa, California =

Santa Barbara County settlement (~1868–1877)

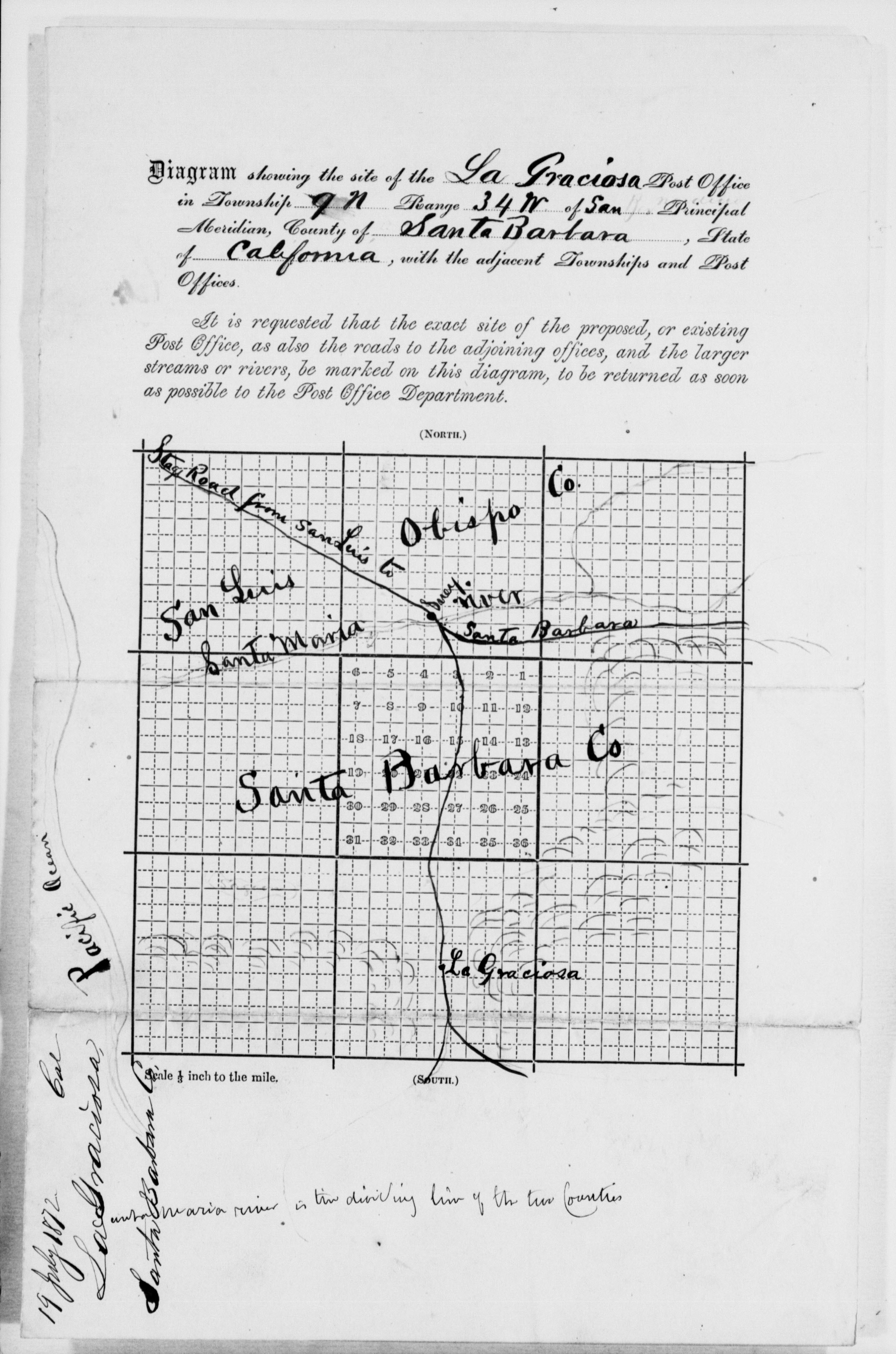
La Graciosa location map submitted to the U.S. Post Office Department in the 1870s

La Graciosa is a former human settlement in Santa Barbara County, California, United States. La Graciosa was the first village established in the Santa Maria River valley. It was located southwest of Orcutt. The town was named for Laguna Graciosa, a nearby lagoon so called because Spanish explorers thought it was lovely. The town was on land that had been Rancho Guadalupe. A man named Patrick O'Neil opened a stage station and store on the site around 1868. The stagecoach route had originally gone through Foxen Canyon but eventually switched to the valley of Los Alamos, with a stop at La Graciosa. The settlement had a post office and a school. However, in 1877 H. M. Newhall came into possession of the land and "served suits of ejectment to all the inhabitants."

La Graciosa schools had 52 students in approximately 1882.

== See also ==
- La Graciosa thistle
- History of Santa Maria, California
