= Rancho Punta de Laguna =

Land grant in California

Coordinates: 34.910°N 120.490°W

Rancho Punta de Laguna was a 26,648-acre (107.84 km^{2}) Mexican land grant in present day northern Santa Barbara County, California, and southern San Luis Obispo County given in 1844 by Governor Manuel Micheltorena to Luis Arellanes and Emigdio Miguel Ortega. The name of this rancho means "point of the lagoon" and refers to the irregular lake lying within its territory. The grant is east of Rancho Guadalupe and encompasses present day Santa Maria and Betteravia.

== History ==
Luis Arellanes and Emigdio Miguel Ortega were granted the six square league Rancho Punta de Laguna in 1844. Emigdio Miguel Ortega (1813–1893), son of Juan Capistrano Martin Ortega (1776–1818) and Maria Rafela Arellanes (1790-), married Maria Concepcion Jacinta Dominguez (1817–) in 1836.

With the cession of California to the United States following the Mexican-American War, the 1848 Treaty of Guadalupe Hidalgo provided that the land grants would be honored. As required by the Land Act of 1851, a claim for Rancho Punta de Laguna was filed with the Public Land Commission in 1852, and the grant was patented to Luis Arellanes and Emigdio Miguel Ortega in 1873.

Rancho Punta de Laguna shared a common border Rancho Guadalupe, but a combination of vague definition and government errors produced three different surveys and two patents and lengthy litigation. A third survey pushed the boundary with Rancho Punta de Laguna east. However, the boundary of Rancho Punta de Laguna, was fixed by its patented in 1873. After seven more years of litigation, in 1880 the US confirmed the owners of Rancho Guadalupe, leaving the owners of Rancho Punta de Laguna short. The Rancho Punta de Laguna owners then turned to the U.S. Congress. In 1890, Congress gave the Rancho Punta de Laguna owners rights to unoccupied California land equal to what they had lost.

== See also ==
- Ranchos of California
- List of Ranchos of California
