= Rancho El Rincon (Arellanes) =

Mexican land grant in Santa Barbara and Ventura Counties, California

Coordinates: 34.390°N 119.460°W

Rancho El Rincon was a 4,460-acre (18.0 km^{2}) Mexican land grant in present day Santa Barbara County and Ventura County, California given in 1835 by Governor José Figueroa to Teodoro Arellanes. "Rincon" means "corner" in Spanish. The grant extended along the Pacific coast at the Santa Barbara and Ventura County line and encompassed Rincon Point, Rincon State Beach and present day La Conchita.

== History ==
José Teodoro Arellanes (1782-1858) was a soldier at the Presidio of Santa Barbara when he was married to María Sirilda Procopia Ruiz in 1802. After she died, he married the widow Maria Josefa Rodriguez (1786-1851) in 1812. Teodoro Arellanes was granted the one square league Rancho El Rincon in 1835, and Rancho Guadalupe in 1840.

With the cession of California to the United States following the Mexican-American War, the 1848 Treaty of Guadalupe Hidalgo provided that the land grants would be honored. As required by the Land Act of 1851, a claim for Rancho El Rincon was filed with the Public Land Commission in 1852, and the grant was patented to Teodoro Arellanes in 1872.

In 1855, Arellanes gave the rancho to his son-in-law Dr. Matthew H. Biggs, who married daughter Maria de Jesus Arellanes in 1853. In 1882 Biggs sold the rancho to Benigno Gutierrez (-1902), his former business partner, and Dr. Charles B. Bates.

== See also ==
- Ranchos of California
- List of Ranchos of California
