= Betteravia, California =

Historic community in California, US

Coordinates: 34°55′04″N 120°30′54″W

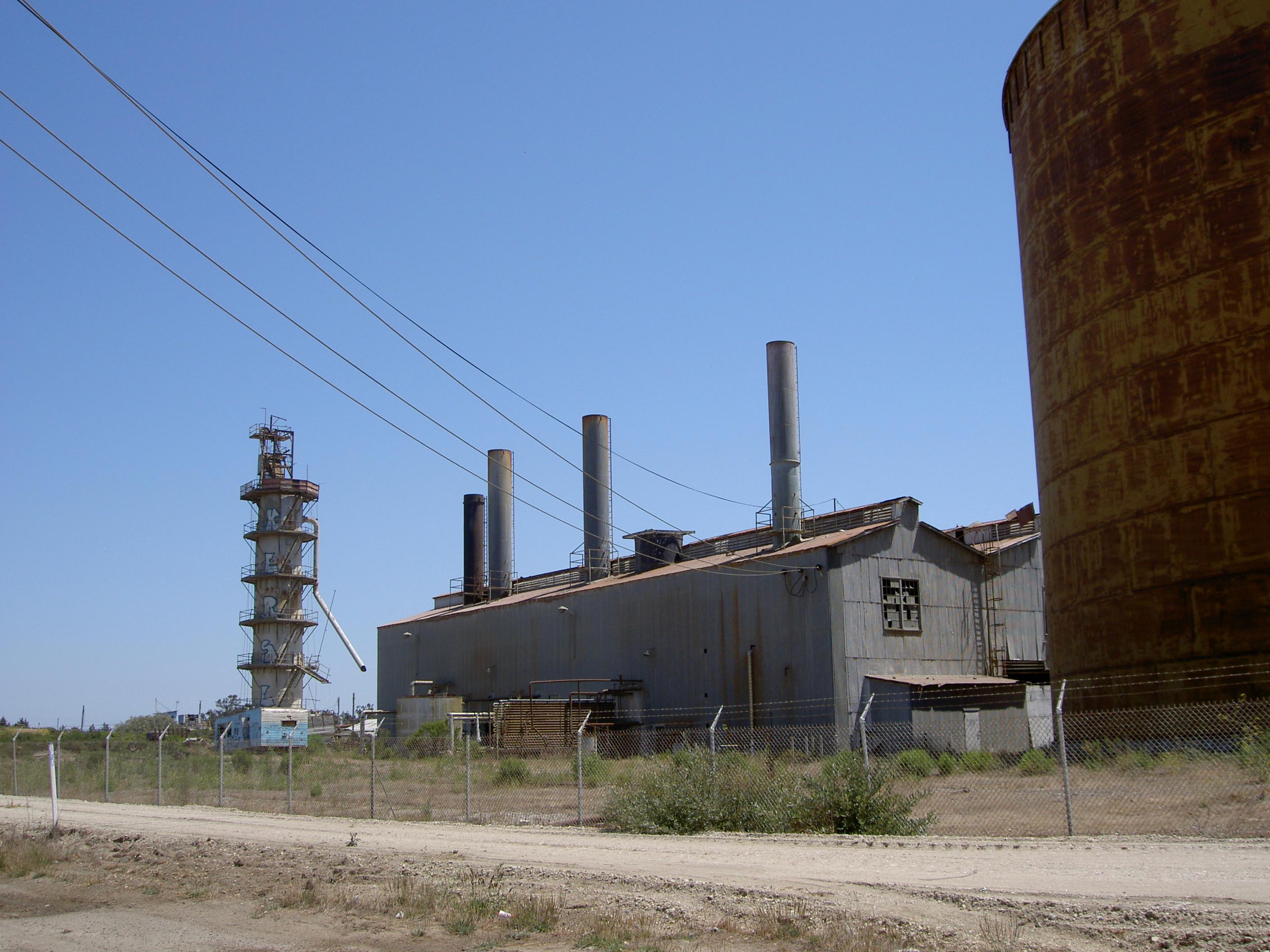
Former sugar refinery buildings in Betteravia in 2009

Betteravia (from French betterave "sugar beet roots") was a community in northern Santa Barbara County, California, United States on Betteravia Road, six miles west of Santa Maria.

== History ==
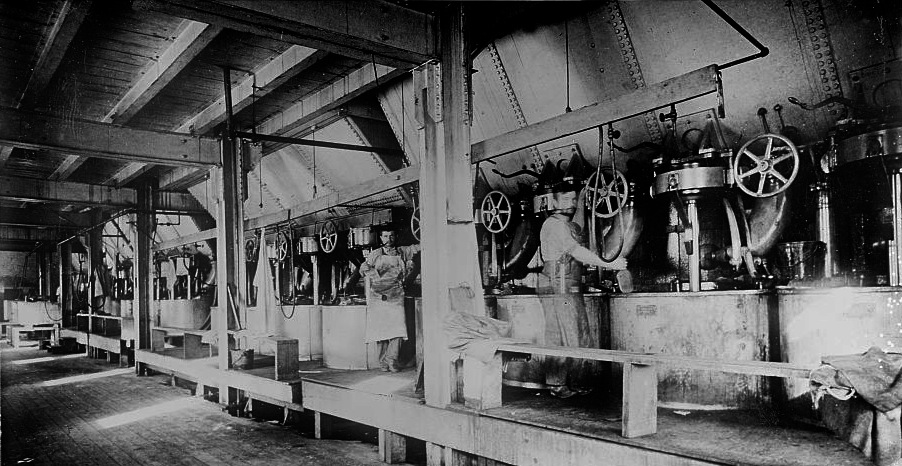
Inside the Union Sugar factory between 1910 and 1920

Betteravia was a company town founded on the former Rancho Punta de Laguna around the turn of the 20th century and existed for nearly ninety years. The Union Sugar Refining Company established a sugar beet farm here in 1897. At one time this community supported a population of 350 residents, the vast majority of whom were employed by the Union Sugar Company. The community consisted of 65 cottages, a hotel, a church, a schoolhouse, a post office, an amusement hall, a general store, a gasoline station, and a fire department. Housing consisted of small cottages, larger 2-3 bedroom homes, a larger superintendents home, and a very large plant managers home complete with fish ponds and an aviary. Housing was determined by plant seniority. It was common for employees to move to better housing within the community as they gained more responsibility in the plant.

The Pacific Coast Railway built an electrified line from Santa Maria to Betteravia in 1906.

In 1951, Consolidated Foods acquired Union Sugar. In the early 1960s, the Union Sugar Company decided it no longer wanted to maintain the increasingly old infrastructure of the community and gave notice to all residents to evacuate. The homes were sold for an average of $50 each. Most of the homes were bought by their renters and moved, and some were bought by other individuals. However, some residents remained until 1966 when the company closed the town and finally evicted the remaining residents.

Holly Sugar acquired the sugar plant from Sara Lee (formerly Consolidated Foods), in 1981. On March 8, 1988, the sugar refinery plant, then owned by Imperial Holly (now known as Imperial Sugar), suffered a dust explosion and fire which resulted in the injury of eight employees, seven critically. Following the closure of Imperial Holly's Betteravia sugar plant here in 1993, Betteravia became a ghost town with many vacant and demolished buildings.

== Betteravia Industrial Park ==
On September 8, 2008, the Santa Maria Valley Railroad moved its corporate office and yard operations to the former Union Sugar site. The SMVRR had redeveloped the site and it is now the Betteravia Industrial Park, providing transload operations to rail freight customers not located on a rail line. Some of the buildings are being renovated, and the old townsite is being preserved. The SMVRR has since moved its headquarters to 1599 'A' Street.

A former Union Sugar 0-4-0 Tender Saddle-Tank steam locomotive '1' is on static display at the SMAT centre. The Tender is believed to have been scrapped for the war effort during World War II. The location is behind the old Hancock engine shops and is operated by the Santa Maria Valley Railway Historical Museum. Other displays include a Canadian National speeder, a former wooden Caboose, a Sacramento Northern Boxcar, and a signal, all on static display.

== See also ==
- History of Santa Maria, California
