= Santa Maria Valley Railroad =

Californian railroad

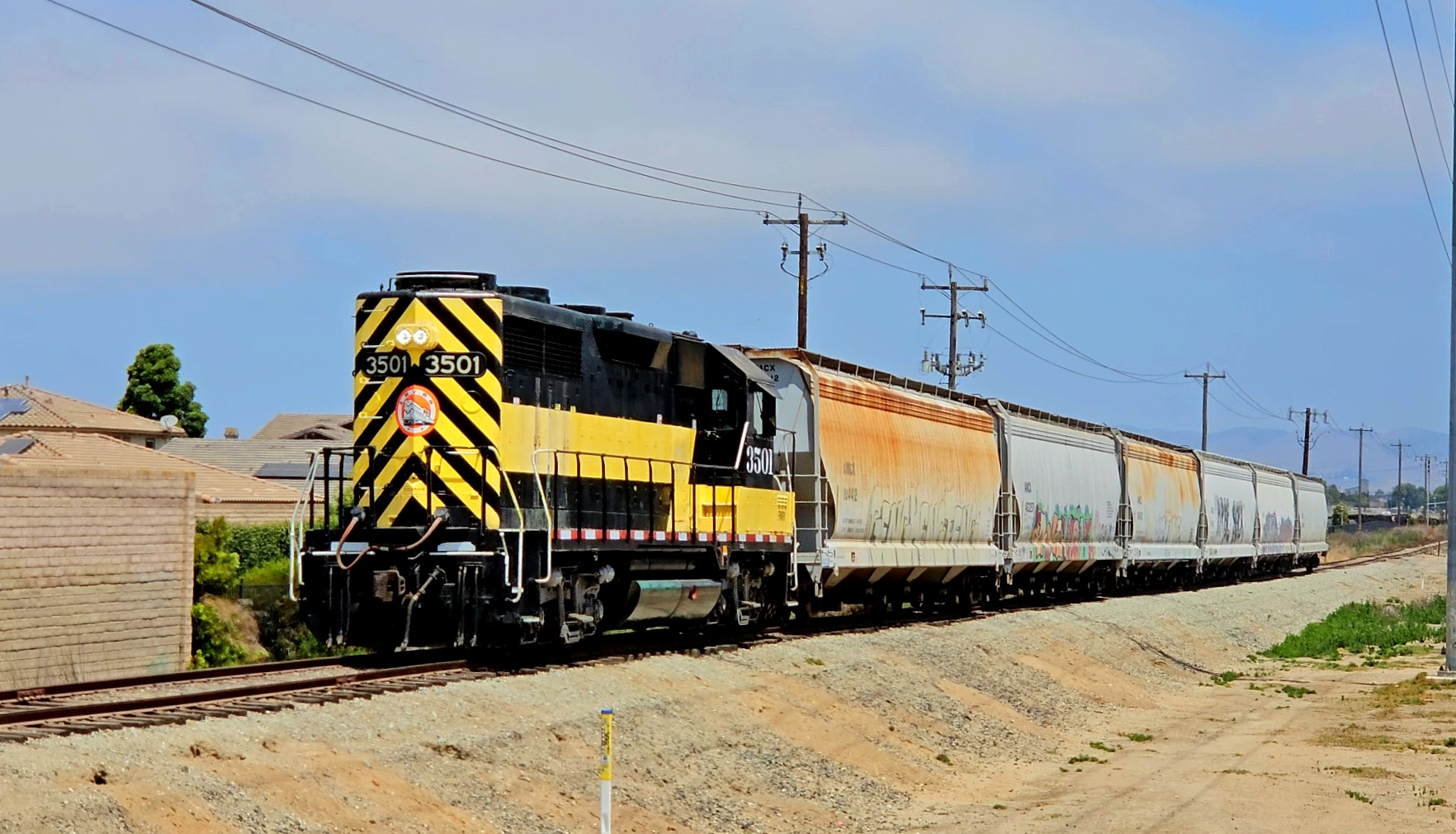

Overview
- Headquarters: Santa Maria, California
- Reporting mark: SMV
- Locale: Santa Barbara County, California
- Dates of operation: 1911–present

Technical
- Track gauge: 4 ft 8 1/2 in (1,435 mm) standard gauge

Other
- Website: www.smvrr.com

The Santa Maria Valley Railroad (reporting mark SMV) is a 14.8 miles (23.8 km) shortline railroad that interchanges with the Union Pacific Railroad's (former Southern Pacific) Coast Line at Guadalupe, California. As of 2006, the Railroad is owned by the Coast Belle Rail Corporation.

== Traffic ==
The SMV handles 2,000 cars annually (1996 estimate). Commodities hauled include:

- Asphalt
- Fertilizer
- Fresh and Frozen Food products
- Gypsum wallboard
- Lumber
- Machinery
- Petroleum Products
- Plastic
- Scrap iron

Prior traffic included:

- Beer
- Sugar and Sugar beets

== Passenger service ==
Special passenger service was only offered during World War II on the Air Base branch to transport military personnel to the Santa Maria Army Air Base for training. The Air Base branch was constructed in 1943. Excursions were offered for the first time on the SMVRR in November 2006, continuing into 2007.

== History ==
The SMV was incorporated on July 14, 1911 as the Santa Maria Valley Railway at Los Angeles, California with A. A. Dougherty listed as President.

The first 3.26 miles (5.25 km) of track, from the Southern Pacific connection at Guadalupe to Betteravia Junction, was built by the SP in August 1899 to get to a sugar mill. The SP leased the track to the SMV years later. From Betteravia the SMV built to Santa Maria and on to Roadamite. The SMV also had branches running from Stowell to Air Base, Suey to Rosemary Farms and Rex to Gates.

By 1925 the railway traffic had steeply declined and the railway went bankrupt. Captain George Allan Hancock , a principal of the Dominion Oil Company, purchased the railroad for $75,000 at a Sheriff's auction. The railroad was then reorganized as the Santa Maria Valley Railroad in 1926. Until 2006, the railroad was owned by Captain G. Allan Hancock's estate.

The original line ran for 23 miles (37 km), from Guadalupe to Roadamite. The track from Gates to Roadamite was abandoned in 1950.

The last run of No. 21, Captain Hancock's favorite steam locomotive, was in February 1962. Captain Hancock took the throttle one last time. Walt Disney was in the cab with Captain Hancock.

Baldwin 21 currently is undergoing restoration in Astoria, Oregon to be returned to excursion service.

The Union Sugar Beet plant closed in 1993, ending the beet train era.

In 1999 the G. Allan Hancock Estate gained full control of the SMV. The assets of the railroad were sold to Coast Belle Rail Corporation in 2006, ending an 81-year ownership by the Hancock family.

On March 12, 2025, OmniTrax entered into a joint venture for the Santa Maria Valley Railroad, becoming the 29th railroad in the OmniTRAX national rail network.

Other than No. 21, three other steam locomotives are in existence. Following a successful 38 year restoration, the Baldwin Locomotive Works 1924-built No. 205 was sold to the Albany and Eastern Railroad in Lebanon, Oregon and is used on the Santiam Excursion Trains. No. 100 is in Nevada, but has not yet entered restoration by the Virginia and Truckee. No. 1000 resides on Static Display in Griffith Park at Travel Town.

=== Timeline ===
- July 14, 1911 Santa Maria Valley Railway organized
- August 23, 1911 grading commenced
- September 28, 1911 laying rails commenced
- March 15, 1912 construction completed
- October 7, 1911 first train operated
- 1926 Santa Maria Valley Railway reorganized as the Santa Maria Valley Railroad
- 1950 track abandoned between Gates and Roadamite
- 2006 Purchased by the Coast Belle Rail Corp. from the descendants of G.A. Hancock family
- 2008 All track east of McClelland Street now vacated. Offices moved to Betteravia Industrial Park (at the site of the old sugar mill).
- 2025: OmniTrax enters into a joint agreement with the SMVRR

== Route ==
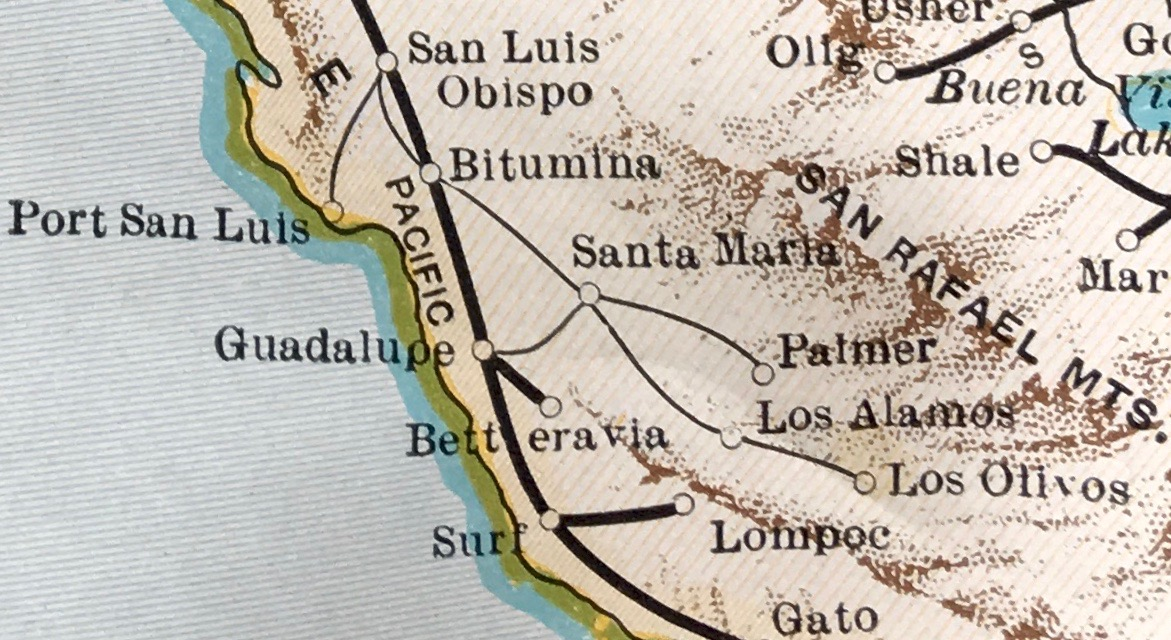
Route in 1931

=== Main Route ===
- Guadalupe (interchange with UP - former SP) originally leased to SMV by SP.
- Betteravia Junction
- Carr
- Pacer
- Midco
- Santa Maria

=== Air Base Branch (Santa Maria Army Air Base) ===
- Santa Maria
- Airbase (also with a spur to Pesco)

=== Betteravia Branch ===
- Betteravia Junction
- Gumm (Iremel)
- Betteravia

=== Rosemary Branch (abandoned) ===
- Santa Maria
- Suey
- Rosemary (Rosemary Farms)
- Battles

=== Gates Branch (abandoned) ===
- Rosemary (named after owner G. Allan Hancock's daughter)
- Rex
- Gates
- Roadamite (Gates - Roadamite abandoned in 1950)

== Motive power ==
The SMV has 6 locomotives:

- SMV #70 a GE 70-ton switcher built in January 1950 (Builder No. 30381) acquired for operation in November 1972 from Fort Dodge DM&S
- SMV #80 a GE 70-ton switcher built in December 1953 (Builder No. 32207) acquired for parts for its fleet of 70-ton switchers in November 1972 from Fort Dodge DM&S
- SMV #1801 an EMD GP9 built in June 1959 (Builder No. 25314) Built for Milwaukee Road as their #319
- BUGX #1322, a former Atchison Topeka & Santa Fe (AT&SF) EMD GP7(u), still with the original Blue and Gold Paint Scheme (leased). In July of 2025, the loco left the property and headed north.
- FWRY 3501 EMD GP35, purchased from the Fillmore and Western Railway in 2021.
- OMLX 2025, a rebuilt former Kennecott Copper EMD GP39-2, delivered in July of 2025.

The SMV operated five 70 ton switchers and one U6B that were acquired between 1948-1959.

Complete roster of Locomotives Owned by the Santa Maria Valley Railroad
#	Builder	SN	Type	Built	Acq'	Ret'	Dispoistion	Notes
1	Schenectady	1588	4-6-0	9/1882	1911	1913	Scrapped	Was Southern Pacific of Arizona #69.
1 (2nd)	Baldwin	31418	2-8-0	8/1907	1913	1925	to #15	Originally Tonopah & Tidewater #5, purchased from that road
2	Baldwin	29312	2-6-0	8/1906	1913	1925	to #12	Originally Tonopah & Tidewater #4, purchased from that road
12	Baldwin	29312	2-6-0	8/1906	1925	1937	Scrapped	Previously #2
15	Baldwin	31418	2-8-0	8/1907	1925	1933	Scrapped	Previously #1
21	Baldwin	58638	2-8-2	4/1925	1925	1962	Stored	New. Leased to Shasta-McCloud Steam Rail Tour in 1966. See history. Being restored in Astoria, OR
100	Baldwin	59284	2-8-2	6/1926	1942	1962	Sold	Was Pope & Talbot, Inc. Sold to White Mountain Scenic RR. See history. Under restoration at Virginia and Truckee Railroad
125	Baldwin	52790	2-6-2	1/1920	Unk	1947	Scrapped	Was Columbia & Nehalem River #125
150	Baldwin	55804	2-8-2	11/1922	Unk	1951	Scrapped	Was Vance Lumber Company #4
205	Baldwin	57613	2-6-2	1/1924	1933	1950	Operational	Was San Joaquin & Eastern #205. Donated to 37th Agricultural District. See history. Restored. At Albany & Eastern Railroad in Lebanon, Oregon
1000	Alco Schenectady	61535	2-8-2	1/1920	1944	1954	Donated	Was Newaukum Valley #1000. Donated to Travel Town Museum. See history.
10	General Electric	30019	70-ton	6/1948	1948		Scrapped	
20	General Electric	30176	70-ton	7/1948	1948		Sold	Sold to Peninsula Terminal
30	General Electric	30447	70-ton	8/1950	1950	2000	Sold	Sold to Nevada Northern, soon sold to Colorado, Kansas & Pacific Railroad
40	General Electric	31282	70-ton	3/1952	1952	2000	Sold	Sold to Nevada Northern, soon sold to Colorado, Kansas & Pacific Railroad
50	General Electric	31283	70-ton	3/1952	1952		Sold	Sold to Peninsula Terminal
60	General Electric	33494	U6B	5/1959	1959	1992	Scrapped	
70	General Electric	30381	70-ton	1/1950	1972		Operational	Was Fort Dodge, Des Moines & Southern #411
80	General Electric	32207	70-ton	12/1953	1972		Operational	Was Fort Dodge, Des Moines & Southern #401
1801	EMD	59E-90	GP9	6/1959	1992		Operational	Was Great Western of Colorado #1801
2025	Rebuilt EMD		GP39-2		2025		Operational	Lettered OMLX. Rebuilt former Kennecott Copper EMD GP39-2

Roster from the Friends of the SMV: https://friends-smvrr.org/images/history/SMVRR-roster.pdf

Also see The Diesel Shop Roster: https://www.thedieselshop.us/SMVR.HTML

== See also ==
- List of California railroads

== Additional reading ==
- Lustig, David (December 2020). "Short line: Santa Maria Valley". Trains. Kalmbach Media. p. 46.
