= Rincon Point (Texas) =

Coordinates: 27°50′09″N 097°22′45″W

Rincon Point, is a cape in Nueces County, Texas. It lies north of Corpus Christi, Texas between Nueces Bay and Corpus Christi Bay.
