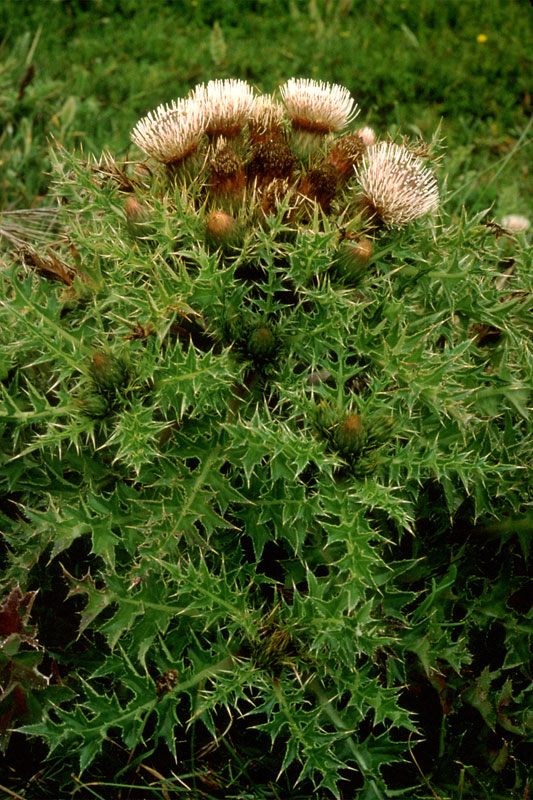

Conservation status
- Endangered (ESA)

Scientific classification
- Kingdom: Plantae
- Clade: Embryophytes
- Clade: Tracheophytes
- Clade: Angiosperms
- Clade: Eudicots
- Clade: Asterids
- Order: Asterales
- Family: Asteraceae
- Genus: Cirsium
- Species: C. loncholepis

Binomial name
- Cirsium loncholepis Petr.

= Cirsium loncholepis =

Species of thistle

Cirsium loncholepis is a rare species of thistle known by the common name La Graciosa thistle. It is endemic to California, where it is known from about 15 remaining occurrences in wetlands where southwestern San Luis Obispo County borders northwestern Santa Barbara County. It grows in coastal scrub and sand dunes, marshes, and moist grasslands in the watersheds of local rivers, including the Santa Maria River. It is a federally listed endangered species.

This native thistle may exceed a meter in height and sometimes forms a mound with fleshy, ridged stem branches. The leaves are deeply cut into lobes, toothed and wavy along the edges, the lowest leaves approaching 30 centimeters in length. The inflorescence is a tight cluster of flower heads, each up to 3 or 4 centimeters long. The flower head is lined with spiny phyllaries and filled with purple-tinted white flowers with purple anthers. The fruit is a compressed achene a few millimeters long topped with a pappus which may be 2.5 centimeters in length.

The conservation status of this population of thistles may be reevaluated as taxonomy studies suggest they may be members of the more common species Cirsium scariosum.
