= Moro Canyon =

- Location of Moro Canyon in California

Location
- Country: United States
- State: California

Physical characteristics
- Source: San Joaquin Hills
  - coordinates: 33°35′40″N 117°47′01″W
  - elevation: 941 ft (287 m)
- Mouth: Pacific Ocean
  - location: North of Laguna Beach
  - coordinates: 33°33′37″N 117°49′18″W
  - elevation: 0 ft (0 m)
- Length: 3.34 mi (5.38 km)

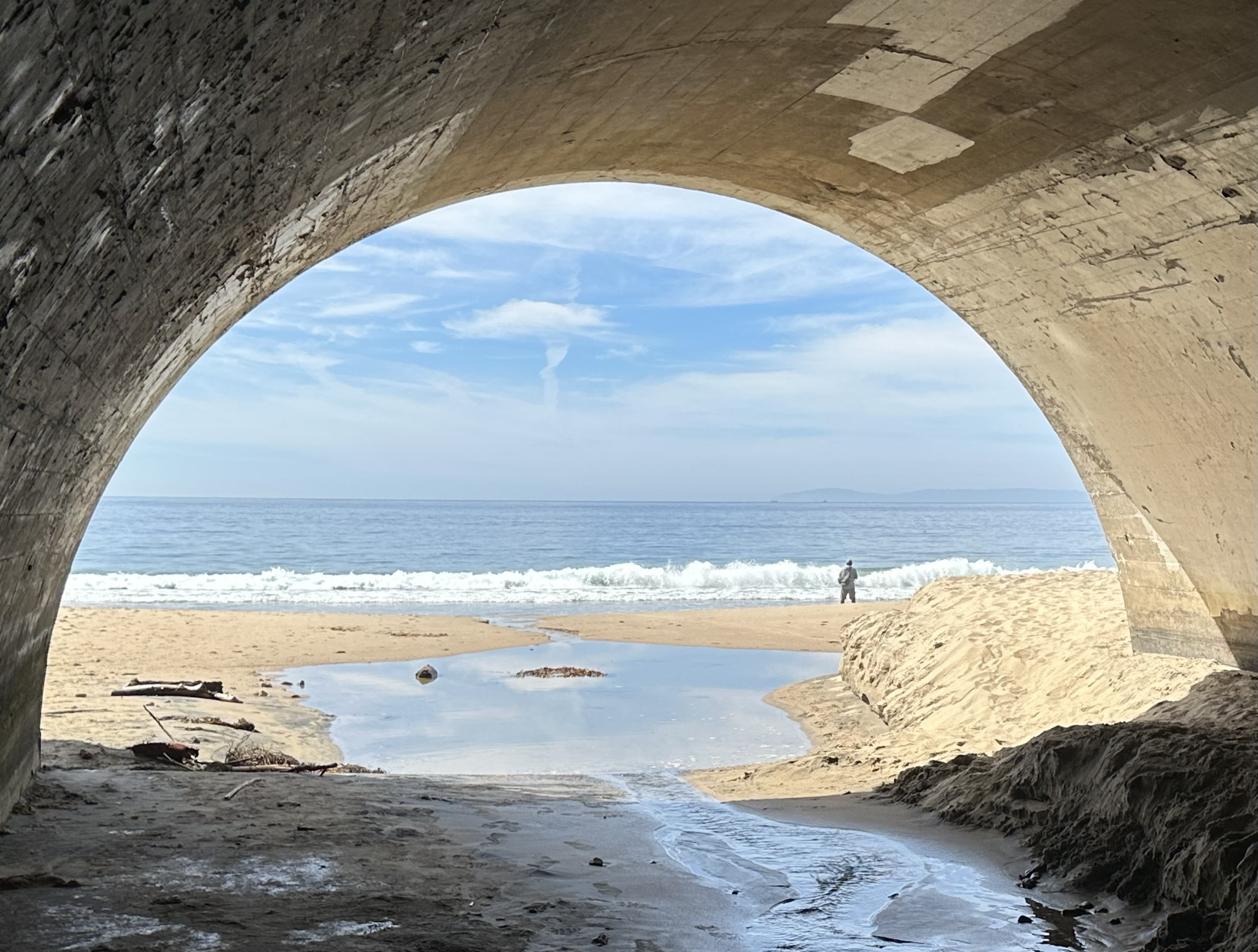
Moro Canyon Creek flows under the Pacific Coast Highway thru the Crystal Cove State Park Tunnel to empty into the Pacific Ocean at Moro Beach.

Moro Canyon is a canyon and seasonal stream near Laguna Beach, Orange County, California in the Crystal Cove State Park. Moro Canyon Creek originates at the summit of the San Joaquin Hills and flows southwest, under Pacific Coast Highway to empty into the Pacific Ocean at Moro Beach.

The 3.4-mile (5.5 km) long Moro Canyon Trail traverses the whole length of the canyon. The Moro Ridge Trail, along the South Rim, provides access to the Upper Moro and Lower Moro Campgrounds.

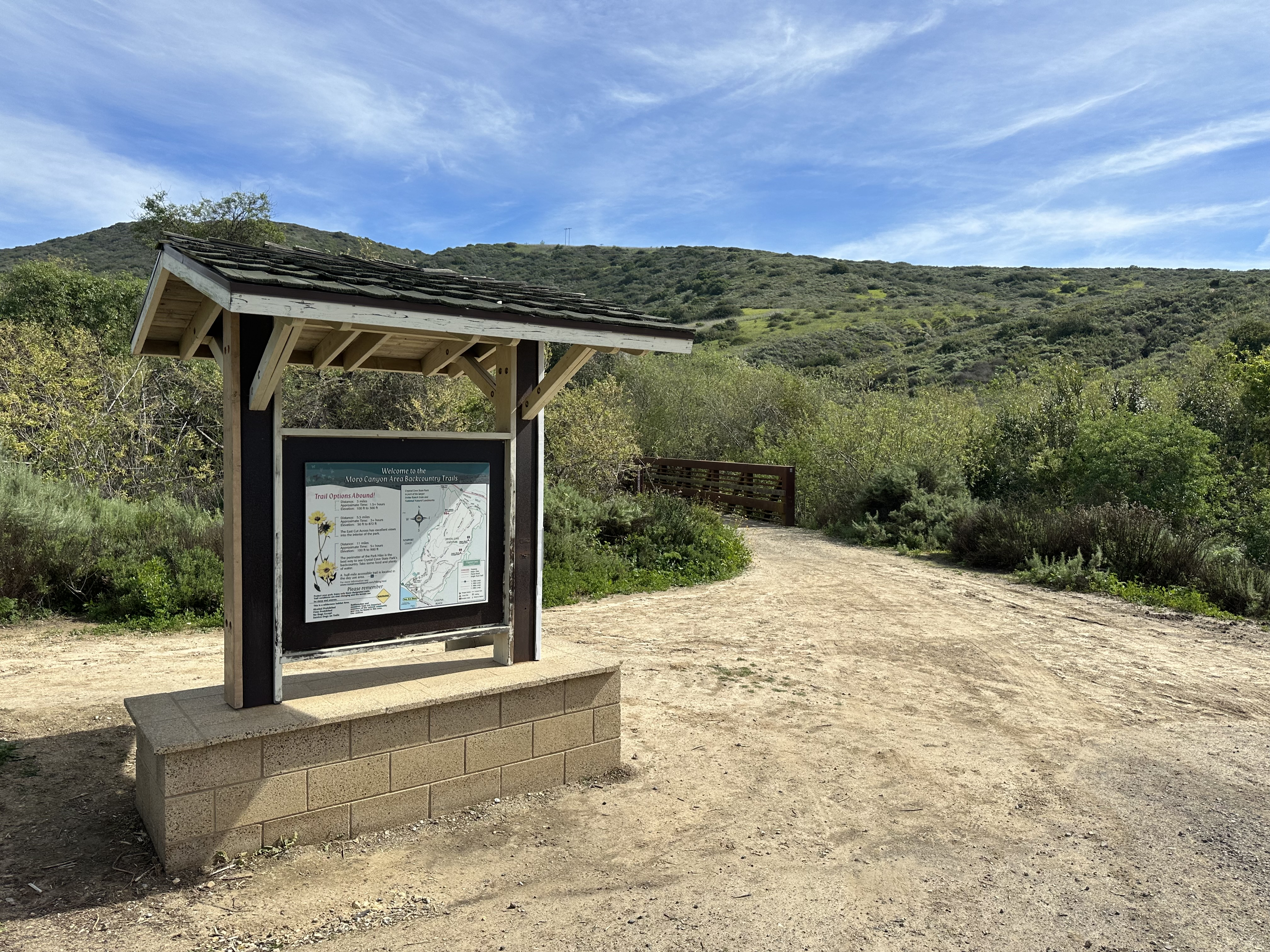
Crystal Cove State Park Trail

One of the first developments in Crystal Cove State Park was Tyron's Camp, opened in 1927 along the PCH at Moro Canyon.

Moro Canyon marks the boundary between the Santa Ana water resource basin and the Laguna–San Diego Coastal water resource basin, two of the 2,200 water resource basins of the U.S. hydrologic unit system.

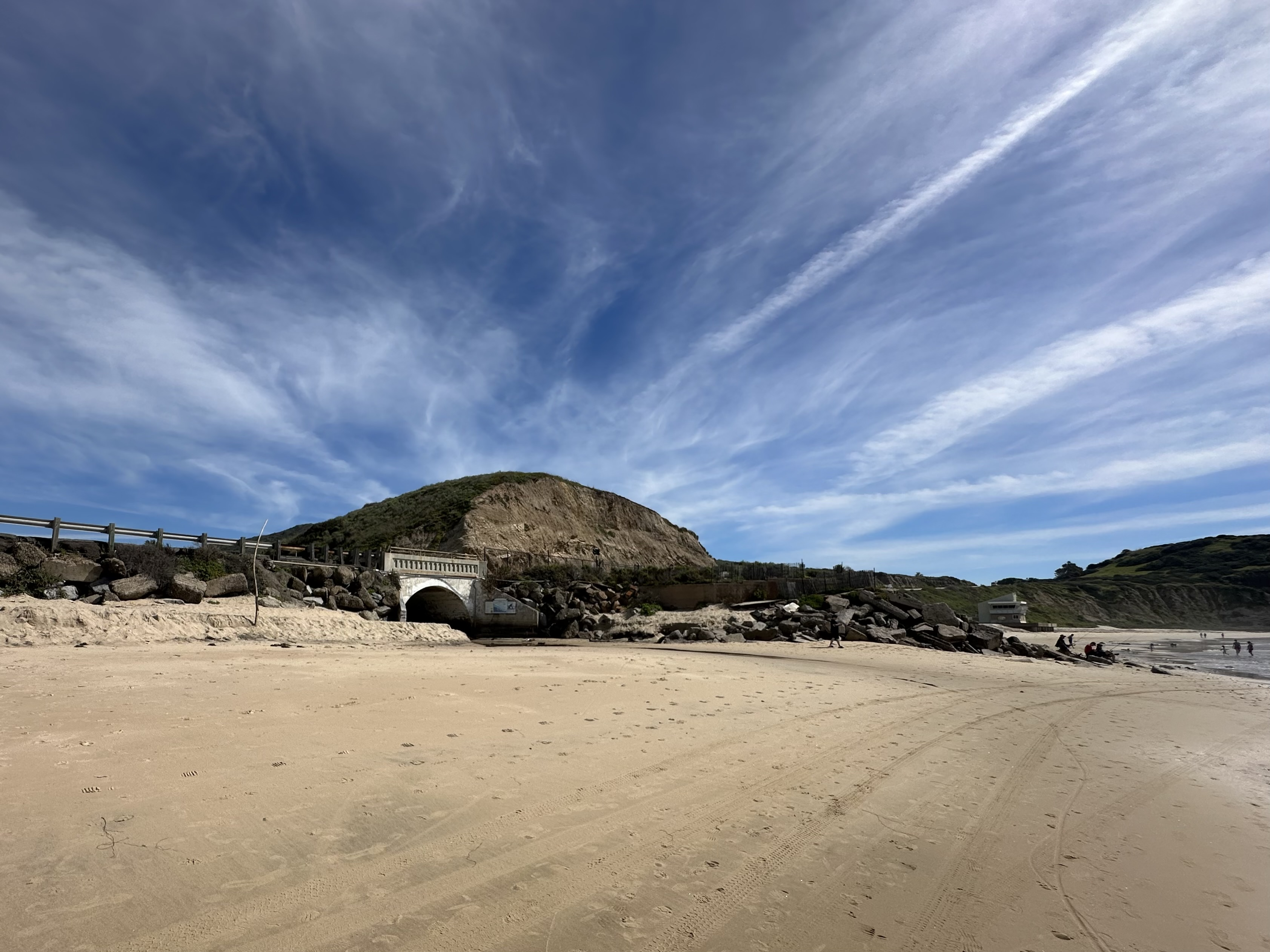
Crystal Cove State Park Tunnel

== See also ==
- List of rivers of Orange County, California
