= Rancho Guadalupe =

Land grant in California

Coordinates: 34.940°N 120.610°W

Rancho Guadalupe was a 43,682-acre (176.77 km^{2}) Mexican land grant in present-day northwestern Santa Barbara County and southwestern San Luis Obispo County, California given in 1840 by Governor Juan B. Alvarado to Diego Olivera and Teodoro Arellanes. The grant extended along the Pacific coast, and encompassed present-day Guadalupe.

== History ==
Diego Antonio de la Luz Olivera (1786 -1868) was the son of José Ygnacio Olivera. He was an unmarried man without heirs when he died in 1868. José Teodoro Arellanes (1782–1858), he was a soldier at the Presidio of Santa Barbara when he married María Sirilda Procopia Ruiz in 1802. After she died, he married the widow, Maria Josefa Rodriguez (1786–1851) in 1812. Teodoro Arellanes was granted Rancho El Rincon in 1835, and Rancho Guadalupe in 1840.

With the cession of California to the United States following the Mexican-American War, the 1848 Treaty of Guadalupe Hidalgo provided that the land grants would be honored. As required by the Land Act of 1851, a claim for Rancho Guadalupe was filed with the Public Land Commission in 1852, and the grant was patented to Diego Olivera and Teodoro Arellanes in 1870.

In 1861, in an often cited legal case concerning a married woman's rights in community property under the law of California, the estate of Josefa Rodriguez de Arellanes sued the estate of José Teodoro Arellanes over the ownership of Rancho Guadalupe.

Following the drought of 1863–64, Rancho Guadalupe passed into the hands of the family of José Joaquín Estudillo (1800 –1852), grantee of Rancho San Leandro, and his wife, Juana Martínez de Estudillo. In 1866, Juana Martínez de Estudillo, whose mother was a sister of Teodoro Arellanes, bailed José Teodoro Arellanes son, Antonio Arellanes, out of foreclosure, by acquiring Rancho Guadalupe. In 1867, José Joaquín Estudillo's sons-in-law, John B. Ward who was married to Concepcion Estudillo, daughter of José Joaquín Estudillo, started farming operations on Rancho Guadalupe. Ward also commenced construction of a wagon road from Point Sal to Fort Tejon. Ward never finish the road, but Congress granted him the triangular Point Sal tract of land that was not part of Rancho Guadalupe grant, on the basis of the nine miles (14 km) completed and his claim that a natural route existed the rest of the way to Fort Tejon. However, the following year, 1868, Guadalupe Rancho fell into receivership. Ward sold his interest in the rancho and it was taken over by John Nugent, who was married to Magdalena Estudillo {1842- }another daughter of Jose Joaquin Estudillo. A colony of about twenty farmers bought parcels of land in 1872.

The original Rancho Guadalupe grant was described by boundaries, rather than a specific area, and was confirmed by the Commission and District Court containing 32,408 acres (131.15 km^{2}). Rancho Guadalupe and Rancho Punta de Laguna shared a common border, but a combination of vague definition and government errors produced three different surveys and two patents and lengthy litigation. A third survey pushed the boundary with Rancho Punta de Laguna east. However, the boundary of Rancho Punta de Laguna, was fixed by its patented in 1873. After seven more years of litigation, in 1880 the US confirmed the owners of Rancho Guadalupe, leaving the owners of Rancho Punta de Laguna short. The Rancho Punta de Laguna owners then turned to congress. In 1890, congress gave the Rancho Punta de Laguna owners rights to unoccupied California land equal to what they had lost.

== See also ==
- Ranchos of California
- List of Ranchos of California
