= Rincon Point (Santa Barbara County) =

Cape on the Santa Barbara Channel

- Cape
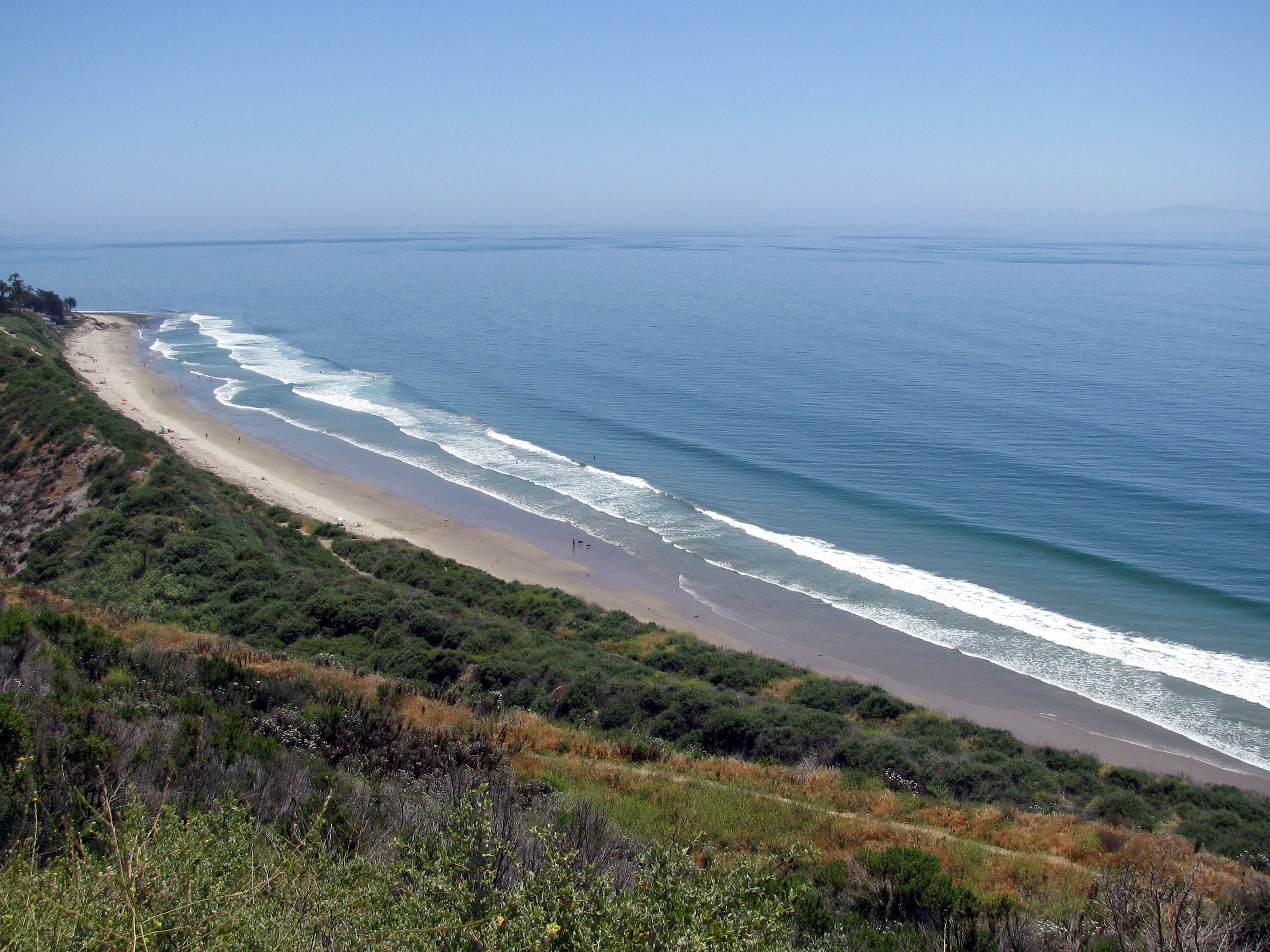
- Rincon point from the Santa Barbara County side

- Coordinates: 34°22′23″N 119°28′42″W

Rincon Point is a cape on the Santa Barbara Channel at the boundary between Santa Barbara County and Ventura County. This landmark is the site of the Rincon surf spot. A gated residential community occupies much of Rincon Point and straddles the countyline that roughly follows Rincon Creek down out of the Santa Ynez Mountains to the Pacific Ocean, just east of the extremity of Rincon Point.
