= Rincon Creek (Southern California) =

Stream between Santa Barbara and Ventura

Rincon Creek is a creek that marks the boundary between Santa Barbara and Ventura County, California. The Santa Barbara County - Ventura County Line follows Rincon Creek from near its source in the Santa Ynez Mountains near Divide Peak, at 34°28′36″N 119°26′29″W, down to its mouth on the Pacific Ocean, just east of the extremity of Rincon Point.

Rincon Creek is also the boundary between the Central California Coastal water resource subregion and the Southern California Coastal water resource subregion, two of 222 subregions of the United States hydrologic unit system.
