= Saltwater intrusion in California =

The State of California enforces several methodologies through technical innovation and scientific approach to combat saltwater intrusion in areas vulnerable to saltwater intrusion. Seawater intrusion is either caused by groundwater extraction or increased in sea level. For every 1-foot of freshwater depression (0.30 m), sea-salty waters rises 40 feet (12 m) as the cone of depression forms. Salinization of groundwater is one of the main water pollution ever produced by mankind or from natural processes. It degrades water quality to the point it passes acceptable drink water and irrigation standards.

== Monitoring Seawater Intrusion ==
Understanding the extent and rate of saltwater intrusion are key elements for sustainable water management. Ineffective management means low water quality for urban sectors and agriculture. Effective management strategies include monitoring seawater intrusion in areas prone to saltwater intrusion. Common approach for monitoring seawater intrusion include measuring groundwater level, hydrograph analysis, water quality sampling and geophysical logging. These procedures provide discrete and tangible information for early-warning signs regarding saltwater intrusion adjacent to lands and groundwater aquifers. Airborne electromagnetic measurement is used by helicopters to map out electrical resistivity. This method can provide useful information concerning water quality over 100 miles (160 km) in a day by penetrating through sea surfaces to a depth of 1,500 feet (460 m). Using airborne geophysical measurement yields useful data for interpretation and hydrological information.

== Los Angeles County ==
Groundwater basin in Los Angeles County is considered as a vital resource both for agricultures and residential areas. For more than 40 years, Los Angeles County have managed to protect local groundwater basins from seawater intrusion. By injecting freshwater along coastal regions, Los Angeles County tends to create hydraulic gradients between freshwater and saltwater. This prevents saltwater to advance further inland. One critical factor affecting water supply in Los Angeles is population growth. As population growth increases in Los Angeles County, saltwater intrusion tends to advance further inland into Los Angeles groundwater aquifers. This occurs due to population growth, demanding an excess amount of freshwater from groundwater pumping wells. This sets an hydrologic condition for saltwater to follow the geomorphic pressure gradient produced landward. A cone of depression develops as a result through pumping wells operation to supply water for residential areas and agriculture. To combat saltwater intrusion, Los Angeles water districts decides to construct injection wells to form an hydraulic barrier, preventing advancement of saltwater intrusion in Los Angeles aquifers. Geologists, however, continue to study and survey Los Angeles County coastline because creating this hydraulic gradients is not fully efficient. To better understand saltwater intrusion in Los Angeles County, the U.S Geological Survey partners with Water Replenishment District of Southern California and Los Angeles County Department of Public Works to conduct a geological survey through using reflection seismology. This means that seismic profiles is essential to understand how sedimentation influence saltwater intrusion.

=== Managing Seawater Intrusion ===
The Alamitos Barrier Project is one of the three hydraulic barriers in Los Angeles County. It was created mainly to protect groundwater supplies from seawater intrusion. It is currently operated under Los Angeles County Flood Control District and the Orange County Water District. Other joint committees include the Water Replenishment District of Southern California who is responsible for supplying water to each hydraulic barrier and then the County of Los Angeles Department of Public Works who operates the projects on a daily basis. The effects of seawater intrusion took first noticed in 1956. As a response, a coastal barrier project was later built by the Orange County Water District to combat saltwater intrusion which remains prominent and troublesome to this day. Known as Water Factory 21, the District built in seven extraction wells located 2 miles away from the coast to intercept and send saltwater back into the sea. A series of 23 injection wells were also built further inland to create a powerful hydraulic barrier between saltwater and freshwater. The water supplies of Water Factory 21 undergo several phases before it reaches the injection wells. This man-made hydraulic processes includes air stripping, recarbonation, multi-media filtration, carbon sequestration and chlorination. 23,000 acres feet of water is produced each year to supply this amount of water into each injection wells to form effective yet inefficient hydraulic barrier. After each water droplet goes through each treatment, the injections wells distributes this vast amount of freshwater into the ocean and into the groundwater basin. Majority of this freshwater is flowed into the groundwater basin to meet consumers demands.

== Sacramento San-Joaquin Delta ==
Both the levee system and delta islands help protect freshwater hydrology and municipal water treatment facilities from saltwater intrusion. Under extreme drought conditions, the combined flow of fresh water from all of the San Joaquin river's tributaries is no longer sufficient to stem the brackish flows that come in from the bay on every tidal cycle. State officials have gone so far as to build levees across major saltwater in-flows in times of especially severe drought. Saltwater intrusion is temporarily stemmed in spring months when snow melt and rain runoff increase water volumes carried by the San Joaquin and Sacramento rivers, fending off saltwater intrusion. It is expected that the issue of saltwater intrusion in this delta will get worse as climate cycles affected by climate change push California further into drought, as stream flows further decrease in summer months after snowpack support has waned. Before human intervention, saltwater regularly flooded the marshes in the Delta, but the location of pumping stations providing water for agricultural and domestic use means that saltwater intrusion would be catastrophic for state's water supply. The health of the naturally formed barrier islands is critical for continued salt water exclusion, and is an active area of research.

=== Agricultural Drainage in the Delta ===
In the southernmost part of the Delta, the concentration of saltwater content increases as farmers irrigate their crops for fresh produce. The agricultural drainage water is where salinization intensified through the process of irrigation. In some occasion, there may be no delta water that is left to flush out and push back saltwater content within the delta, specifically in the south Delta. This creates a localize salinity problems for water managers to address or mitigate since salinity is highly concentrated.

=== Suisun Marsh ===
The Suisun Marsh is one of the largest brackish water wetlands in the Sacramento-San Joaquin Delta. This aquatic habitat is where freshwater and saltwater meets. Here lies 230 miles of levees protecting the Suisun Marsh. The Delta salinity greatly influenced the overall health of the Suisun Marsh. This include the ecosystem in this area, encompassing living plants and neighboring species. The State Water Project's Suisun Marsh Salinity Control Gates manages tidal flows to limit saltwater intrusion from salty tidal flows. The California's Department of Water Resources built this tidal-flow control gate to limit high saline first introduced from Grizzly Bay and through the Montezuma Slough.
