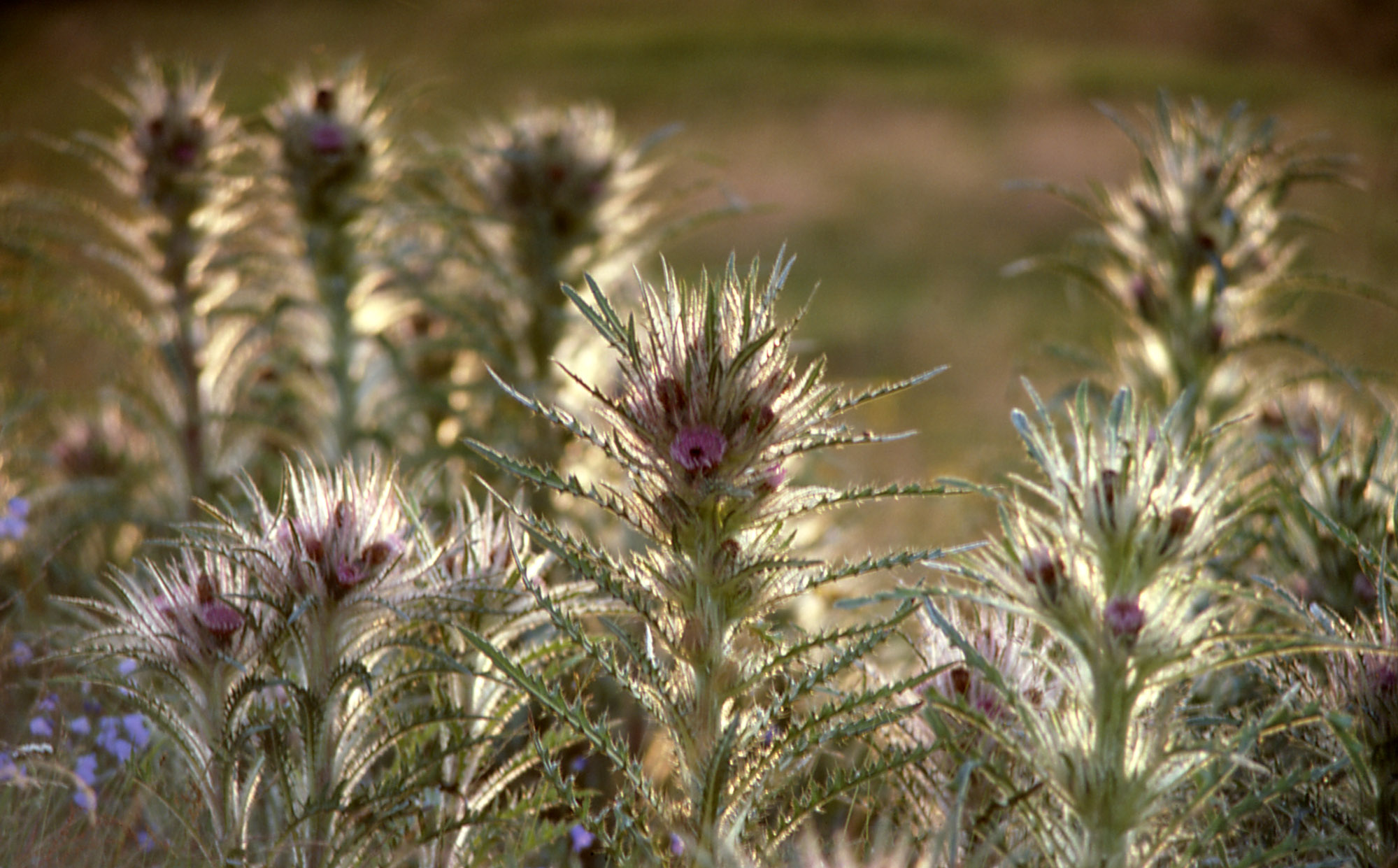

Conservation status
- Secure (NatureServe)

Scientific classification
- Kingdom: Plantae
- Clade: Tracheophytes
- Clade: Angiosperms
- Clade: Eudicots
- Clade: Asterids
- Order: Asterales
- Family: Asteraceae
- Genus: Cirsium
- Species: C. scariosum

Binomial name
- Cirsium scariosum Nutt.

Synonyms
- Synonymy: Carduus scariosus (Nutt.) A.Heller; Cirsium hookerianum var. scariosum (Nutt.) B.Boivin,

= Cirsium scariosum =

Species of thistle

Cirsium scariosum is a species of thistle known by the common names meadow thistle, elk thistle and dwarf thistle. It is native to much of western North America from Alberta and British Columbia, south to Baja California. There are also isolated populations on the Canadian Atlantic Coast, on the Mingan Archipelago in Québec, where it is called the Mingan thistle.

It was first published in Trans. Amer. Philos. Soc., ser.2, vol.7 on page 420 in 1841.

== Description ==
Cirsium scariosum is a variable species growing in a variety of habitat types. It is made up of several geographic races, most of which have been previously classified as species. The races intergrade but their morphologies can also be quite different. This is generally a biennial or perennial herb. It takes three main forms, a stemless, flat rosette with a cluster of flower heads in the centre, a mounding form with a short, erect stem, or a fully erect form reaching up to 200 cm (79 in) in height. When there is a stem it is usually fleshy, ridged, and woolly in texture. The leaves are sharply toothed or cut into toothed lobes, lined with spines, and up to 40 centimetres (16 inches) at their longest near the base of the plant. The inflorescence holds several flower heads, each up to 4 centimeters long and 5 cm wide. The flower head is lined with phyllaries which may have spines and teeth and filled with white to purple disc florets but no ray florets. The fruit is a compressed achene a few millimetres long topped with a pappus which may be 3 centimeters in length.

== Varieties ==
As accepted by Flora of North America;

- Cirsium scariosum var. americanum - California, Colorado, Idaho, Nevada, Oregon, Utah, Wyoming, Baja California
- Cirsium scariosum var. citrinum - California, Baja California
- Cirsium scariosum var. coloradense - Arizona, Colorado, New Mexico, Utah, Wyoming
- Cirsium scariosum var. congdonii - California, Nevada
- Cirsium scariosum var. robustum - California, Oregon
- Cirsium scariosum var. scariosum - Quebec, Alberta, British Columbia, California, Colorado, Idaho, Montana, Oregon, Utah, Washington, Wyoming
- Cirsium scariosum var. thorneae - Utah, Nevada, Idaho, Colorado
- Cirsium scariosum var. toiyabense- Nevada, Oregon, Idaho
