= Principal aquifers of California =

Water-holding formations below U.S. state

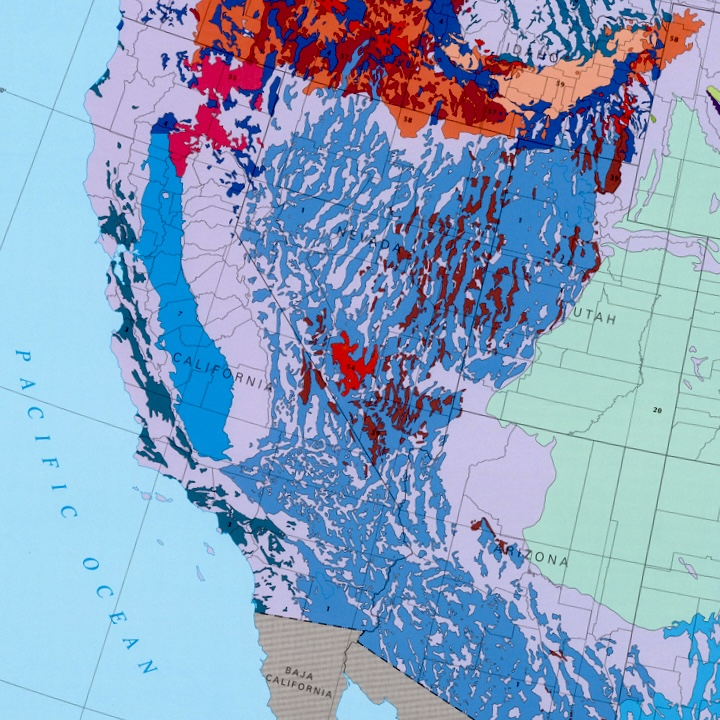
California aquifers, excerpted from map in Ground Water Atlas of the United States (USGS, 2000): Lavender is "other" for "rocks that generally yield less than 10 gal/min to wells"; dark green-blue (3) are the California coastal basin aquifers, bright-turquoise blue (7) is the Central Valley aquifer system, flat cobalt-blue (1) down south is Basin and Range aquifers

Principal aquifers of California are those principal aquifers of the United States that lie within (or rather, below) the California state boundaries. Per the Oxford Dictionary of Environment and Conservation, an aquifer is a "body of permeable and/or porous rock that is underlain by impermeable rock and through which groundwater is able to flow."

The state of California recognizes 515 groundwater basins and subbasins within these aquifers. The groundwater basin of a given aquifer may be managed by a water district; for example the Coachella Valley Water District manages the underground water in California's Coachella Valley groundwater basin (CA groundwater basin no. 7–021), which lies within the Colorado River hydrologic region, one of the 13 top-level California state hydrologic regions and drainage areas. The California state hydrologic regions and drainage areas are quite similar but not identical to the federal hydrologic unit system's California water resource region surface-water drainage basins. The California Department of Water Resources has detailed descriptions (online in PDF format, etc.) of each of the 515 state-recognized groundwater basins.

The principal aquifers of the United States are organized by national principal aquifer codes and names assigned by the National Water Information System (NWIS) of the United States Geological Survey. Aquifers are identified by a geohydrologic unit code (a three-digit number related to the age of the formation) followed by a four- or five-character abbreviation for the geologic unit or aquifer name.

Aquifer name	States overlying	Category	Rock type	NWIS Code
Basin and Range basin-fill aquifers	Arizona, California, Idaho, Nevada, New Mexico, Oregon, Utah	Aquifer	Sand and gravel aquifer	N100BSNRGB
Basin and Range carbonate-rock aquifers	Arizona, California, Idaho, Nevada, Utah	Aquifer	Carbonate-rock aquifer	N400BSNRGC
California Coastal Basin aquifers	California	Aquifer	Sand and gravel aquifer	N100CACSTL
Central Valley aquifer system	California	Aquifer system	Sand and gravel aquifers	S100CNRLVL
Pacific Northwest basin-fill aquifers	California, Idaho, Nevada, Oregon, Utah, Washington, Wyoming	Aquifer	Sand and gravel aquifer	N100PCFNWB
Pacific Northwest volcanic-rock aquifers	California, Idaho, Montana, Nevada, Oregon, Utah, Washington, Wyoming	Aquifer	Sand and gravel aquifer	N100PCFNWV

== See also ==
- Groundwater recharge
- Groundwater-dependent ecosystems
- Saltwater intrusion in California
- Groundwater Ambient Monitoring and Assessment Program
