= South Coast hydrologic region =

Regional subdivision, CA Dept of Water Resources

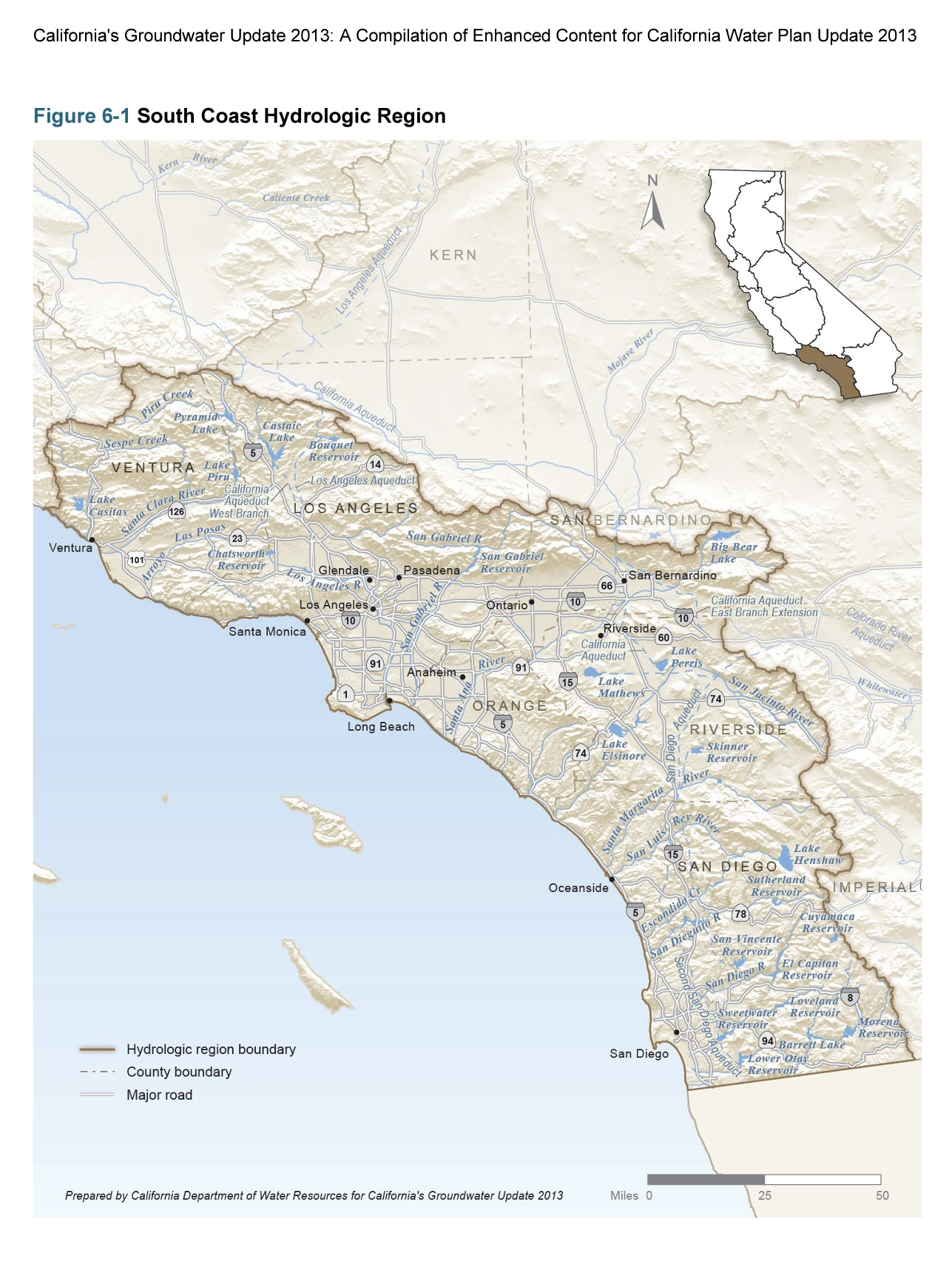
Geography and topography of South Coast Hydrologic Region

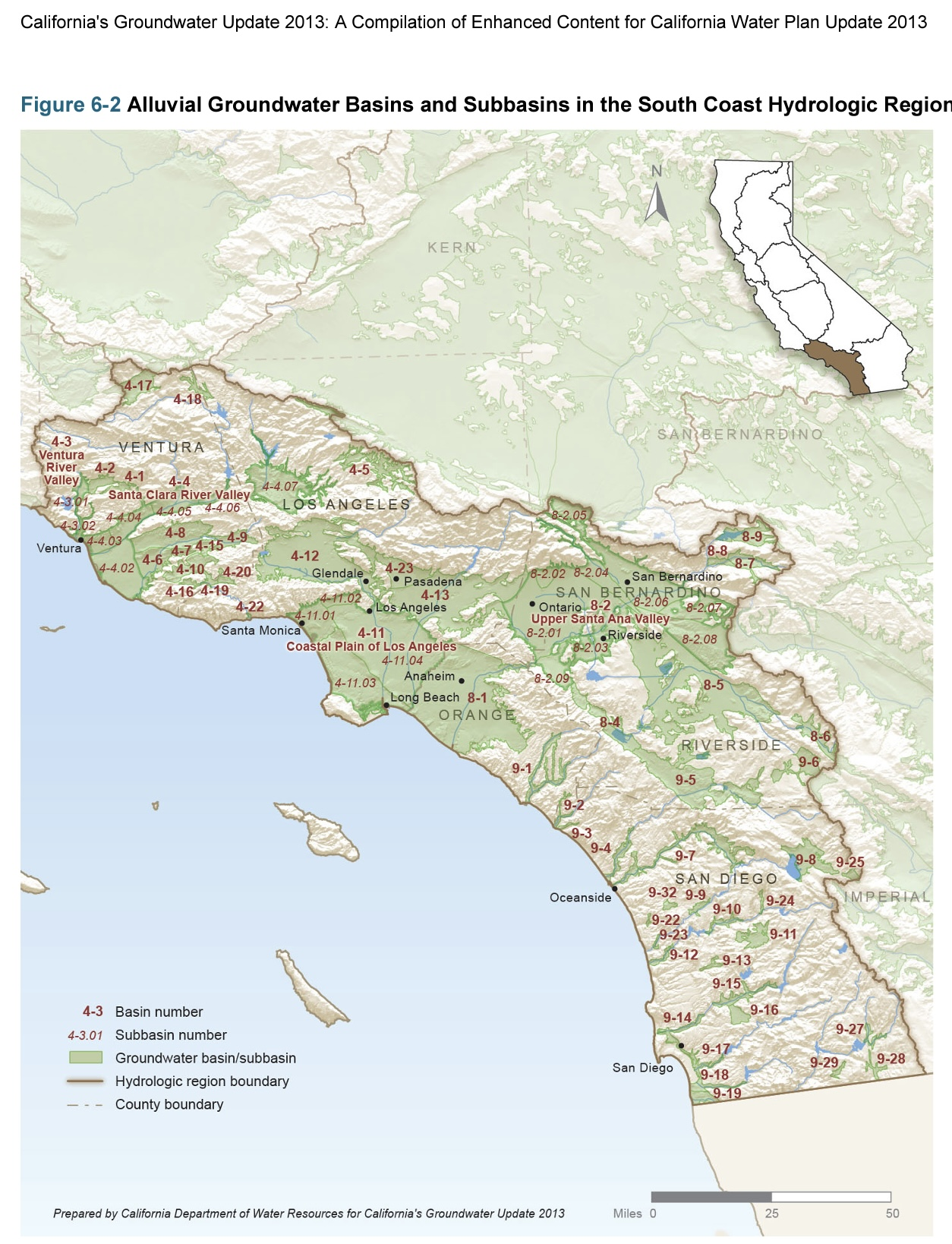
Alluvial groundwater basins and subbasins in the South Coast Hydrologic Region

The South Coast hydrologic region of California is one of the 10 major hydrologic regions of the state as identified by the California Department of Water Resources. The South Coast hydrologic region has a surface area of about 11,100 sq mi (29,000 km^{2}), and includes all of Orange County, major portions of Los Angeles, Riverside, San Bernardino, San Diego, and Ventura counties, and a small portion of Santa Barbara County. The state-defined South Coast hydrologic region is roughly equivalent to the federally defined Southern California Coastal water resource subregion. The South Coast hydrologic region has 78 state-recognized alluvial groundwater basins and subbasins.

Significant geographic features include the Transverse Ranges and the Peninsular Ranges. Major rivers in the region include the Los Angeles River, San Gabriel River, San Diego River, San Luis Rey River, Santa Ana River, Santa Clara River, Santa Margarita River, and Ventura River.

The climate in the region ranges from Mediterranean to subtropical steppe. Annual precipitation in the region ranges from more than 40 in (1,000 mm) in the mountains to less than 10 in (250 mm) in some valleys, with an overall average of 17.6 in (450 mm) for the region.

== Alluvial groundwater basins in the South Coast hydrologic region ==
The South Coast hydrologic region overlies an aquifer with a number of identified alluvial groundwater basins and subbasins. An alluvial groundwater basin is essentially the top level of an aquifer, above less-permeable rocks below, such as limestone and shale. Alluvium (from Latin alluvius, from alluere 'to wash against') is loose clay, silt, sand, or gravel that has been deposited by running water in a stream bed, on a floodplain, in an alluvial fan or beach, or in similar settings.

Alluvial groundwater basin	State basin code	Basin priority	Surface area (acres)	Well yield (gpm) Maximum	Well yield (gpm) Average	Notes
Upper Ojai Valley groundwater basin	4-1		3,800	200	50	
Ojai Valley groundwater basin	4-2	Medium	6,830	600	383	
Ventura River Valley groundwater Basin	4-3		12,710			
Santa Clara River Valley groundwater basin	4-4	High				
Acton Valley groundwater basin	4-5		8,270	1,000	140	
Pleasant Valley groundwater basin	4-6	Medium	21,600		1,000	
Arroyo Santa Rosa Valley groundwater basin	4-7	Medium	3,740	1,200	950	
Las Posas Valley groundwater basin	4-8	Medium	42,200	750		
Simi Valley groundwater basin	4-9		12,100		394	
Conejo Valley groundwater basin	4-10		28,900	1,000	100	
Coastal Plain of Los Angeles groundwater basin	4-11	High				
San Fernando Valley groundwater basin	4-12	High	145,000	3,240	1,220	
San Gabriel Valley groundwater basin	4-13	Medium	154,000	4,850	1,000	
Tierra Rejada groundwater basin	4-15		4,390	1,200	172	
Hidden Valley groundwater basin	4-16		2,210			
Lockwood Valley groundwater basin	4-17		21,800	350	25	
Hungry Valley groundwater basin	4-18		5,310		28	
Thousand Oaks Area groundwater basin	4-19		3,110		39	
Russell Valley groundwater basin	4-20		3,100		25	
Malibu Valley groundwater basin	4-22		613	1,060	1,030	
Raymond groundwater basin	4-23	High	26,200	3,620	1,880	
Coastal Plain of Orange County groundwater basin	8-2	High	224,000	4,500	2,500	
Upper Santa Ana River valley	8-3					
Elsinore groundwater basin	8-4		25,700	5,400		
San Jacinto groundwater basin	8-5	High	188,000			
Hemet Lake Valley groundwater basin	8-6		16,700	820	196	
Big Meadows Valley groundwater basin	8-7		14,200	120	34	
Seven Oaks Valley groundwater basin	8-8		4,080			
Bear Valley groundwater basin	8-9	Medium	19,600	1,00	500	
San Juan Valley groundwater basin	9-1	Medium	16,700	1,000		
San Mateo Valley groundwater basin	9-2		2,990			
San Onofre Valley groundwater basin	9-3		1,250			
Santa Margarita Valley groundwater basin	9-4	Medium	626	1,980		
Temecula Valley groundwater basin	9-5	High	87,800	1,750		
Cahuilla Valley groundwater basin	9-6	Medium	18,200	500		
San Luis Rey groundwater basin	9-7	Medium	37,000	2,000	500	
Warner Valley groundwater basin	9-8		24,000	1,800	800	
Escondido Valley groundwater basin	9-9		2,890	190	50	
San Pasqual Valley groundwater basin	9-10	Medium	4,540	1,700	1,000	
Santa Maria Valley groundwater basin	9-11		12,300	500	36	
San Dieguito Creek groundwater basin	9-12		3,560	1,800	700	
Poway Valley groundwater basin	9-13		2,470	200	100	
Mission Valley groundwater basin	9-14		7,350		1,000	
San Diego River Valley groundwater basin	9-15	Medium	9,890	2,000		
El Cajon Valley groundwater basin	9-16		7,160	300	50	
Sweetwater Valley groundwater basin	9-17		5,290	1,500	300	
Otay Valley groundwater basin	9-18		6,830	1,000	185	
Tijuana groundwater basin	9-19		7,410	2,000	350	
Batiquitos Lagoon Valley groundwater basin	9-22		741			Batiquitos Lagoon
San Elijo Valley groundwater basin	9-23		883	1,800		
Pamo Valley groundwater basin	9-24		1,500			
Ranchita Town Area groundwater basin	9-25		3,130	125	22	
Cottonwood Valley groundwater basin	9-26		3,850			
Campo Valley groundwater basin	9-27		3,550		<40	
Potrero Valley groundwater basin	9-28		2,020			
San Marcos Area groundwater basin	9-32		2,130		60	

== See also ==
- Southern California Coastal water resource subregion
