= Water trading =

Process of buying and selling water access entitlements

Water trading is the process of buying and selling water access entitlements, also often called water rights. The terms of the trade can be either permanent or temporary, depending on the legal status of the water rights. Some of the western states of the United States, Chile, South Africa, Australia, Iran and Spain's Canary Islands have water trading schemes. Some consider Australia's to be the most sophisticated and effective in the world. Some other countries, especially in South Asia, also have informal water trading schemes. Water markets tend to be local and informal, as opposed to more formal schemes.

Some economists argue that water trading can promote more efficient water allocation because a market based price acts as an incentive for users to allocate resources from low value activities to high value activities. There are debates about the extent to which water markets operate efficiently in practice, what the social and environmental outcomes of water trading schemes are, and the ethics of applying economic principles to a resource such as water.

In the United States, water trading takes on several forms that differ from project to project, and are dependent upon the history, geography, and other factors of the area. Water law in many western U.S. states is based in the doctrine of "prior appropriation," or "first in time, first in use." Economists argue that this has created inefficiency in the way water is allocated, especially as urban populations increase and in times of drought. Water markets are promoted as a way to correct these inefficiencies.

In addition to the supply of tap water, many local water resources are also being acquired by private companies, most notably Nestlé Waters with its numerous brands, in order to provide commodity for the bottled water industry. This industry – which often bottles common ground water and sells it as spring water – competes with local communities for access to their water supplies, and is accused of reselling the water at drastically higher prices compared to what citizens pay for tap water.

== Water trading markets ==
Water trading is a voluntary exchange or transfer of a quantifiable water allocation between a willing buyer and seller. In a water trading market, the seller holds a water right or entitlement that is surplus to its current water demand, and the buyer faces a water deficit and is willing to pay to meet its water demand. Local exchanges that occur for short durations between neighbors are considered "spot markets" and may operate under rules different from water rights trading markets.

=== Economic theory ===
Economic theory suggests that trade in water rights is a way to reallocate water from less to more economically productive activities. Water rights based on prior appropriation – first in time, first in right – led to inefficient water allocation and other inefficiencies, like overuse of land and less adoption of water conservation technologies. For example, it has been observed that urban users can pay up to 10 times more for water than agricultural users. Alternatively, water markets should provide a clear measure of the value of water and encourage conservation. Water trading can be a solution because marginal prices for users will be equalized and one price would allocate water according to each users demand curve; additionally information about the value of water in different uses will result, and compatible incentives will be created. Studies have shown that only modest transfers of water (10%) from agriculture to urban areas would be needed to bring allocation of developed uses into economic balance. Potential environmental benefits of trading can also include improved instream water quality, because water will not be diverted to the least economically productive users. Trading also re-allocates risk, whereas the prior appropriation system inefficiently and unequally allocates water and risk among similar users.

Water trading should be Pareto efficient, which means that the socially optimal water allocation is an allocation such that no person can be made better off without making someone worse off, and includes compensating transfers of money to losers. The socially optimum level is where water is allocated to those who value it most, though this can be contingent on reallocation in drought years. However, it is frequently not practicable to compensate losers from water transfers because of the difficulty of identifying them, or they may be located in different legal jurisdictions. Economists acknowledge that the final results of a water trading market and how they are achieved are important policy questions.

=== Conditions for a water trading market ===
The aforementioned benefits of water trading are improved as the following conditions are met:

- Voluntary buyers and sellers: Parties interested in buying must have access to water rights and those interested in selling their entitlements must be allowed to do so.
- Allocation of vested rights: In order to achieve efficiency in the distribution and use of water rights, available sources must be allotted to specific parties. While owners do not own the water itself, they do own the right to use the water. These property rights are established by a governing body and in many cases are available for sale or for lease.
- Information: In order to function efficiently in a market, participants must know their own estimated costs. One who owns the water rights of a specific area must know the quantity of water needed, the value of that water, and the point at which additional consumption of water is no longer beneficial (ex. Land has been fully irrigated and additional water would be detrimental).
- Clear definition of rights: This refers to measurement of bodies of water accessible by the rights’ holders. Bodies of water must be consistently identified, including the source of water body as well as measurement (acre/ft) of "right to use." Lack of clarity on permits or water rights allocation may lead to lost, null, or void transactions.
- Transferable from land rights: In reference to water ranching, water trading will be most efficient when access to water is independent of the land. Buying and selling of rights becomes less complicated when one is not considering the sale or lease of water and land.
- Changeable types of water use: As agricultural users of water rights are electing to sell or lease these allotments, the destination of the water will vary. It is necessary that transferred rights may be redeemed for whatever agricultural, municipal, industrial, or residential purpose it is assigned.

=== Types of trades ===
Several types of stakeholders are recognized as potential participants in a water market, including agricultural users, industrial, and urban, as well as those who value in stream uses for recreation, habitat preservation, or other environmental benefits. Water rights holders – particularly agricultural users – can make water available for trade by employing water conservation technology, through permanent fallowing, seasonal fallowing, shifts in crop choice, or voluntary water conservation (for example, residential water conservation practices). Trades can then be long-term leases, permanent transfers, short-term leases, or a callable transfer, which is the ability of a city to lease water under specified drought conditions. There are other flexible trade tools used by urban areas, such as water leasebacks, wherein the municipality purchases the water right from agricultural users and then can lease it back to those users in non-drought years, as a way to ensure the urban water supply. Banking water is a related tool, wherein water is stored underground in non-drought years to be used in drought years, though this is not to be confused with water banks, which are brokering institutions. Water ranching is a method of accessing unclaimed water rights that are legally bound to land rights. While many areas have detached these two types of rights from one another, some still prohibit the severing of rights and thus continue to promote water ranching. In the event of water ranching, the groundwater removed from the property is often much greater than that which would be used for average agricultural use, which can be harmful to the ecosystems which rely on it. This practice also creates inefficiency in the dispersal of land and water access ownership, as non-agricultural parties, such as municipalities, may purchase a plot of land simply for its water. Water credits: The idea is to have a tradable certificate which notifies the quantity of water saved by an institution, organization or an individual this would help in maximum utilization of every available drop of water. It may be defined as a permit that allows the holder to trade the conserved water in the international market at their current market price.

=== Justification for water trading markets ===
Establishing a water market may be an appropriate solution for the problem of distributing scarce water resources among increasing demand, depending on the historical, political, legal, and economic context of a community. For example, where prior-appropriation water rights dictate freshwater allocation, such as in the Western United States, new consumers may have little recourse to obtain sufficient water quantities to meet their demands without the use of water markets (alternatives to water markets are discussed below). Thus, historical appropriative rights might neglect consumers willing to pay more than current consumers. Water trading serves as a mechanism to promote the distribution of rights to those who value them most. Also, instream demands (that reflect the benefits that fisheries and lentic and lotic ecosystems receive from greater water flows, as well as benefits to water-dependent recreational activities or aesthetic appreciation) might be ignored in an appropriative system. For example, institutions governing water resources in the US have historically favored water allocation to uses that stimulate the economy, such as agricultural, hydroelectric, or municipal application. Correspondingly, western water law evolved to encourage water diversion offstream; water left instream was considered "wasteful" and so instream water demand was ignored.

There are multiple manifestations of water rights. Most commonly, water rights fall into the categories of prior-appropriation water rights and riparian water rights. Prior appropriation dictates that the first party to use the water for beneficial use maintains right to continue using it in this manner, unless they elect to sell or lease these rights. Riparian water rights are allocated to parties in ownership of land adjacent to a body of water. Frequently with riparian rights, the water rights cannot be severed from the land rights, and the water found within may not be transferred outside the watershed of origin. Both of these types of water rights are divided into "senior" and "junior" rights, appointed by the order in which they were allocated. The senior rights holders receive their water first, to be followed by the junior rights holders, and ideally there would be sufficient water for each party to redeem their allotments. In the absence of water trading, a drought may cause rights holders to lose their full access. In these drier seasons, it is possible for governing authorities to curtail junior water rights for a period of time to allow senior rights holders to redeem their full quantities through a process called priority administration.

Where water is scarce, tradable water rights may incentivize water conservation and make more water available for trading. Using the western appropriative rights system as an example, water rights are usufruct, indefinite, and senior or junior rights holders may forfeit their rights if they do not use their full water allocation for beneficial use (criteria for forfeiture and definition of "beneficial use" varies by state). Because rights holders do not "own" water rights, but merely consume water, they bear no cost for overconsumption, and may consume more water than needed to avoid forfeiture. Agricultural water users may intentionally apply water to low-value crops or water-intensive crops to justify and maintain their current water allocation. Thus, tradable rights may also encourage agricultural production of more high-value crops and/or less water-intensive crops. In the case of the western United States, as of 2006, irrigators typically consume more than 80% of freshwater, and so water trading markets could reallocate water to urban, environmental, and higher-value crop uses, where water is valued greater at the margin.

Water markets may be appropriate where there are no or inefficient rules established to govern groundwater use. Because groundwater is generally available to anyone who sinks a well and pumps, water tables worldwide have fallen precipitously in the last several decades. Diminishing aquifers and lower water tables are a concern because aquifers are relatively slow to recharge, and lower water tables can lead to salt intrusion and make freshwater unfit for consumption.

Generally, water markets are considered flexible instruments that, in theory, should adjust for changing prices, and respond to changing markets conditions (e.g. less rainfall, increased demand). Historically, certain communities, such as those in the western United States, may have responded to water shortage and increasing demand through supply-side solutions, like increased storage capacity and transportation infrastructure (e.g. dam and aqueduct construction). Due to higher capital costs, decreasing sites for dam construction, and increasing awareness of environmental damage from dam construction (consider impaired Northwest salmon runs, for one example), water markets may be preferable to supply-side solutions that are not viable or sustainable in the long-run. For the water storage and transportation infrastructure that still exists, water markets may shift the financial burden of maintenance from government agencies to private sellers and buyers that participate in water markets.

== Role of institutions ==
Empirical research established that outcomes of long-term sustainability and successful management of common pool resources (CPR) depend on the governing institutions involved, and that no single type of institution or management system uniformly manages common pool resources optimally across all scenarios.

A CPR is "a natural or man-made resource system sufficiently large as to make it costly (but not impossible) to exclude beneficiaries from obtaining benefits from its use". Water is inherently a common pool resource; however it takes on qualities of a private good when property rights are assigned and its consumption becomes both rival and excludable by a water rights holder. Still, water is not a pure private good when property rights are assigned because non-water rights holding beneficiaries can access water upstream. Irrigation water will also percolate and recycle back to the stream so non-water rights holding beneficiaries downstream will benefit from return flows. Thus, water retains certain common pool resource qualities even in a water trading market and must be managed as such.

In the world of common pool resources, an appropriator is a person who withdraws from the resource system, providers are agents who arrange the provision of a CPR, and producers construct, repair, or take action to ensure long terms sustenance of a CPR system. Also bearing on water trading markets, Garrett Hardin suggested common pool resources will terminate in a "tragedy of the commons", where all appropriators will continue to consume common pool resources to maximize their individual utility without considering social utility or cost: "Ruin is the destination toward which all men rush, each pursuing his own best interest in a society that believes in the freedom of the commons".

To redress this, one traditional scheme for common pool resource management is a "Leviathan" strategy, in which a central authority (like government) must enforce rules, and coerce and punish appropriators as necessary to obey resource rules; however a large enforcer cannot catch all offenders or obtain complete information so the Leviathan strategy is not a perfect solution. The second traditional scheme for common pool resource management is privatization, in which resources are tangibly divided and exclusively managed and consumed by individual entities. However, privatization is not a perfect solution because it erroneously assumes when the resource pool is divided, all resultant units have equal value.

As an alternative, Elinor Ostrom posits common pool resources are embedded in complex, social-ecological systems and can be managed by nested or polycentric public enterprises, where institutions at different scales (e.g. national to local hydrologic basin) horizontally and vertically collaborate to sustainably manage a common pool resource. External enforcers do not necessarily need to monitor and enforce penalties; rather, participants can internally monitor appropriations and levy sanctions. Also, those internal actors who know best about costs and benefits of local resource appropriation participate in management. Case studies below provide examples of the role of institutions in specific water markets, however the combination of institutions involved in water allocation distribution will carry unique capacities and constraints.

== Complications in water trading markets ==
Impediments to the development of water markets include the fact that water is largely a public good, and water rights rest with a governing body while individuals essentially have "use" rights. In addition, water is not a standard commodity, rather the water supply is stochastic and flows through complex natural and manmade systems. Thin markets with few participants can result from fluctuations in water supply. Transaction costs for water trades can be high because of the need to physically transport the water and the required administrative approvals, which may not be given because of externalities to third parties. Additionally, institutional features affect transaction costs, such as the structure of the water district, the water rationing mechanism, and other rules such as return-flow requirements. These institutional structures have been observed to form in the early stages of a project and to resist change, because investments that are often irreversible are made by stakeholders and third parties based upon these institutions.

=== Third party effects ===
Third party effects of water trading can be positive or negative and will occur when the benefits or costs of a trade accrue to persons besides the buyer and seller involved in a water right trade. Examples of third party effects include:

- Unreliable supply: Relates to the probability a water rights holder will receive expected allocation in a given water year. This probability of receipt is dependent on natural variability of water supply (e.g. drought, irregular rainfall), governing institutions that manage water allocation, storage and conveyance losses (e.g. from evaporation or seepage), and access to return flows.
- Delayed delivery: Relates to the capacity of water storage and transportation infrastructure and the fact such infrastructure are congestible goods. During peak demand times, infrastructure may not have the capacity to store or deliver water demanded by all users in the moment they demand it. However, because water demand is seasonal (e.g. greater demand in hotter or drier months), it may not be cost-effective to augment infrastructure to meet peak demand level year round. Thus, some users may not receive their water allocation when they need it most.
- Unaccounted costs of storage and/or delivery Again, the time of year, location, and elevation are important because water is non-compressible (unlike something like natural gas) and cannot be cheaply stored or transported long distances or elevations.
- Water quality: Return flows can improve or reduce water quality depending on the location of the origin and endpoint of water traded.
- Fishery degradation: Reduced flows from water allocated offstream can negatively impact fishery health.
- Area-of-Origin effect: Relates to a chain-reaction of decreased local economic activity and a diminished tax base in the geographic area of water traded when water traded lessens the agricultural or industrial water rights holder's economic activity. Academic consensus is that the area-of-origin effect exists, but the magnitude of its impact ranges and is widely debated.

=== Barriers to trade ===
The following factors may impede trading in a water market:

- High infrastructure costs or constraints: A great deal of physical infrastructure is required to move water long distances to reallocate it to its most valued use from a seller to a buyer, and allow markets to form and succeed. Most often the capital to build elaborate canal and ditch infrastructure is provided and maintained by a government entity.
- High transaction costs: The transaction cost of trading in a water market is the sum of the cost of obtaining information, search cost of finding willing traders, negotiation cost of achieving mutually beneficial trades, cost of effecting and registering trades, and cost of enforcing trade contracts. Increasing the geographic range of the trade and number of stakeholders involved tends to increase the transaction cost of the trade.
- Legal barriers: In the United States, federal regulations under as the Endangered Species Act, Public Trust Doctrine, or Clean Water Act, which can require minimum flows to protect a species or maintain water quality, may prevent trades offstream (for example, see court protection of the Hypomesus transpacificus in California.
- System of water rights: If there is a rationing system in which senior rights users get all of their allotment before junior rights users get any of theirs under drought conditions (priority system), there is little incentive for senior users to conserve if they can't easily trade water to other users. This complicates trading because heterogeneous rights must be quantified and priced for each trade, and is less adaptable to short run changes in supply.
- Political and social barriers: In order for a water market to realize success, multiple factions within society must be able to view water markets as serving social values and objectives. Given the array of societal factions though, sometimes with competing values or objectives, water market approval needed across multiple groups may be difficult to achieve. Stakeholders involved in the market must agree on and adhere to rules governing trade for effective and efficient Coasean bargaining to occur. Elected political leadership may be unwilling to support water markets, support trade-enabling laws, or raise water prices to reflect scarcity conditions if constituents disapprove. Political leadership must also mutually define desired policy outcomes of water markets and water market administration must be feasible and sustainable to achieve the desired policy outcome. Finally, although water allocation dedicated to environmental use is increasingly recognized, stigma against "nonconsumptive" water use may persist in communities that have historically viewed water left instream as wasteful because it does not contribute to economic welfare.

=== Other considerations ===
- Equity: Besides resource allocation principled on economic efficiency, water allocation based on social equity concerns of fairness and water access for all, irrespective of individual ability to pay, is another consideration in water distribution. Distributing water to achieve social equity will exclude economic efficiency if government provides subsidies, free services, or administratively sets water pricing to make water available to those not able to pay market price for water. Equity is also a concern for water markets in the sense participating buyers and sellers should perceive equal opportunity gains in a transaction (which theoretically should occur if water is priced according to the equimarginal principle).
- Pricing: Marginal price in a water market should reflect parity between the marginal willingness to pay of all consumers in the market (i.e. the marginal social demand) and the marginal social cost of provision (that accounts for private costs, externalities to third parties, storage and conveyance costs, and resource scarcity). However, in practice, water is often administratively priced by management institutions, who are reluctant to raise prices to reflect water scarcity, so water is under-priced and over-consumed. Because administrative prices are not determined by market conditions, they do not automatically respond to changes in long-term or short-term supply, and can be set at a variety of levels (such as short-run marginal cost or long-run marginal cost, with varying assumptions about fixed or variable demand and costs) that are not Pareto efficient. One challenge in quantifying an accurate social marginal price involves difficulty in measuring the price elasticity of water. Determining price elasticity for the agricultural or industrial sector can be difficult because water use might not be metered or water is free. The marginal value of instream demand requires nonmarket valuation techniques such as recreational demand models, contingent valuation or hedonic housing models. Yet as the diversion of water offstream increases, the marginal value of water left instream will increase and nonmarket valuation techniques will only reflect a static price. Municipal water demand elasticity is also difficult to measure because historically municipal water is under-priced and set at the long-run marginal cost of supply.
- Evaluation: Trade volumes may not tell the whole story about the efficiency or importance of a water market. A low number of trades does not necessarily indicate an inefficient water market, nor does a high number indicate efficiency. Actual trade volumes have been relatively low in studied water markets. Outside of the U.S., in Australia, 51 inter-state trades took place between 2000 and 2002. Yet within the Australian state of New South Wales, even though water trading has existed since the 1980s as a way to address droughts, the market is still thin and exists mostly within the irrigation sector. In Chile most trades take place in Santiago or in the desert north. In the U.S., between 1990 and 2000 in 19 western states there were 1,065 sales and 552 leases of water rights, but the majority of the sales were in Colorado in relation to the Big Thompson Dam Project. In general, efficient water markets trade in homogeneous water shares, many buyers and sellers, ease of entry and exit, and low transaction costs, all of which depend upon the particular market's structure.

== Alternatives to water trading markets ==
Where water markets are either not viable or desired, the following mechanisms may be used to allocate scarce water resources:

- Administrative transfers (also called "public allocation")
- Forfeiture or abandonment of water rights, as determined by governing institutional law
- Government exercise of eminent domain
- Legal challenges to existing water allocation
- Legislative settlement
- Reallocation of water via redesign of large-scale water projects
- Marginal-cost pricing
- User-based allocation

== Water trading by country ==
=== Australia ===
The first time that water access entitlements were separated from land title in Australia was in 1983, when South Australia introduced a permanent water trading scheme. Like many other countries, Australia's irrigation sector was subject to centralised control for more than a century. Many irrigation settlements were placed in inappropriate parts of the landscape where the risks of waterlogging, land salinisation or river salinisation were high and returns from production were low. Farm sizes on irrigated settlements were also initially based on non-commercial criteria like ‘the home maintenance area’ (the maximum area necessary to support one family – as judged by government). Irrigators were in this way condemned to a frugal existence from the start. Changing commodity markets and above all changing irrigation technologies amplified these initial errors and left Australian irrigation with difficult adjustment problems.

Australia's institutions, and rhetoric, are now geared to the market with the benefits of trade between ‘willing sellers’ and ‘willing buyers’ extolled by policymakers. Irrigators who can generate higher returns are now buying water from those who believe they can make more money by selling their water entitlements rather than using them. Nonetheless, the instinct for central planning lives on and some policy makers are tempted to favour those crops deemed to produce high gross values per megalitre when economics teaches that it is marginal valuations that are important. This distinction is critical because many ostensibly water efficient crops have limited markets. Rather than make judgements about what crops should be grown on farms, economic orthodoxy is to let individual irrigators make their own judgements about whether they can profit from their investment in water entitlements. Australian governments mostly shy away from ‘picking winners’. Nevertheless, in popular discussion, there is considerable emphasis on the crops being grown when what matters most for public policy is the amount of water taken from rivers and any externalities associated with irrigation.

In 1994, Australia's National Water Commission took the step in unbundling property rights, separating land from water rights. Upon doing this, steps were taken to increase the efficiency of water distribution. By 2010, the water rights market was valued at A$2.8 billion. Various kinds of market intermediaries facilitate the trade of water, including water brokers, water exchanges and message boards. Decentralized markets are created such that one water exchange does not process all trades. A trade may occur between a private buyer and seller, through a broker or through an exchange. Some brokers may use an exchange to locate buyers or sellers.

The Murray–Darling Basin is one area in Australia studied for its water trading schemes. The Murray–Darling Basin receives approximately 90% of the region's water. In the 1990s, the Australian Government has shifted its emphasis from building dams and subsidizing water from area farmers to the establishment of prices and trading within the water market. Trading for these rights occur across Australian states, with caps being set for each area to assure that water is not being over-extracted from the Basin to another region. This method operates on estimated net benefits, including the return flow to the Basin. Additionally, this water is traded with the full cognizance of Australia's highly varying climate. As the second driest continent on Earth, the water allocations are more valuable when distributed as seasonal allocation or temporary trades, to ensure that, should it be necessary, water can be returned to the Murray–Darling Basin region.

The Water Services Association of Australia operates on a volume-metering system. This means that market players do not simply apply to possess the water rights, but instead they are paying for the quantity of water they consume. Yet, recent reports raise concerns regarding over-allocation and the confusion between environmental outcomes and economic efficiency.

The sustainability of the present system for water marketing may be affected by the structure and the conditionalities of marketable rights. While in the US water marketing is limited to effectively used rights, and to historical water consumption, Australian water marketing accepts the marketing of sleeper rights that have not been utilized.

=== Chile ===
The Chilean system is characterized by a strongly free-market approach, and has been controversial both in Chile and in international circles. As part of the water resources management in Chile, under the 1981 Water Code (water law), water rights are private property, separate from land, can be freely traded, are subject to minimal state regulation and are regulated by civil law. Under the Code, the Chilean state grants the existing water users the property rights for surface water and groundwater without any additional fee. Any new or unallocated water rights are auctioned and then can be sold or transferred at price. During the 1990s, the World Bank and the Inter-American Development Bank actively promoted the Chilean system as an example of effective and efficient water resources management. Other institutions, such as Eclac (Economic Commission for Latin America and the Caribbean, United Nations), questioned the structure and conditionalities of Chilean water rights, and consequently the resulting market for water rights, on grounds of efficiency and equity. As Australia, Chile allows the marketing of unused water rights. While the US marketing systems limit transactions to historically consumed waters, according to effective and beneficial utilization, Chile allows the transaction of nominal entitlements, without limitation to effective use and consumption. Water rights are not forfeited if not utilized. This resulted in the monopolization of water rights on one hand, and on the trading of nominal entitlements on the other, with negative impacts on sustainability and third parties. A Water Law Reform (2005) partially amended the system, but water marketing in some areas is still affected by sustainability problems. Sustainability may also be affected by public subsidies to irrigation, which are not environmentally assessed. Although the Chilean model has been recommended for adoption in other Latin American countries, none has yet accepted it in its original form. The proposed transfer of one element of the Chilean model played a role in the 2000 water war in Cochabamba, Bolivia; that which awarded ownership of all water resources to the new concessionaire, International Water. This legal change meant that existing users, which included peasant farmers and small-scale water supply networks, were immediately illegalized, resulting in widespread angry protests.

In Chile, opinion over the effectiveness and the fairness of the water markets model is deeply divided. Specific concerns that have arisen include the hoarding of water rights without using them for speculative purposes and the lack of state regulation to ensure that the market works properly and fairly. Some researchers have argued that the model does deliver economic benefits, but other evidence shows that the system does not work well in practice and that poorer water users (such as peasant farmers) have less access to water rights. Some of these concerns led to the amendment of the Water Code in 2005.

=== Iran ===
Iran has been in the throes of a water crisis for the past few decades. Population growth, mismanagement in water resources and changes in precipitation patterns are a few causes to name that made Iran to start different coping strategies including water trading to deal with its water crisis.

=== United Kingdom ===
Water trading in the UK is open since 2001. Currently, only the trading of water rights (trading of licenses) is authorised. Some changes in the policies are being investigated by the Environment Agency.

=== United States ===
Water trading in the United States varies by state, according to the state's water code, system of water rights, and governmental bodies involved in regulating water trading. Water trading is practiced more in western states, where states historically have followed a water rights system of prior appropriation, and vast regions are arid so water is naturally scarce. Presented here are some cases of water trading and relevant regulatory rules and bodies, however these cases are not exhaustive.

==== Arizona ====
Arizona follows the prior appropriation doctrine for determining water rights. There are three categories of tradable rights in Arizona: surface water rights under Common Law Rights, surface water rights under Statutory Rights, and groundwater rights created by Arizona's 1980 Groundwater Code. The former two surface water rights pertain to any surface water in Arizona excluding flows in the Colorado River (Colorado River water rights are governed extraneously, by the Colorado River Compact). Specifically, appropriated surface water can be: "Waters of all sources, flowing in streams, canyons, ravines or other natural channels, or in definite underground channels, whether perennial or intermittent, floodwaters, wastewater, or surplus water, and of lakes, ponds and springs on the surface" (A.R.S. §45-101). Common Law Rights apply to surface water diversions appropriated prior to the creation of Arizona's 1919 Public Water Code and are senior rights. Statutory Rights apply to any appropriation claimed after 1919, in which case the claimant must apply for and receive a permit from the Arizona Department of Water Resource (ADWR) before diverting claimed surface water. Rights holders must apply appropriated water to beneficial use (recognized as domestic, municipal, irrigation, stockwatering, power, mining, recreation, wildlife and fish, or groundwater recharge) or risk forfeiture of rights (which occurs if water is not applied to beneficial use for 5 or more consecutive years). Arizona permits transfer of surface water rights, however there are maximum limits to the amount of water transferred and temporal duration of the transfer (A.R.S. §45-1002), and transfers are subject to review and approval by the ADWR. In the case of transfers to instream flows to benefit fish, wildlife, or recreation, rights holders may follow a "sever and transfer" process, by which the holder permanently transfers the water right to the State of Arizona or a political subdivision (as trustees of instream flows), pending approval of the ADWR. This type of transfer will preserve the priority status of the water right, so that if the right transferred is a senior right, the benefiting instream flow will receive its water allocation before junior rights holders in the case of a water shortage. This transfer process is boon to ecosystem health and recreational value because wildlife and fish were not recognized as beneficial uses until 1941 and 1962, respectively. Groundwater rights transfers are more restricted relative to surface water. The 1980 Arizona Groundwater Code created jurisdictions called "Active Management Areas" (AMA) in parts of the state with high water demand, such as Phoenix, Tucson, and Prescott. Groundwater rights owners living in places outside of AMAs are entitled to a "reasonable" quantity of pumped groundwater that can be applied to beneficial use without waste. Groundwater rights holders outside of AMAs may transfer rights under certain conditions and are rarely permitted to transfer groundwater outside the hydrologic basin. Groundwater transfers within AMAs are also permissible, but are even more restricted, and groundwater regulation in AMAs is different and much stricter than regulation outside of AMAs. Legal rules governing water exchanges in Arizona are codified in Title 45, Chapter 4, of the Arizona Revised Statutes. Water transfers within Arizona are most common in the Phoenix AMA.

==== California ====
At its statehood (1850), California adopted the system of English Common Law riparian rights, but with the advent of the California Gold Rush and eventual abundance of water claims by miners, California adopted the appropriative rights system as well one year later. California also observes Pueblo rights, a remnant of Spanish law in modern-day California, which allows an entire town to claim right to water. There are other rights California observes, such as prescriptive rights and federal reserved rights, but riparian and prior appropriation rights are the two prominent types of rights in the state. Finally, California has observed the doctrine of "reasonable use" for groundwater since 1903. Because of the many water rights California recognizes, its water rights scheme is a considered a "plural system". Bearing on water trading, because California adopted riparian rights before appropriative rights, riparian rights have priority over senior appropriative rights. California's 1914 Water Commission Act established a permit system for surface water appropriative rights and created an agency (that would eventually become the California State Water Resources Control Board (SWRCB)), to administer those permits. All water application must meet beneficial use requirements (California Water Code §100) (beneficial use includes aquaculture, domestic use, fire protection, fish and wildlife, crop frost protection, heat control, industrial use, irrigation, mining, municipal, power, recreation, stockwatering, and water quality control) but post-1914 appropriative rights are subject to more scrutiny and regulation by the SWRCB. By law (California Water Code §102), water in California is public property (and therefore a common pool resource); water rights only entitle the holder to use of water, not ownership of water. In fact, §104 and §105 of the California Water Code expressly state the people have a "paramount interest in the use of all water", the State may control surface and underground water for public use or public protection, and that the State should develop water for "the greatest public benefit". Because of these provisions, and the characteristic of water as a common pool resource, California law requires state agencies to review and approve independent market transfers on behalf of the public. California's Division of Water Rights keep record of water appropriation and use, and the SWRCB reviews and issues permits, adjudicates rights, investigates complaints, and approves temporary transfers (duration is no longer than 1 year) of post-1914 appropriative rights. Injury to other legal water users, unreasonable effects on fish and wildlife, and unreasonable effects on the overall economy in the country from which water is transferred are legally obligated items the SWRCB must consider when reviewing a transfer. Chapter 7 of the California Water Code defines water transfers, declares voluntary water transfers results in efficient use of water that alleviates water shortages, saves capital outlay development costs, and conserves water and energy, and explicitly requires government to assist in voluntary transfers. Chapter 10.5 of the California Water Code states provisions for the process of water transfers for temporary (§1725–1732) and long-term exchanges (over 1 year in duration) (§1735–1737). Long-term exchanges can be subject to review by the Department of Fish and Game as well.

There are hundreds of water transfers in California each year, the majority of which are short-term transfers between agricultural users in the same hydrologic basin. Intra-basin transfers have a relatively low transaction cost because the local jurisdiction water district often owns the water rights, and so is the only body that needs to approve transfers between its farming members (i.e. the SWRCB is not involved). Water transfers also help meet the instream demands; for example, those of the state's Environmental Water Account. Finally, in officially declared emergency situations, the California Department of Water Resources opens a California Drought Water Bank, which buys surplus water allocations from northern California water rights holders and sells and transports those allocations to drought-stricken areas in southern California.

==== Colorado ====
Surface water rights in Colorado are administered by the Colorado Division of Water Resources (CDWR) and by the water courts, which are district courts that only hear water matters. To get a surface water right, individuals submit an application to the water courts, and must show intent to divert the water for beneficial use – if there is no opposition, the right will be signed into a decree. The system is prior appropriation and priority based, with some priority dates going back to the 1890s. Transfers of rights require that there will be no adverse effect on other senior or junior rights holders, the result of which is that only the amount of water used consumptively in the past can be transferred. The CDWR administers the river water up to the head gate of a ditch that diverts water from the Colorado River, where a ditch company then controls the allocation of water to shareholders.

Federal projects can overrule this state system, and this is true for the Colorado-Big Thompson Project (CBT). The CBT Dam is a Bureau of Reclamation irrigation project where a water market has developed, and is based on a proportional rights system. This market has been in operation since the early 1960s, and has well-developed infrastructure to move water within the area of service. There are market prices, brokers, short term rentals and permanent leases of water in this system, and trades within the agricultural sector and between the agricultural and municipal and industrial sectors. Water rights are homogeneous and trades are in allotments of the use of 1 acre-foot (1,200 m^{3}) (for 1 year) of the 310,000 acre-feet (380,000,000 m^{3}) per year of water supplied by the CBT; and each acre-foot is a tradable allotment. Water rights are thus well defined, and understood by traders. Supplies are also reliable, and the delivery of water assured- users know what they are getting. The CBT was developed to supply water that is supplemental to a users main supply (to reduce variability in supplies), so in wet years the quota is cut back proportionally for all shareholders to save for drier years. Similarly, if there is less than 310,000 acre-feet (380,000,000 m^{3}) available for a given year, all supplies are cut back proportionally. Additionally, conserved water can be transferred to another use, which is not the case in prior appropriation systems. Water can also be rented to users outside the district through exchanges and replacements and internal ditch companies also trade non-CBT water, though transaction costs are higher for these. Rental prices are less than allotments, because of the higher risk of unavailability, and make up 30% of transactions.

The system is administered by the Northern Colorado Water Conservation District (NCWCD) which was created by the Water Conservancy Act, and it operates independently of the CDWR. The NCWCD puts parties in contact to facilitate trade and reviews applications which must be submitted to the district to make sure water will be for beneficial use as well as to guard against speculative purchases. The transfer process takes 4 to 6 weeks, is relatively simple and straightforward, and does not require the approval of a state engineer, significantly reducing the time and costs involved. Sometimes auctions will be advertised, but usually are negotiated between traders directly. Transaction costs are lower in the CBT which has only the NCWCD as its governance structure to contract with the Bureau of Reclamation for both agricultural and urban users. Also, in contrast to other systems, impacts to downstream third parties do not have to be considered since there are no required downstream return flows and there is not a no-injury rule in place.

The system is well regarded as a model for other markets and credited with having allowed northern Colorado to adjust to short and long term shifts in water demand and supply. In 1962, irrigators owned 82% water allotments, down to 64% in 1982, and 55% in 1992, but still were able to use 71% of the water in 1992 through water leasebacks. Between 1970 and 1993 there were 2,698 transactions of one-third of the water allotments to another use or for use at a different location.

==== New Mexico ====
The State of New Mexico has entrusted its water rights governing to a State-appointed position, that of the Water Engineer. The role of this position is to not only facilitate the exchanges of water rights that occur, but also monitor the aquifer levels as resources are consumed. In 2003, the state of New Mexico implemented a Water Plan, which sought to protect the allotment of water rights, but also consider the associated water supply and quality, the relationships between sellers and buyers, State requirements, and promotion of future investment in infrastructure. New Mexico must be responsible for the management of its own resource supply, as the inability to do so will require the surrender of authority to the federal level of administration. To ensure effective guidance in sales and trades, many state departments and commissions are engaged in the efforts. Each of these parties is delegated roles and responsibilities aimed towards best planning and management of State and Regional water exchanges. The New Mexico Interstate Stream Commission and the Office of the State Engineer are two leading parties, but included in this council are the New Mexico Environment Department, the Water Quality Control Commission, the New Mexico Acequia Commission, and the Water Trust Board, among others. These groups work in conjunction with one another to ensure water right implementation, potential pollutants, developing databases and information systems, and fulfill other roles that lead to efficient use of New Mexico's water resources. The state of New Mexico honors the system of prior-appropriation water rights. In this "first in time, first in right" system, many of the original recipients of water access rights were Pueblos and Tribes. As sovereign states, these groups are entitled to their senior rights, which are then governed on a federal level rather than state. Because of the uniqueness of these rights, any policy decisions that may affect these Tribes and Pueblos must be presented by the State for discussion with these parties. The state of New Mexico mandates that any rights with a common hydrological source be formally adjudicated through a court proceeding, documenting the full legal and physical quantification of the rights. This is accomplished with the purpose of assisting the State Water Engineer in allocating water allotments across the spread of State demands and those with senior rights. The rights held by Pueblos and Tribes must also be adjudicated to establish the legal parameters of their water access. Under the McCarran Amendment, these rights must be defined and quantified under federal law in order to be evaluated as part of the stream-associated water rights administration. Because of the nearly complete allocation of surface waters in New Mexico, efforts have been made to increase the water supply available to the expanding needs of the State. In order to do this, groundwater is reserved in aquifers that are connected to rivers throughout the state. Reclaiming these stores would diminish the river flows which would thus reduce the water available to senior rights holders. The solution here is the purchase and retirement of these senior surface rights. This will begin a new emphasis on the groundwater resources that have been stored for future access. The Office of the State Engineer occupies a critical role in New Mexico's water trading system. This administrator will establish a prior appropriation assessment of water rights in part with a priority administration plan of action The State Engineer is provided with funding for investments in technology, such as water measuring and metering, GIS units, surface and groundwater models, and manuals. To aid in the fulfillment of these and additional requirements of the State Water Engineer, New Mexico has recently implemented an "active resource management" plan. In this platform, a state-appointed staff is assigned roles in identifying, measuring, and metering water rights, facilitating transfers, and appointing district water masters. Water masters operate within established water districts in administering rights as necessary. Each basin team includes a project manager, hydrologist, attorney, communication manager, personnel manager, and technical support staff. The full responsibilities of the active resource management plan along with the Office of the State Water Engineer are diagrammed in the 2003 Water Plan, as well as the 2006 Progress Report and 2008 Review and Proposed Update. The ideals of this proposal are clearly identified and accompanied by methods of execution and public opinion. While comparatively young, this program is aggressively seeking out efficient allocation and use of New Mexico's water supply. New Mexico considers all water to be public property. Right to use, however, is a possession that may be purchased or leased. Once allocated to a party, failure to put to beneficial use for period of time (commonly 4 years) may lead to rights being reclaimed by the State. Upon reclamation, these rights may then be sold or leased to another interested party. The rights may be obtained through application of a permit through the Office of the State or through a personal water attorney.

==== Texas ====
Overall, the water rights situation in Texas is similar to that of the states where water rights have been clearly defined. Texas Supreme Court's decision in Day McDaniels vs. Edwards Aquifer Authority in support of the right of capture in 2012, set the foundation for the trading of the ground water rights (surface water is regulated through a separate mechanism). Texas Water Exchange, founded in 2013, is the only public marketplace for trading ground water rights in the state, and, currently, in the US. Traditional methods of trading water rights through water attorneys also still exist.

== Sample of economic applications of policy tools ==
=== Coase theorem ===
Between producers and consumers, there is the possibility of externalities arising. These may take the form of damages to either party, one of whom may or may not have the property rights concerning the externality. Under the assumptions of perfect information, both parties being price-takers, costless court systems, profit and utility maximization by producers and consumers respectively, no income/wealth effects, and no transaction costs, the parties may be able to meet an efficient level of compensation. Although these assumptions are rarely simultaneously met, an arrangement can be made between parties. In the case of water trading, an example occurs when those accessing their water rights infringe on others’ rights of another nature. A Coasean bargaining system would unfold if the damaged parties offered to pay the rights holders to refrain from accessing part of their rights. This payment would fall within the range of the rights-holders lost benefits and the victim's damages. Another example of the Coase Theorem is when a water rights owner pays a land owner to access a body of water on their property. An appropriate price will fall between the cost of damages incurred by the landowners and the benefit to the individual accessing their rights.

=== Pareto efficiency ===
An underlying objective of water trading is to achieve Pareto efficiency. This is the point of water right distribution in which no further allocation can make a party better off without making another party worse off in the same degree. The optimal level of allocation occurs when water is allocated to those who value it most, presuming non-drought years.

=== Pigouvian tax ===
A Pigouvian fee is an emission fee exactly equal to the aggregate marginal damage caused by the emissions when evaluated at the efficient level of pollution. In the case of water trading, the negative externalities frequently manifest in the form of third party damages. When water is displaced, when pipelines are built, or when communities change as result of water trading, each of these is a negative attribute of the water trade. It has been proposed that a means of compensating damaged parties is through a tax associated with water trading. This tax would be embedded in the cost associated with purchasing a short term water transfer and the generated revenue would then accumulate in a designated fund. At the end of the trading year, erred parties would then be permitted to file for compensation based on the nature and severity of the damages.

== See also ==
- Drinking water
- Tap water
- Water law
- Water purification
