= Water law in the United States =

About 1.9 trillion gallons of water are consumed within the Colorado River basin in a typical year, contributing to a severe water shortage and causing states to reach a conservation and resource-sharing agreement with the federal government. Most of the Colorado River basin water used by humans is used to grow feed for livestock—more than four times the amount used for crops for direct human consumption.

Water law in the United States refers to the water resources laws regulating water as a resource in the United States. Beyond issues common to all jurisdictions attempting to regulate water's uses, water law in the United States must contend with:

- Public regulation of waters, including flood control, environmental regulation—state and federal, public health regulation and regulation of fisheries
- The interplay of public and private rights in water, which draws on aspects of eminent domain law and the federal commerce clause powers;
- Water project law: the highly developed law regarding the formation, operation, and finance of public and quasi-public entities which operate local public works of flood control, navigation control, irrigation, and avoidance of environmental degradation; and
- Treaty rights of Native Americans.

The law governing these topics derives from all layers of US law. Some derives from common law principles which have developed over centuries, and which evolve as the nature of disputes presented to courts change. For example, the judicial approach to landowner rights to divert surface waters has changed significantly in the last century as public attitudes about land and water have evolved. Some derives from state statutory law. Some derives from the original public grants of land to the states and from the documents of their origination. Some derives from state, federal, and local regulation of waters through zoning, public health, and other regulation. (Federally recognized tribes may have water rights, but non-federally recognized Indian tribes generally do not.)

== Common law sources of water law ==
The United States inherited the British common law system which develops legal principles through judicial decisions made in the context of disputes between parties. Statutory and constitutional law forms the framework within which these disputes are resolved, to some extent, but decisional law developed through the resolution of specific disputes is the great engine of water law.

At common law any rights to water must be claimed based on a claim against the land over which water flows or rests. A downstream landowner can bring an action against an upstream owner for excessively diminishing the quantity and quality of water arriving at a downstream location.

Water Disputes arise in a number of contexts. When the state, local, or federal government takes private property that has water rights associated with private ownership, the value of that property is significantly affected by its water rights. And, properties located along public waters are quite common, because of the importance of public waters to commerce, the environment, and recreation. These taking cases represent a major source of the law defining the limits of private rights in water and public rights.

A second context for the development of water law arises from disputes among private parties over the extent of their respective water rights; e.g., a landowner upstream seeks to cut off the flow of surface water downstream and appropriate these surface waters for its exclusive use. The downstream owner claims that the upstream landowner has appropriated water that belongs to its property. A downstream owner seeks to stop the flow of excess water that will otherwise flood its land thereby increasing flood damage on the upstream owner. Each party claims that the other's conduct interferes with the rights associated with their respective ownership of the property.

The third context for water law arises from disputes regarding flooding or other invasions of private property by water. In these cases, the private party claims that private or public actions have damaged its private property, and the court must decide the nature of the respective rights of public and private parties arising from the alteration of the hydrology of a watershed.

It is important to recognize that there are both private and public 'rights' associated with the water, but that ownership of the water under common law is likened to claiming to "own" sunlight. Water must be legally appropriated before it is 'owned', and regulations on appropriation are typically controlled by government agencies and case laws. Who has domain over water is typically based on who owns the underlying soils, but Local, State and Federal regulations often limit the amount and type of uses to which water can be used in order to protect downstream users rights. At some point, before the water reaches the ocean it amasses sufficient size that the underlying lands become owned by the Nation or State in which they are situated. At this point (defined as the upper limits of navigation) individual rights give way to the superior rights of the public.

== Riparian rights ==
The Eastern states (all those east of Texas, except Mississippi), follow the riparian doctrine, which permits anyone whose land has frontage on a body of water to use water from it. These states were the first settled by Europeans (and therefore most influenced by English law) and have the most available water. The Supreme Court has explained the evolution of riparian principles in United States v. Gerlach Livestock (1950)

In the middle of the Eighteenth Century, English common law included a body of water doctrine known as riparian rights. As long ago as the Institutes of Justinian, running waters, like the air and the sea, were res communes -- things common to all and property of none. Such was the doctrine spread by civil-law commentators and embodied in the Napoleonic code and in Spanish law. This conception passed into the common law. From these sources, but largely from civil-law sources, the inquisitive and powerful minds of Chancellor Kent and Mr. Justice Story drew in generating the basic doctrines of American water law.

The riparian concept developed fully in those portions of the United States where lands were amply watered by rainfall. United States v. Gerlach, supra. The Court's decision continues:

The primary natural asset was land, and the run-off in streams or rivers was incidental. Since access to flowing waters was possible only over private lands, access became a right annexed to the shore. The law followed the principle of equality which requires that the corpus of flowing water become no one's property and that, aside from rather limited use for domestic and agricultural purposes by those above, each riparian owner has the right to have the water flow down to him in its natural volume and channels unimpaired in quality. The riparian system does not permit water to be reduced to possession so as to become property which may be carried away from the stream for commercial or nonriparian purposes. In working out details of this egalitarian concept, the several states made many variations, each seeking to provide incentives for development of its natural advantages.

A number of rights may be listed as riparian rights. One court, in McLafferty v. St. Aubiin, 500 N.W.2d 165 (Minn. App. 1993), has listed the following:

Riparian rights are generally described as the rights to use and enjoy the profits and advantages of the water. See78 Am.Jur.2d Waters § 263 (1975). The riparian owner has a right to make such use of the lake over its entire surface, in common with all other abutting owners, provided such use is reasonable and does not unduly interfere with the exercise of similar rights on the part of other abutting owners. Johnson v. Siefert, 100 N.W.2d 689, 697 (1960). Riparian rights include the right to build and maintain, for private or public use, wharves, piers, and landings on the riparian land and extending into the water. State v. Korrer, 148 N.W. 617, 622 (1914). They also include such rights as hunting, fishing, boating, sailing, irrigating, and growing and harvesting wild rice.

— In re Application of Central Baptist Theological Seminary, 370 N.W.2d 642, 646 (Minn.App.1985), pet. for rev. denied (Minn. Sept. 19, 1985).

In addition to these rights, riparian rights may include the right to access the water, the right to use or consume, the right to use the ground of non-public waters, and the right to use land that is added to the extent of the adjoining property by accretion.

== Prior appropriation ==
Most western states, naturally drier, generally follow the prior appropriation doctrine, which gives a water right to whoever first puts water to beneficial use. Colorado, where the prior appropriation doctrine first developed, was generally looked to as the model by other Western states that adopted the prior appropriation doctrine. Water law in the western United States is defined by state constitutions (e.g., Colorado, New Mexico), statutes, and case law. Each state exhibits variations upon the basic principles of the prior appropriation doctrine. Texas and the states directly north of it; the West Coast states, and Mississippi have a mixture of systems. Hawaii uses a form of riparian rights, and Alaska uses appropriation-based rights.

In some states surface water (e.g., lakes, rivers, or springs), is treated differently from ground water (i.e., underground water that is extracted by drilling wells). However, in other states surface and ground water are managed conjunctively. For example, in New Mexico, surface and ground water have been managed together since the 1950s. This trend comes from a growing scientific understanding of the formerly mysterious behavior of underground water systems. For instance, gradual contamination of some water supplies with salt has been explained with the knowledge that drawing water from a well creates a gradual seepage into the well area, potentially contaminating it and surrounding areas with seawater from a nearby coast. Such knowledge is useful for understanding the effects of human activity on water supplies but can also create new sources of conflict.

A variety of federal, state, and local laws govern water rights. One issue unique to America is the law of water with respect to American Indians. Tribal water rights are a special case because they fall under neither the riparian system nor the appropriation system but are outlined in the Winters v. United States decision. Indian water rights do not apply to non-federally recognized tribes.

== Federally recognized Indian tribes and water law ==
=== Tribes within reservations ===
Reserved Native American water rights are commonly known as 'Winters rights, determined by the Winters and Arizona v. California cases.

1. Rights are defined by federal law
2. Establishment of a reservation by treaty, statute or executive order includes an implied reservation of water rights in sources within or bordering the reservation
3. Based on date, users with prior appropriation dates under state law take precedence over the Native American rights, but those with later dates are subordinate
4. Quantity of water reserved is the amount sufficient to irrigate all irrigable land on the reservation
5. Rights are not lost due to non-use

Indian tribes have sole rights to water only after they have determined practicable irrigable acreage (PIA). According to legal scholar Bruce Duthu, tribes must prove that the requested amount of water is needed for their land and construct facilities to save it.

=== Winters v. United States ===
Winters v. United States (1908) involved the Fort Belknap Indian Reservation, created by the 1888 agreement with the federal government. This agreement made one boundary of the reservation a part of the Milk River, but it did not mention water rights to that river. Afterwards, non-Indian settlers off the reservation constructed dams in the river that interfered with the tribe's agricultural use of the water. The settlers claimed appropriative rights after the reservation had been established, but before the tribe began to use the water. The Supreme Court held that the water rights were automatically reserved by the 1888 agreement that created the reservation. The Court assumed the Indians would not reserve lands for farming without also reserving the water that would make such farming possible.

=== Arizona v. California ===
In Arizona v. California (1963), the Court had to determine water rights of tribes along the Colorado River whose reservations were established by both statute and executive order. The Court held that the statute or executive order could not have meant to establish reservations without also reserving the use of water for the productivity of the tribes. Therefore, the Court held the water rights were effectively reserved at the time of the reservation's creation. Arizona v. California also concerned the quantity of water reserved. The Supreme Court ruled that the tribes were entitled to enough water to irrigate all the "practicable irrigable acreage" on the reservation.

==== Non-Native American purchaser's rights ====
1. A Native American allotee is entitled to the share of the reservation's water that is needed to irrigate their land.

2. When a Native American sells their allotment to a non-Native American, the purchaser acquires the allotment's reserved water rights.

3. The priority date of those rights remains the date when the reservation was created.

4. Non-Native American allottees can lose their water rights to non-use.

==== Winters rights as property ====
Winters rights coming from a treaty or statute creating a reservation are property to which title is recognized. When a reservation is created by an executive order, "the tribal title is unrecognized for Fifth Amendment purposes."

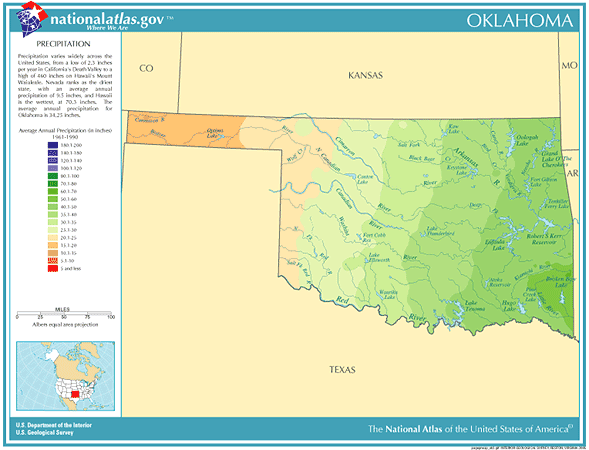
The Arkansas River flows through the northeastern part of Oklahoma

=== Tribes not within reservations ===
==== Cherokee water rights ====
This court case defined the place of Native American tribes in the modern court. It involved water rights in the case of the Cherokee nation. Winters Rights do not apply to the Cherokee Nation because there is no actual Cherokee reservation. During this July 2009 proceeding, the state of Oklahoma sought monetary damages and injunctive relief against the Tyson Foods Corporation, due to the injury to the Illinois River watershed from poultry waste. The defendant, Tyson Foods, Inc., moved to dismiss the case because the Cherokee Nation was not involved, though they were a required party. The ruling on this motion helped determine the standing of the Cherokee Nation concerning water rights in their region.

The Court, in order to determine if case could proceed without the involvement of the Cherokee Nation, applied Rule 19. The first step in this process determined if the Cherokee Nation was a required party, meaning that complete relief could not be offered, their absence would impede a person's ability to protect the interest, or more obligations could occur due to the interest. In this court ruling, it was determined that the Cherokee Nation has substantial interests, such as seen in their Environmental Quality Code which shows interest in protecting the Illinois River and vindicating any pollution. The Cherokee Nation also has an interest in recovering remedies for any injuries, in regulating and taxing things concerning the environment of the Cherokee Nation. Furthermore, the Cherokee Nation claims their water rights derived from federal law and treaties were unaffected by statehood. In entering into cooperative agreements with tribes, which would be necessary to resolve the issue of water rights (especially in the case of the Cherokee Nation and Tyson Foods) the state of Oklahoma must meet explicit requirements.

1. The Governor is authorized, as well as any other named designee, and is allowed to enter into cooperative agreements on behalf of the state with federally recognized tribes within that state if an issue of mutual interest is being addressed.

2. Approval of the Secretary of the Interior is required if the cooperative agreement dealing with issues of mutual interest involves trust responsibilities.

3. Any cooperative agreement specified and authorized by paragraph 1 that involves the surface/groundwater resources of the states or which in whole or in part apportions the ownership of those resources, shall become effective if the Oklahoma Legislature grants consent to authorize such cooperative agreement.

The United States historically promised the Five Civilized Tribes that their lands would not be included without their consent in the territorial limits or jurisdiction of a state. This doctrine, known as the Five Tribes Doctrine, according to scholar Jennifer Pelfrey:

Southeast Oklahoma is unique from other tribal reservation areas because of the Five Tribes doctrine. The federal government removed the Five Civilized Tribes to specific unsettled lands within the Indian Territory. At that time it also granted federal land patents to the Five Tribes and the Tribes were authorized to issue tribal patents in the case of a transfer of their tribal land. The doctrine holds that this "permanent homeland" includes rights to all the water within it, not just enough to fulfill the land's purpose, as under the Winters doctrine. In addition, the Supreme Court has held in past decisions that the federal government conveyed specific lands directly to Indian tribes, and that a state that later enveloped tribal land did not inherit rights to the water on that land. The Tribes also point to Oklahoma's 1906 Enabling Act, federal legislation which says that the State Constitution shall not limit the rights held by the Indians of Oklahoma. The Oklahoma State Constitution, as adopted in 1907, further provides that non-Indian inhabitants of the State do not have rights to Indian lands. The Five Tribes doctrine emphasizes that under federal legislation treating the Five Tribes differently from other tribes on reservations, the Choctaw and Chickasaw Tribes in southeastern Oklahoma would own all the water on their lands, and would not be subject to state authority as to its use or non-use.

The Winters ruling also applied to this case, because a ruling in 2007 determined that water rights were reserved even in riparian jurisdictions.

The ruling in this motion determined that the state did not have proper standing to proceed with this case without the Cherokee Nation's involvement.

== Water project law ==
Water project law is the branch of state and federal law that deals with the construction, management, financing, and repair of major water projects, including public drainage, irrigation, flood control, navigation and other projects. Some of these projects are constructed and managed by state and local government. But many are constructed and managed by special local improvement districts, which are special political subdivisions of state government.

Water project law has had, and continues to have, a significant role in the management of important water resources. For example, agricultural drainage, much of which is now responsible for maintaining a significant infrastructure, results largely from these local districts or other entities. Drainage in the United States occurred in two primary developmental periods, during 1870-1920 and during 1945-1960. By 1920, more than 53 million acres (210,000 km^{2}) out of a total of 956 million acres (3,870,000 km^{2}) of US farmland had received some form of drainage. The United States Department of Agriculture (USDA), 1982 Natural Resources Inventory (NRI) inventory identified about 107 million acres (430,000 km^{2}) of wet soils as being prime or adequately drained, of which 72 percent was then cropland. (Economic Research Service, 1987.) Often, state projects are constructed under the mantle of local water project authorities, using special federal funds appropriated for these purposes. Often the local entity must agree in return for the original federal funds to maintain the project indefinitely with local funds, derived either from taxes or special assessments.

Although there are unique state law features to water project instrumentalities, there are many features in common. Many of these districts are special improvement districts endowed by state law with the ability to collect revenues from lands that are benefited by the improvement. Often these assessments are in the form of special assessments which are proportional to the increase in value afforded the benefited land by the project. Or, the local improvement district may be afforded the power to levy special taxes, or to levy charges in return for the privilege of receiving the use and benefit of the project.

Some districts are governed by a board of elected officials. Voting rights may be based upon population within the district or in some cases based on the ownership of benefited lands. In some states, some districts are governed by existing local government entities, such as county government, but under special statutory authority. Statutes governing these districts govern the authority to levy assessments, charges, or taxes. They determine the obligation of the authority to maintain. In some cases, establishment of the project, or the district, affords benefited landowners statutory rights to insist on continued maintenance of the project if statutory criteria are met. For example, a certain number of landowners might be required to petition, and make a showing that the conditions for maintenance have been met. The statutes typically provide a method of seeking judicial review of the decisions made by the district in question.

== Major legal cases in American water law ==
- Arizona v. California (Colorado River)
- Colorado River Water Conservation District v. United States
- Sun Belt Water v. Canada NAFTA Arbitration
- Tri-state water dispute (Georgia, Alabama, Florida)
- Winters v. United States
- Wyoming v. Colorado (Laramie River)

== See also ==
- Colorado water courts
- Drinking water quality legislation of the United States
- History of California water law
- United States groundwater law
- Water wars in Florida
