= Sustainable Water and Innovative Irrigation Management =

Sustainable Water and Innovative Irrigation Management (SWIIM) is a farm-optimization and water-conservation system owned by SWIIM System, Ltd. that was developed by Regenesis Management Group, LLC., a Denver, Colorado-based incubator that focuses on natural resource conservation and optimization technology.

== SWIIM ==
SWIIM® is a toolset for crop planning, optimization, water management, monitoring and reporting. A part of the offering includes software: SWIIM Planner and SWIIM Manager. These components work together, communicating with SWIIM® Server, as a complete software package or as separate modules in order to meet the various objectives of growers and water managers. SWIIM is used for planning, optimizing and managing agricultural water rights held by irrigation districts, ditch companies, Native American communities or local agricultural cooperatives. It enables agricultural water rights owners to capture the economic benefits of managing water application with peak efficiency. SWIIM software models best practices to optimize water use and tracks savings within all elements of the crop water budget on an aggregated (system-wide) basis. It was designed to give water right owners the opportunity to lease a portion of their consumptive-use water rights to municipalities, private industry, and conservation groups without compromising the underlying water rights. SWIIM

The intention behind the technology is to provide an alternative to the dominant method for moving agricultural water to other uses known as "buy and dry," whereby an entity purchases agricultural land and "dries" the land in perpetuity, severing the water right from the property. Though many farmers participated in the practice in the 1990s, using water rights as their "401k retirement plans," it is seen as an unsustainable business practice as farms are taken out of operation. .

== History ==
Regenesis Management Group began research and development on the technology in 2009 through agreements with the U.S. Department of Agriculture–Agricultural Research Service (USDA-ARS) and Colorado State University (CSU). In 2013, the company added Utah State University to its partnerships. It secured a research and development site in northern Colorado in 2009. In 2010, the company began receiving grant support from the State of Colorado's Water Conservation Board to help support the system's implementation, and in 2012, it received a grant from the USDA to continue development.

=== Legal issues ===
In order to transfer surface (i.e., river) water rights in most of the western United States, historic subsurface return flows must be maintained and verified. This is known as Prior-appropriation water rights or the Colorado doctrine, and is different from Riparian water rights found in the eastern United States. Only the amount of water consumed by crops plus that which evaporates from the soil (known as the Consumptive water use value) can be transferred outside of agricultural production. State water codes and legal case precedents govern water ownership and transfers. Environmental interests can oppose transfers that impact farmland or ecosystems.
