= History of California water law =

The origin of water law in California dates back to the 1848 Gold Rush and the historical event's direct effect on water law development in the region. Despite California attaining statehood in 1850, water law in the region had already been rapidly developing since January 1848 (i.e. The start of the Gold Rush) due to the resource's centrality in gold processing and mining. The foundations of the 1850s Gold Rush's water laws, initially developing in the mining camps, are still present in California's modern water code, notably in the principles within prior appropriation.

== California water law ==
Water law in California aims to define the full scope of a water right (i.e. how much, quality of water, purposes behind the usage of water, etc.) and outline any principles on how to handle possible disputes between water rights-holders (i.e. damage assessment, determination of actionable harm, possible remedies, etc.). It has been the precedent in the United States and California to categorize the defining of the water right and its dispute guidelines under the scope of property and contract law, and tort law respectively.

While these categorizations mainly stay consistent across states, local water law tends to adopt certain differing systems according to the region. Areas in the Pacific West may opt for an appropriative rights system, while eastern areas may opt for a riparian water rights system; the regional lines of water rights' system are not strict, with many states adopting hybrid systems. Either way, each system developed first to handle any infringement on the right's holder water usage and then went on to implement conditions of the water right holder's free exercise.

== Law of the mining camps ==
Majority of the gold fields sat on United States public land ceded by the Treaty of Guadalupe (February 1848) and were scattered geographically, so no local governing body contained the resources to assert federal claim to the excavated resources. Thus the legal system was developed out of continuous mining disputes and their ramifications, with principles set before statehood later carrying into the official California state water code.

Mining camps were quickly springing up around California by 1849 and began to form their own communities and codes. Through these codes, miners settled claim and water disputes, and continued to do so into statehood with the sanction of the California state legislature. As gold field were scattered across the emerging state, the specifics of water law diversified according to locality; But while different areas had different rules, consistencies emerged from their simultaneous evolution.

=== Early days: 1848–1849 ===
Water law and claim rights to usage differed greatly in the first and second half of 1848. Up until July 1848, miners' accounts record no need to discuss claim rights in California rivers and stream, and it is the first mentions of a miner customs in Summer 1848 that propels the creation of a formal miner code across communities.

==== Mining codes ====
Initially, these rudimentary social codes in 1849 suggested that to claim segments of rivers a miner must leaving behind tools, and disputes of water containing gold were not taken to any official court, just a third party non affiliated miner. There was no formal property rights system in the 1848, as no scarcity in mining claims along the rivers and streams, or other terrains, existed. In 1849, as tens of thousands of non Native people immigrated to California, more complex codes began to emerge (i.e. water claims began to be bought and sold correspondingly to possible value, etc.).

==== Judicial systems ====
The mining camp judicial systems that eventually developed enough to handle water disputes were first established to enforce lynch law. Though not fully sophisticated, the system aimed to provide due process in the investigation of crimes through appointing of judges, jurors, and suitable punishment to crimes.

== Factors behind the development of water law ==
Historically, scholars have largely attributed the complex and rapid development of water law in California to have been spurred on by the aridity of the local climate. While the comparative lack of water was a central factor, since the 1980s academics have begun to highlight economic, social, and cultural forces that shaped Californian water law in the 1850s as well. Water law's concept of prior appropriation was developed and refined over the course of the 15 year Gold Rush due to these factors.

=== Economic factors ===
Decreasing capacity along California's waterways led to an increase in disputes. The influx of disputes and the rapid need to address them gave way to economic ramifications (i.e. an increase in transaction costs for miners, etc.).

=== Social factors ===
The majority of judges appointed to preside over water right disputes in this early era were subject to external pressures. Even as the system grew to be more formal, judicial elections still brought political influence into influential water law cases.

=== Cultural factors ===
While water law in the eastern United States traditionally organized its code around group ownership, water usage in the Gold Rush derived the resource from its natural origins and depleted the possible use for other holds, so Californian water code was organized around individuals in an appropriative rights system.

== See also ==
- Water in California
- California water wars
- Jesse W. Carter
- California Water Plan
- Colorado River Compact
- Los Padres Condor Range and River Protection Act of 1992
- Sustainable Groundwater Management Act
