= SGMA =

SGMA may refer to:

- The Southern Gospel Music Association
- The Sustainable Groundwater Management Act, a California law
