= Correlative rights doctrine =

The correlative rights doctrine is a legal doctrine limiting the rights of landowners to a common source of groundwater (such as an aquifer) to a reasonable share, typically based on the amount of land owned by each on the surface above. This doctrine is also applied to oil and gas in some U.S. states.

== See also ==
- Mineral rights
- Water rights
- United States groundwater law
