= Prior-appropriation water rights =

Legal doctrine for rights to water use

In the American legal system, prior appropriation water rights is the doctrine that the first person to take a quantity of water from a water source for "beneficial use" (agricultural, industrial or household) has the right to continue to use that quantity of water for that purpose. Subsequent users can take the remaining water for their own use if they do not impinge on the rights of previous users. The doctrine is sometimes summarized, "first in time, first in right".

Prior appropriation rights do not constitute a full ownership right in the water, merely the right to withdraw it, and can be abrogated if not used for an extended period of time.

== Origin ==
Water is very scarce in the Western United States and so must be allocated sparingly, based on the productivity of its use. The prior appropriation doctrine developed from Spanish (and later Mexican) civil law and differs from the riparian water rights that apply in the rest of the United States. The appropriation doctrine originated in Gold-Rush–era California, when miners sought to acquire water for mining operations. In the 1855 case of Irwin v. Phillips, Matthew Irwin diverted a stream for his mining operation. Shortly afterward, Robert Phillips started a mining operation downstream and eventually tried to divert the water back to its original streambed. The case was taken to the California Supreme Court, which ruled for Irwin.

== Nature of the right ==
The legal details of prior appropriation vary from state to state. Under the prior appropriation system, the right is initially allotted to those who are "first in time of use"; these rights of withdrawal can then trade on the open market, like other property. For water sources with many users, a government or quasi-government agency is usually charged with overseeing allocations. Allocations involving water sources that cross state borders or international borders can be quite contentious, and are generally governed by federal court rulings, interstate agreements and international treaties.

A claim of prior appropriation must prove four sub-claims: diversion (that the water had been withdrawn), priority (that the withdrawer had diverted water prior to the other claimant), intent (that the water had been withdrawn by design), and beneficial use (that the water was put to a publicly-acceptable end). If proved, the initial person to use a quantity of water from a water source for a beneficial use has the right to continue to use the same quantity of water for the same purpose. Subsequent users can use the remaining water for their own beneficial purposes provided that they do not impinge on the rights of previous users; this is the priority element of the doctrine. But neither can a senior user change the manner (i.e., location) in which they appropriate water to the detriment of a junior user. These Preservation of Conditions were granted to the second user after Farmers Highline Canal & Reservoir Co. v. City of Golden, 272 P.2d 629 (Colo. 1954). A senior water user could, for example, only have been using the water during a particular season. Then the purchaser of the water right could only use the water in the same season as when the right was established. In addition, the state may put additional conditions on the use of the water right to prevent polluting or inefficient uses of water.

Beneficial use is commonly defined as agricultural, industrial or household use. The doctrine has historically excluded ecological purposes, such as maintaining a natural body of water and the wildlife that depends on it, but some jurisdictions now accept such claims. The extent to which private parties may own such rights varies among the states.

Each water right has a yearly quantity and an appropriation date. Each year, the user with the earliest appropriation date (known as the "senior appropriator") may use up to their full allocation (provided the water source can supply it). Then the user with the next earliest appropriation date may use their full allocation and so on. In cases of water shortages, prior-appropriation does not require a senior user to utilize less water than usual. Therefore, during times of drought, users with junior appropriation dates might not receive their full allocation or even any water at all.

When a water right is sold, it retains its original appropriation date. Only the amount of water historically consumed can be transferred if a water right is sold. For example, if alfalfa is grown using flood irrigation, the amount of the return flow may not be transferred, only the amount that would be necessary to irrigate the amount of alfalfa historically grown.

Prior appropriation rights are subject to certain adverse possession-type rules to reduce speculation. Withdrawal rights can be lost or shrunk over time if unused for a certain number of years, or if a litigant can demonstrate that the water's use is not beneficial. Abandonment of a water right is rare, but occurred in Colorado in a case involving the South Fork of San Isabel Creek in Saguache County.

=== Interaction with other allocation methods ===
In some states, junior upstream water users may take water from downstream users, as long as they return the water in comparable quantity and quality.

California and Texas grant waterfront property owners water allocations prior to any other users, in a hybrid system with riparian water rights. In Oregon, landowners have rights to water on their own land at a certain time at which it is then incorporated into the appropriation system.

== Adoption ==
Rules regarding ownership of underground water by country, with prior-appriopiation rule in purple

Alaska, Arizona, California, Colorado, Hawaii, Idaho, Kansas, Montana, Nebraska, Nevada, New Mexico, North Dakota, Oklahoma, Oregon, South Dakota, Texas, Utah, Washington, and Wyoming all use the prior appropriation doctrine, with permitting and reporting as their regulatory system. Of these, California, Texas, and Oregon recognize a dual doctrine system that employs both riparian and prior appropriation rights (see § Interaction with other allocation methods). Eight states (Arizona, Colorado, Idaho, Montana, Nevada, New Mexico, Utah, and Wyoming) engage in prior appropriation without recognizing the riparian doctrine.

However, prior appropriation does not always determine water allocation in these states because various federal regulations also have priority over senior users. For example, the Endangered Species Act of 1973 seeks to protect animals at risk of extinction, so a senior user's rights may be restricted in favor of federal regulation protecting the habitats of endangered animals. These federal rules manifest as a prior allotment by the Secretary of the Interior.

=== Arizona ===
Arizona adopted the prior appropriation doctrine such that a person could acquire this water right simply by applying it to beneficial use and posting an appropriation notice at the point of diversion. On June 12, 1919, they enacted the Public Water Code in which the person must apply for and obtain a permit for water use.

=== Colorado ===
The appropriation doctrine was adopted in Colorado in 1872 when the territorial court ruled in Yunker v. Nichols, 1 Colo. 552 (1872), that a non-riparian user who had previously applied part of the water from a stream to beneficial use had superior rights to the water with respect to a riparian owner who claimed a right to use of all the water at a later time. The question was not squarely presented again to the Colorado Court until 1882 when in the landmark case, Coffin v. Left Hand Ditch Co., 6 Colo. 443 (1882), the court explicitly adopted the appropriation doctrine and rejected the riparian doctrine, citing Colorado irrigation and mining practices and the nature of the climate. The decision in Coffin ruled that prior to adoption of the appropriation doctrine in the Colorado Constitution of 1876 that the riparian doctrine had never been the law in Colorado. Within 20 years the appropriation doctrine, the so-called Colorado Doctrine, had been adopted, in whole or part, by most of the states in the Western United States that had an arid climate.

=== New Mexico ===
New Mexico enacted its appropriate Surface-Water Code in 1907. Later, in 1931, New Mexico enacted the Underground Water Law that adapted the state's surface law to ground water.

=== Montana ===
The prior-appropriation doctrine was adopted in 1973 in Montana under the 1973 Water Use Act. Later, they then passed the Montana Ground Water Assessment Act in 1991.

=== Texas ===
In 1967, Texas passed the Water Rights Adjudication Act in regards to surface waters such that the allocation of these waters was under a unified permit system.

== Criticism ==
Each drop of rain falling through the sky has already been allocated to a user. Leave the hose running between rinses while you wash your car and you won't run afoul of the law; but if you gather a pailful of rainwater and pour on your tomato plant, look over your shoulder for a water cop. You will be preventing those raindrops from entering the watershed, depriving people downstream from the surrounding creeks and rivers of their rights to use their apportioned amounts of streamflow. The doctrine of prior appropriation comes crashing up against the imperative to conserve scarce water. Colorado made it legal for some homeowners to harvest rain and snow from their roofs. Tucson is encouraging its citizens to gather rainwater. Santa Fe made catchment devices mandatory for new dwellings. But, in Utah and Washington (with the exception of Seattle), harvesting raindrops is still a crime.

— Stephen Grace

Even though water markets increasingly gain ground, many criticize the prior appropriation system for failing to adequately adjust to society's evolving values and needs. Environmentalists and recreational river-users demand more water be left in rivers and streams, but courts have been slow to accept these requests as beneficial uses. Conversely, the tool of beneficial use is too tied to custom to encourage users to conserve. An appropriator who uses water inefficiently retains the right to the full allotment, but an appropriator who uses only a portion risks losing the right to the rest, and water right markets remain too illiquid to purchase any excess. As a result, the vast majority of water in the West still is allocated to agricultural uses despite cries for additional water from growing cities.

High demand can cause an over-appropriation of the waters, in which there are more water rights for a particular stream than water actually available. This leads to an apparent inefficiency: if a water source is over-appropriated, the latest users will almost never see water from their claims. But without those claims, excess water from an unusually wet year will go to waste.

== In other goods ==
Water is not the only public good that has been subject to prior appropriation. The same first in time, first in right theory has been used in the United States to encourage and give a legal framework for other commercial activities.

The early prospectors and miners in the California Gold Rush of 1849, and later gold and silver rushes in the western United States, applied appropriation theory to mineral deposits. The first one to discover and begin mining a deposit was acknowledged to have a legal right to mine. Because appropriation theory in mineral lands and water rights developed in the same time and place, it is likely that they influenced one another. As with water rights, mining rights could be forfeited by nonuse. The miners codes were later legalized by the federal government in 1866, and then in the Mining Law of 1872.

The Homestead Act of 1862 granted legal title to the first farmer to put public land into agricultural production. This first in time right to agricultural land may have been influenced by appropriation theory applied to mineral lands.

In recent years, there has been some discussion of limiting air pollution by granting rights to existing pollution sources. Then it has been argued, a free cap and trade market could develop in pollution rights. This would be prior appropriation theory applied to air pollution. Recent concern over carbon dioxide and global warming has led to an economic market in CO_{2} emissions, in which some companies wish to balance emissions increases by offsetting decreases in existing emissions sources. This is essentially acknowledging a prior appropriation right to existing CO_{2} emitters.

== See also ==
- Air rights
- Countryside and Rights of Way Act 2000 (in the UK)
- Crown land (see "Logging and mineral rights" under Canada)
- Easement ("the right of use over the real property of another")
- Land rights
- Right of public access to the wilderness
- Riparian water rights
- United States groundwater law
- Civil law (legal system)
