= Consumptive water use =

Removing water from a supply without returning it

Consumptive water use is water removed from available supplies without return to a water resource system (e.g., water used in manufacturing, agriculture, and food preparation that is not returned to a stream, river, or water treatment plant). Evaporation from the surface of the Earth into clouds of water in the air which then falls to the ground as "rain" is excluded from this model. Crop consumptive water use is the amount of water transpired during plant growth plus what evaporates from the soil surface and foliage in the crop area. The portion of water consumed in crop production depends on many factors, especially the irrigation technology.
