= Groundwater law in the United States =

US Groundwater Law

United States groundwater law is that area of United States law related to groundwater. Groundwater protection provisions are included in the Safe Drinking Water Act, Resource Conservation and Recovery Act, and the Superfund act.

Groundwater can either be privately owned or publicly owned. Groundwater owned by the State is usually distributed through an appropriation system. Privately owned groundwater may allow unlimited production or limited production rights based on land ownership or liability rules. It is possible to regulate the spacing of wells and groundwater production under any of these systems, but the methods, effectiveness and results of that regulation varies greatly from one system to the next depending on the type of aquifer to be regulated. Effective regulation is tailored to both the hydrology and economics of the region to be regulated. Below is a short discussion of each system and the advantages and disadvantages of each.

== Rule of capture ==
The Rule of capture is a non-liability tort law that provides each landowner the ability to capture as much groundwater as they can put to a beneficial use, but they are not guaranteed any set amount of water. As a result, well-owners are not liable to other landowners for damaging their wells or taking water from beneath their land. The Rule of Capture allows the capture of groundwater only to the extent the use is beneficial and not malicious. The advantage of this system is that it encourages economic development and maximum utilization of the available resources. Another advantage of this system is that it leads to minimal government involvement in the operations of water wells. The primary disadvantage of this system is the potential for overproduction of the aquifer system that may result when each landowner attempts to protect the water right by drilling bigger, deeper wells. Because no landowner is given a quantifiable or set amount of production capacity, all landowners are encouraged to capture as much water as they can as quickly as they can.

== Riparian rights ==
Correlative groundwater rights represent a limited private ownership right similar to riparian rights in a surface stream. The amount of groundwater right is based on the size of the surface area where each landowner gets a corresponding amount of the available water. Once adjudicated, the maximum amount of the water right is set, but the right can be decreased if the total amount of available water decreases as is likely during a drought. Landowners may sue others for encroaching upon their groundwater rights, and water pumped for use on the overlying land takes preference over water pumped for use off the land. This system benefits those who have low demand for water but own large expanses of property - such as ranchers - and harms those who have a high demand for water without correspondingly large tracts of land - such as cities and some irrigators. Only California follows the correlative right system for groundwater, although many states follow a similar system for oil and gas production. Water is a rechargeable resource and so the amount of the water right may be reduced, marketing the groundwater right can be difficult. The preference for water uses on the land makes it difficult to market the water or water rights.

== Reasonable use rule ==
The third system involving private ownership rights is the liability rule known as the American Rule or Reasonable Use Rule. This rule does not guarantee the landowner a set amount of water, but allows unlimited extraction as long as the result does not unreasonably damage other wells or the aquifer system. Usually this rule gives great weight to historical uses and prevents new uses that interfere with the prior use. The determination of who gets a well and how much water may be pumped is usually made by a court unless the state creates a regulatory agency to perform that function, and the primary issue is the "reasonableness" of the use. The advantage to this system is its flexibility in adjudicating competing uses of an aquifer system. Unfortunately, this same flexibility can lead to excessive litigation because well owners may sue at any time to determine if a competing use is "reasonable", a standard that may change with time. The reasonableness standard is also highly dependent on the location of the suit and who ends up in the jury pool. Marketing water rights does not take place until the system is fully adjudicated; new users generally do not purchase groundwater rights until they are sure they cannot obtain "free" water through litigation.

Many states, especially in the western United States, claim ownership of groundwater and allocate the resource through an appropriative system just as they would any surface right. Typically water rights are appropriated based on each aquifer's sustainable yield, and once all the rights are granted no further permits will be issued. Some states allow the permits to be marketed and some do not. Where the water is not owned by the state and the tort law proves to be an inadequate means to prevent overproduction, states have created administrative regulatory agencies to allocate groundwater rights between competing landowners. In those cases the administrative law essentially supplants the tort law, making the tort remedy (or lack thereof) irrelevant.

== See also ==
- Bulkhead
- Drainage law
- Riparian rights
- Water politics
