= Beneficial use =

Legal term for a person's right to enjoy the benefits of specific property

"Beneficial use" is a legal term describing a person's right to enjoy the benefits of specific property, especially a view or access to light, air, or water, even though title to that property is held by another person. It is also referred to as "beneficial enjoyment".

By contrast, "beneficial interest" is where a beneficiary has an interest in a thing ("res"), such as a trust or estate, but does not own the underlying property, usually entitling the beneficiary to some of the income from the underlying property.

Similarly, a beneficial owner is where specific property rights ("use and title") in equity belong to a person even though legal title of the property belongs to another person. For example, companies often hold company shares or bank funds in their names for the benefit of specific people.
