= Riparian water rights =

Property rights adjacent to waterways

Riparian water rights (or simply riparian rights) is a system for allocating water among those who possess land along its path. It has its origins in English common law. Riparian water rights exist in many jurisdictions with a common law heritage, such as Canada, Australia, New Zealand, and states in the eastern United States.

Common land ownership can be organized into a partition unit, a corporation consisting of the landowners on the shore that formally owns the water area and determines its use.

== General principle ==
Under the riparian principle, all landowners whose properties adjoin a body of water have the right to make reasonable use of it as it flows through or over their properties. If there is not enough water to satisfy all users, allotments are generally fixed in proportion to frontage on the water source. These rights cannot be sold or transferred other than with the adjoining land and only in reasonable quantities associated with that land. The water cannot be transferred out of the watershed without due consideration as to the rights of the downstream riparian landowners.

Riparian rights include such things as the right to access for swimming, boating and fishing; the right to wharf out to a point of navigability; the right to erect structures such as docks, piers, and boat lifts; the right to use the water for domestic purposes; the right to accretions caused by water level fluctuations; the right to exclusive use if the waterbody is non-navigable. Riparian rights also depend upon "reasonable use" as it relates to other riparian owners to ensure that the rights of one riparian owner are weighed fairly and equitably with the rights of adjacent riparian owners.

== England and Wales ==
The Environment Agency lists the riparian rights and duties in England and Wales.

The rights include ownership of the land up to the centre of the watercourse unless it is known to be owned by someone else, the right for water to flow onto land in its natural quantity and quality, the right to protect property from flooding and land from erosion subject to approval by the agency, the right to fish in the watercourse unless the right is sold or leased if an angler has a valid Environment Agency rod licence. They also include the right to acquire accretion and the right to boomage (a fee charge for securing a boom, generally for the retention of logs).

Duties arising from the model include the following:

- Pass on the flow of water without obstruction, pollution or diversion affecting the rights of others.
- Maintain the bed and banks of the watercourse and to clear any debris, whether natural or artificial, to keep any culverts, rubbish screens, weirs and mill gates clear of debris.
- Be responsible for protection of land from flooding and cause no obstructions, temporary or permanent, preventing the free passage of fish.
- Accept flood flows even if caused by inadequate capacity downstream, but there is no duty to improve the drainage capacity of a watercourse.

== United States ==
The United States recognizes two types of water rights. Although use and overlap varies over time and by state, the western arid states that were once under Mexico and Spain generally follow the doctrine of prior appropriation, also known as "first-come, first-served", but water rights for the eastern states follow riparian law.

=== Riparian rights ===
Under riparian law, water is a public good like the air, sunlight, or wildlife. It is not "owned" by the government, state or private individual but is rather included as part of the land over which it falls from the sky or then travels along the surface.

In determining the contours of riparian rights, there is a clear distinction between navigable (public) waters and non-navigable waters. The land below navigable waters is the property of state, and subject to all the public land laws and in most states public trust rights. Navigable waters are treated as public highways with any exclusive riparian right ending at the ordinary high water mark. Like a road, any riparian right is subordinate to the public's right to travel on the river, but any public right is subject to nuisance laws and the police power of the state. It is not an individual right or liberty interest. Because a finding of navigability establishes state versus federal property, navigability for purposes of riverbed title is a federal question determined under federal law. The states retain the power of defining the scope of the public trust over navigable waters. A non-navigable stream is synonymous with private property, or jointly owned property if it serves as a boundary.

The state could choose to divest itself of title to the streambed, but the waters and use of the waters remains subject to the Commerce Clause of the United States Constitution which holds an easement or servitude, benefiting the federal government for the purpose of regulating commerce on navigable bodies of water.

The reasonable use of the water by a riparian owner is subject to the downstream riparian owner's "riparian right" to receive waters undiminished in flow and quality. Federal environmental regulation of non-navigable waters under the Clean Water Act of 1972 was possible, because all surface waters eventually flowed to the public ocean. This has been the subject of political controversy, for example over implementation of the Clean Water Rule.

In 2023 the United States Supreme Court ruled in Sackett v. EPA by a 5–4 decision that the EPA could only regulate waters in the United States which have not been isolated from larger bodies of water.

=== States' involvement ===
Federal courts have long recognized that state laws establish the extent of the riparian and public right. In the case of navigable waters, title goes to the average low water mark. The Pennsylvania Supreme Court defined it as the "ordinary low water mark, unaffected by drought; that is, the height of the water at ordinary stages." Land below the low water mark on navigable rivers belongs to the state government in the case of the 13 original states.

Lands between the high and low water marks on navigable rivers are subject to the police powers of the states. In the case of the original 13 states, upon ratification of the US Constitution, title to these submerged lands remained vested in the several states similar to the public or common roads.

As new lands were acquired by the United States, either by purchase or treaty, title to the highways and the beds of all navigable, or tidal, water bodies became vested in the United States unless they had been validly conveyed into private ownership by the former sovereign. During the territorial period, the United States held these title "in trust" for the benefit of the future states that would be carved out of the territory. Each of the states were to come into the Union on an "equal footing" with the original 13 states. Under the equal footing doctrine, territorial states are vested with the same sovereign title rights to navigable submerged lands as the original 13 states. However, during the territorial period, the United States could convey certain of these lands under the limited circumstances of promoting commerce.

Ownership of lands submerged by navigable waters was resolved by Congress passing the Submerged Lands Act, which confirmed state title to the beds of all tidal and navigable bodies of water. While the act conveyed land title to the states, non-navigable stream beds remained treated like dry lands and contiguous to the adjoining estates. Waters subject to the ebb and flow of the tides, even if non-navigable, also passed to the states, but the continued ownership and public use of these tidal/marsh lands are based on state laws.

== See also ==
- Air rights
- Common law
- Countryside and Rights of Way Act 2000 (in the UK)
- Crown land (see "logging and mineral rights" under Canada)
- Freedom to roam
- Land rights
- Littoral rights
- Riparian zone
- Drinking water
- Water rights
- Sustainable habitat
- United States groundwater law
- Right to light
