= History of California (1900–present) =

After 1900, California continued to grow rapidly and soon became an agricultural and industrial power. The economy was widely based on specialty agriculture, oil, tourism, shipping, film, and after 1940 advanced technology such as aerospace and electronics industries – along with a significant military presence. The films and stars of Hollywood helped make the state the "center" of worldwide attention. California became an American cultural phenomenon; the idea of the "California Dream" as a portion of the larger American Dream of finding a better life drew 35 million new residents from the start to the end of the 20th century (1900–2010). Silicon Valley became the world's center for computer innovation.

== California demographics ==
Historical population
Census	Pop.	Note	%±
1840	8,000		—
1850	120,000		1,400.0%
1860	379,994		216.7%
1870	560,247		47.4%
1880	864,694		54.3%
1890	1,213,398		40.3%
1900	1,485,053		22.4%
1910	2,377,549		60.1%
1920	3,426,861		44.1%
1930	5,677,251		65.7%
1940	6,907,387		21.7%
1950	10,586,223		53.3%
1960	15,717,204		48.5%
1970	19,953,134		27.0%
1980	23,667,902		18.6%
1990	29,760,021		25.7%
2000	33,871,648		13.8%
2010	37,253,956		10.0%
2020	39,538,223		6.1%
Sources: 1850–2020 U.S. Census * The 1850 statistics are corrected for lost census data in San Francisco, Santa Clara and Contra Costa Counties. California Indians were not counted before the 1870 census.

California is now the most populous state in the United States. If it were an independent country, California would rank 34th in population in the world. California has had waves of immigration and emigration over the years. The first big wave was the California Gold Rush starting in 1848 of miners, businessmen, farmers, loggers, etc. as well as their many supporters.

There were fewer than 10,000 females in a total California population (not including Native Americans who were not counted) of about 120,000 residents in 1850. About 3.0% of the gold rush Argonauts before 1850 were female or about 3,500 female Gold Rushers, compared to about 115,000 male California Gold Rushers. Massive immigration from mostly other states continued throughout the nineteenth century. California did not reach a "normal" male to female ratio of about one to one until the 1950 census. California for over a century was short on females.

The 1900 census showed emigrations down to "only" a 20% growth rate. The early 1900s showed a massive population increase of over 60% between 1900 and 1910. The population more than doubled again in the next 20 years by 1930. Foreign immigration largely ceased during the Great Depression, as immigration to the United States was held to a low of 23,068 per year by 1933, and many foreign workers were deported. There were not enough jobs to go around. After World War II and the Great Depression, there was a rapidly increasing buildup of United States workers in California as wartime industries boomed. Most of these workers were from other states as they settled in California and increased the California population to 10,586,223 by 1950. Immigration to the United States only started to increase significantly in 1946, when immigration to all of the United States was back up to 108,721 per year. The continuing prosperity and emigration from other states and immigration from other countries in the 1950s and 1970s almost doubled the California population again to 19,953,134 by 1970. The 1970–2010 population growth has still been substantial but has slowed to "only" about a 15% growth rate per decade. By 2010 the California population growth rate slowed slightly to 10%.

== California earthquakes ==
Earthquakes in California are common occurrences since the state is traversed by six major strike-slip fault systems with hundreds of related faults, many of which are "brother faults" of the infamous San Andreas Fault that runs nearly the full length of California at the juncture of the Pacific Plate and the North American Plate. The fault systems include the Hayward Fault Zone, Calaveras Fault, Clayton-Marsh Creek-Greenville Fault, and the San Gregorio Fault. Significant blind thrust faults (faults with near vertical motion and no surface ruptures) are associated with portions of the Santa Cruz Mountains and the northern reaches of the Diablo Range and Mount Diablo. The California earthquake forecast gives a rough estimate of where the main earthquake zones in California are. Earthquake damage depends on what area is hit, how close to the surface the center of the earthquake is located, and its magnitude. Earthquake damage, for a given magnitude earthquake, to human structures depends on how well the buildings are built and what the structures are located on. Buildings on soft or filled-in soil suffer the most because they feel shock waves most strongly. Buildings on bedrock suffer less damage because the ground is firmer. Sometimes the ensuing fires, floods or tsunamis caused by the earthquake are often where the greatest damage occurs.

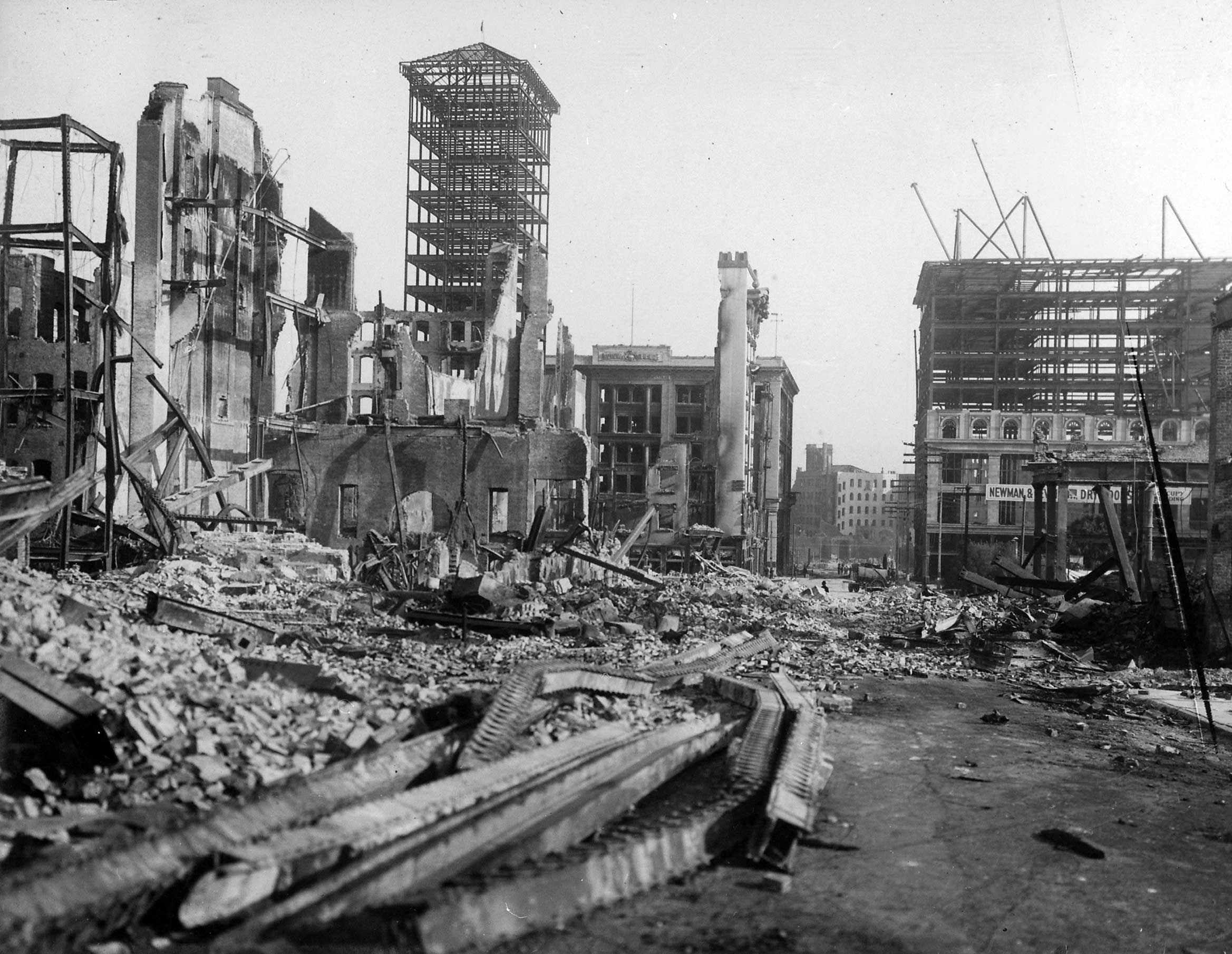
Stockton Street from Union Square, looking toward Market Street.

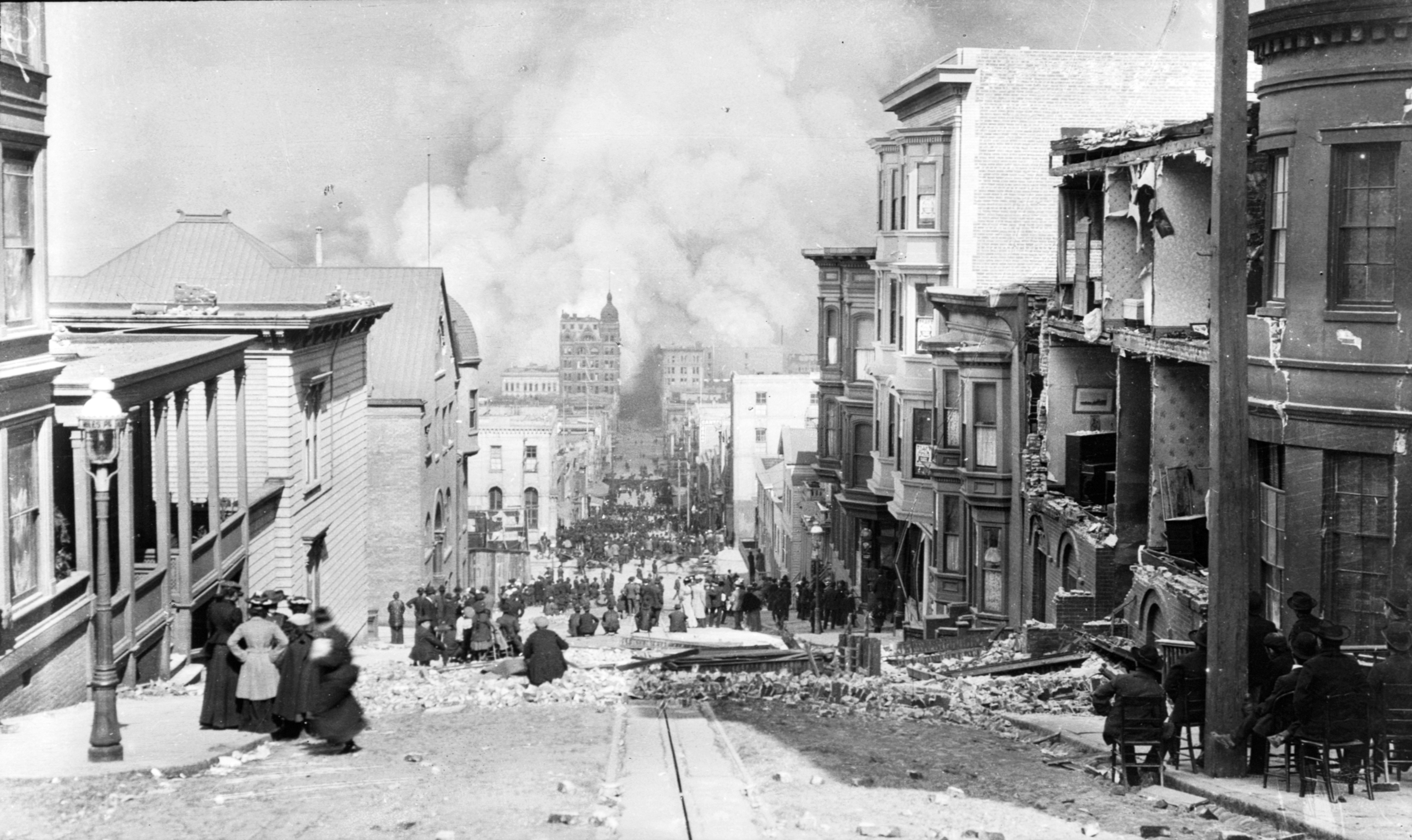
Arnold Genthe's famous photograph, looking toward the fire on Sacramento Street.

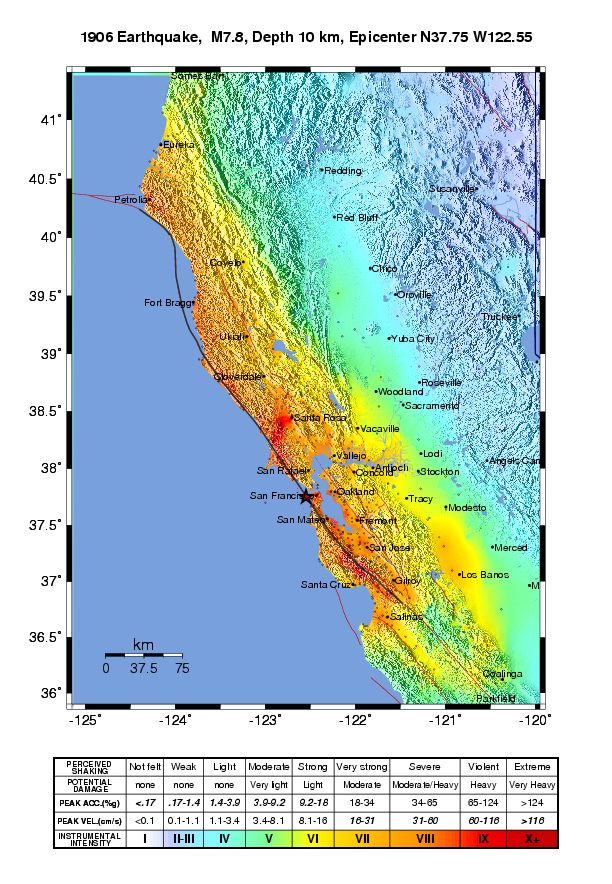
The intensity of the earthquake.

The 1906 San Francisco earthquake struck the city (then the largest in California) and nearby communities at 5:12 a.m. on Wednesday, April 18, 1906. Devastating fires broke out in the city that lasted for several days, destroying about 28,000 buildings. As a result of the quake and fires, over 3,000 people died and over 80% of San Francisco was destroyed. The death toll from the earthquake and resulting fire is the greatest loss of life from a natural disaster in California's history.

The most widely accepted estimate for the magnitude of the earthquake is a moment magnitude (M_{w}) or Richter magnitude (M_{L}) of 7.8; however, other values have been proposed, from 7.7 to as high as 8.25. Shaking was felt from Oregon to Los Angeles, and inland as far as central Nevada.

The San Francisco 1906 earthquake was caused by a rupture on the San Andreas Fault, a continental transform fault that forms part of the tectonic boundary between the Pacific Plate and the North American Plate. The fault is characterized by mainly lateral motion where the western (Pacific) plate moves northward relative to the eastern (North American) plate. The 1906 rupture propagated both northward and southward from its epicenter for a total of about 300 miles (480 km). The San Andreas Fault runs the length of California from the Salton Sea in the south to Cape Mendocino to the north, a distance of about 810 miles (1,300 km). The earthquake ruptured the northern third of the fault for a distance of about 300 miles (480 km). The maximum observed surface displacement was about 20 feet (6.1 m); however, geodetic measurements show displacements of up to 28 feet (8.5 m) in some places. The most recent analysis by the United States Geological Survey (USGS) shows that the most likely epicenter of the 1906 earthquake was very near Mussel Rock on the coast of Daly City, an adjacent suburb just south of San Francisco.

A strong foreshock preceded the mainshock by about 20 to 25 seconds. The strong shaking of the main shock lasted about 42 seconds. The shaking intensity as described on the Modified Mercalli intensity scale reached VIII in San Francisco and up to IX in areas to the north like Santa Rosa, where destruction was devastating. There were decades of minor earthquakes – more than at any other time in the historical record for northern California – before the 1906 quake. They have been widely interpreted subsequently as precursory activity to the 1906 earthquake.

Significant California earthquakes
Earthquake	Magnitude	Fatalities
1906 San Francisco	7.8	3,000+^{1}
1925 Santa Barbara	6.3–6.8	13
1933 Long Beach	6.4	115
1952 Kern County	7.3	12
1971 San Fernando	6.6	65
1989 Loma Prieta	6.9	63
1994 Northridge	6.7	60
Notes: 1. The 1906 San Francisco earthquake caused; so much damage that the authorities "lied" about the number of casualties. Subsequent research has shown that about 3,450 were "known" to have died. Some more were shot for looting.

Due to a widespread practice by insurers to indemnify San Francisco properties from fire, but not earthquake damage, most of the destruction in the city was blamed on the fires. Some property owners deliberately set fire to damaged properties in order to claim them on their insurance. Capt. Leonard D. Wildman of the U.S. Army Signal Corps reported that he "was stopped by a fireman who told me that people in that neighborhood were firing their houses… they were told that they would not get their insurance on buildings damaged by the earthquake unless they were damaged by fire. The insurance industry eventually paid out over $250,000,000 (the largest amount they paid out for the next 60 years) which significantly helped to rebuild the city." Building standards of the original 1906 buildings had almost no earthquake resistance built in. Since 1906 earthquake standards have been steadily upgraded as damages caused by earthquakes are investigated. Unfortunately, a lot of older buildings do not meet today's standards, and it would typically cost too much to upgrade them. It was discovered in 1906 (again) that all masonry-type structures built of brick and un-reinforced concrete are resistant to fire but not earthquakes. A detailed analysis of the city of San Francisco today estimates that an earthquake over 7.0 magnitude would completely destroy or seriously damage many sections of San Francisco and could possibly result in thousands of deaths. Today in most communities, structures built to later earthquake standards would do well in all but the strongest earthquakes. The water mains and other infrastructure needed for fighting fires have all been upgraded but are yet untested.

== California oil industry ==
California pioneers after 1848 discovered an increasing number of oil seeps—oil seeping to the surface, especially in Humboldt, Colusa, Santa Clara, and San Mateo counties, and in the asphaltum seeps and bituminous residues in Mendocino, Marin, Contra Costa, Santa Clara, and Santa Cruz counties. In southern California, large seeps in Ventura, Santa Barbara, Kern, and Los Angeles counties received the most attention. Interest in oil and gas seeps was stirred in the 1850s and 1860s, becoming widespread after the 1859 commercial uses of oil were demonstrated in Pennsylvania. Kerosene quickly replaced whale oil for lighting, and lubricating oils became an essential product in the Machine Age. Other uses later in the 19th century included providing paving material for many roads and providing power for many steam locomotives and steam-powered shipping—replacing coal.

Oil became a major California industry in the 20th century with the discovery of new fields around Los Angeles and the San Joaquin Valley, and the dramatic explosion in demand for gasoline to fuel the rapidly growing number of automobiles and trucks now being produced. Most of the oil production in California began in the late 19th century. At the turn of the century, oil production in California continued to rise at a booming rate. In 1900, the state of California produced 4 million barrels. In 1903, California became the leading oil-producing state in the US, and traded the number one position back and forth with Oklahoma through 1930. Production at the various oil fields increased to about 34 million barrels per year by 1904. By 1910 production had reached 78 million barrels. California drilling operations and oil production are concentrated primarily in Kern County, the San Joaquin Valley, and the Los Angeles Basin.

As of 2012, California was the nation's third most prolific oil-producing state, behind only Texas and North Dakota. In the past century, California's oil industry grew to become the state's number one GDP export and one of the most profitable industries in California.

There is also some offshore oil and gas production in California, but there is now a moratorium on new offshore oil and gas leasing and drilling in California waters and a deferral of leasing in federal waters. These restrictions were imposed after a series of accidents in the 1969 Santa Barbara oil spill released oil into the Pacific Ocean.

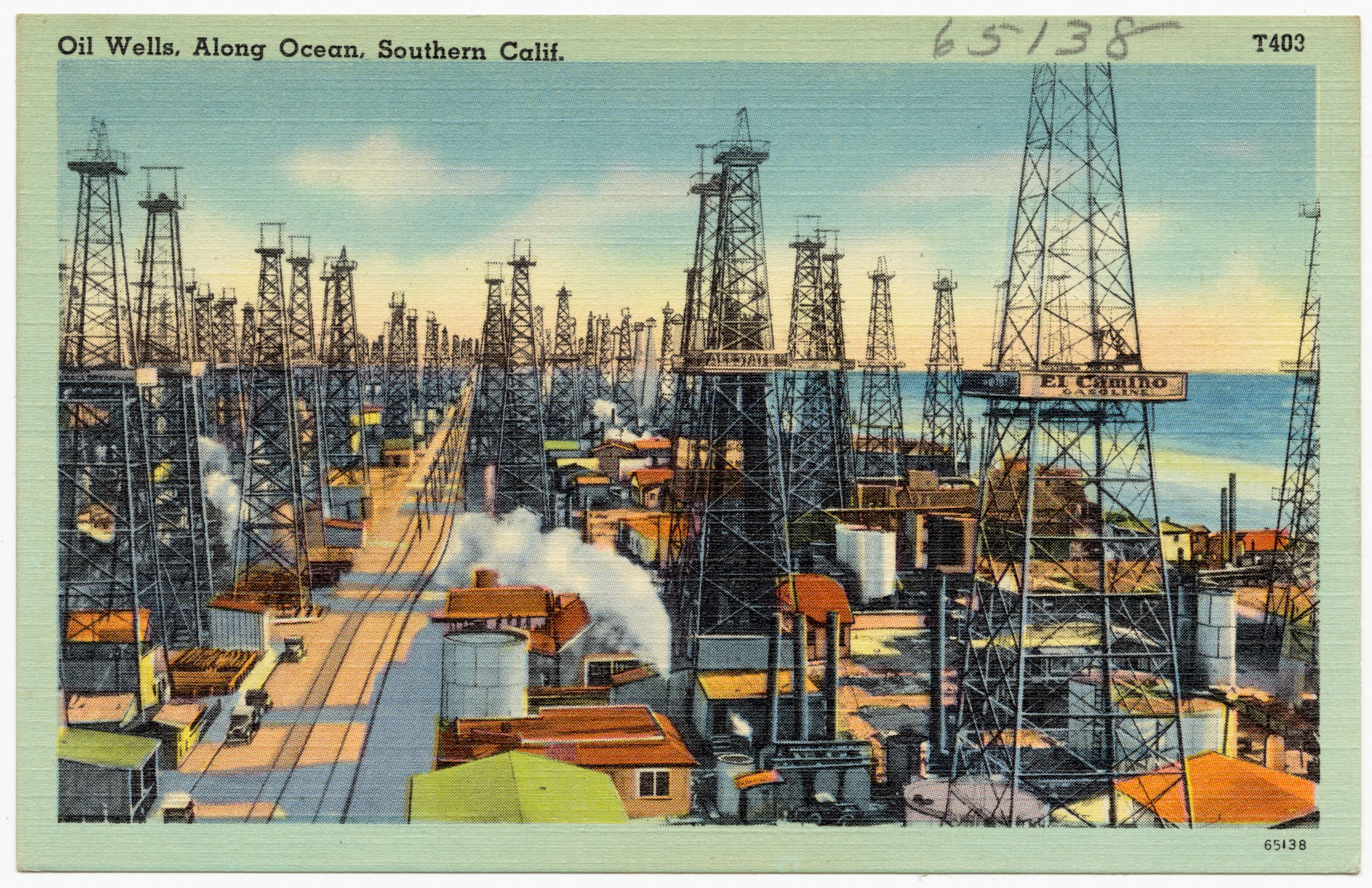
Postcard view of oil fields c.1940s.

In 1920, oil production in California had expanded to 77 million barrels. Between 1920 and 1930, new oil fields across southern California were being discovered with regularity, including Huntington Beach in 1920, Long Beach and Santa Fe Springs in 1921, and Dominguez in 1923. Southern California had become the hotbed for oil production in the United States.

However, the development of increased oil production in California had consequences. The additional California oil fields, along with booming oil supplies in Texas and Oklahoma, put downward pressure on the price. In the 1930s the Texas Railroad Commission tried to take charge of allocating oil production among the states to keep prices from falling to a few pennies a barrel.

After a century, the San Joaquin Valley remains a major producer. The Kern County part of the valley in 2008 had over 42,000 producing oil wells that provided about 68% of the oil produced in California, 10% of the entire United States production, and close to 1% of the total world oil production. Add to that another producing 2,000 wells in Fresno County. If the valley were a state in its own right, it would rank behind Texas, Alaska, and Louisiana as the fourth largest oil producer state in the country.

California oil production in 2005
State	Barrels/day
Louisiana	1,463,000
Texas	1,331000
Alaska	894,000
California San Joaquin Valley	515,000
Oklahoma	177,000
New Mexico	171,000

The San Joaquin Valley is also home to 21 giant oil fields that have produced over 100 million barrels of oil each, with four "super giants" that have produced over 1 billion barrels of oil. Among these "super giants" are Midway-Sunset, the largest oil field in the lower 49 United States, and Elk Hills, the former United States Naval Petroleum Reserve.

For a chronology of the state's oil industry see California oil and gas industry#Chronology of the California oil industry.

=== Natural gas ===
In 2020 the state was the 14th largest producer of natural gas in the United States, with a total annual production of over 170 billion cu feet of gas. In 2014 natural gas was the second most widely used energy source in California. About 45% was burned in gas-fired plants for electricity generation; the proportion increases as coal-burning plants are phased out and nearly all new plants are powered by natural gas. One of the main advantages of natural gas is that it only produces about 55% as much CO_{2} as coal for the same amount of electricity produced. About 9% of the natural gas was used in facilitating the extraction of more oil and gas. Another 21% was used for residential space and water heating, cooking, clothes drying, etc.; 9% was used for commercial building and water heating, and 15% was used in industrial use. California imports about 85% of its natural gas, using six large gas pipelines from Texas, New Mexico and Canada.

== California businessmen ==
In 1911 a new California Assembly created a new railroad commission with vastly enlarged powers and brought public utilities under state supervision. Organized businessmen were the leaders of both of these reforms. The driving force for railroad regulation came less from an outraged public seeking lower rates than from shippers and merchants who wanted to stabilize their businesses. Public utility officers spearheaded campaigns for the passage, and later the enlargement of the Public Utilities Act. They expected that state regulation would reduce wasteful competition between their companies, improve the value of their companies' securities, and allow them to escape continual wrangling with county and municipal authorities.

Although the businessmen were influential in obtaining the passage of bills they wanted, no group of businessmen dominated the California legislature or the railroad commission after 1910. Legislation proposed by some businessmen was opposed by other business interests. Organized labor made significant gains during the Progressive Era, but they were not a result of benevolent, middle-class reformer actions, but of powerful lobbying activity on the part of unions with their solid base in San Francisco and Oakland.

In the 1920s, most progressives came to view the business culture of the day not as a repudiation of progressive goals but as the fulfillment of it. The most important progressive victories of 1921 were the passage of administrative reorganization laws, the King Bill, increasing corporate taxes, and a progressive budget. In 1927–31, governor Clement Calhoun Young (1869–1947) brought more progressivism to the state. The state began large-scale hydroelectric power development, and began state aid to the handicapped. California became the first state to enact a modern old-age pension law. The state park system was upgraded, and California (like most states) rapidly expanded its highway program, funding it through a tax on gasoline, and creating the California Highway Patrol.

== California women ==
California women had the right to own property in their own name since the first California Constitution in 1850. In 1911 California voters, in a special election, narrowly granted women the right to vote, nine years before the 19th Amendment enfranchised women nationally in 1920, but over 41 years later than the women of Wyoming had been granted the right to vote. Women's clubs flourished and turned a spotlight on issues such as public schools, dirt and pollution, and public health. California women were leaders in the temperance movement, moral reform, conservation, public schools, recreation, and other issues. They helped pass the 18th amendment, which established Prohibition in 1920. Initially, women did not often run for public office.

== Progressive Era ==
California played a major role in the Progressive Movement. It was the only state where the Progressives took control of the Republican Party.

=== Lincoln–Roosevelt League ===
California was a leader in the Progressive Movement from the 1890s into the 1920s. A coalition of reform-minded Republicans, especially in southern California, coalesced around Thomas Bard (1841–1915). Bard's election in 1899 as United States senator enabled the anti-machine Republicans to sustain a continuing opposition to the Southern Pacific Railroad's political power in California. They helped nominate George C. Pardee for governor in 1902 and formed the "Lincoln–Roosevelt League". In 1910 Hiram W. Johnson won the campaign for governor under the slogan "Kick the Southern Pacific out of politics." In 1912 Johnson became the running mate for Theodore Roosevelt on the new Bull Moose Party ticket.

By 1916 the Progressives were supporting labor unions, which helped them in ethnic enclaves in the larger cities but alienated the native-stock Protestant, middle-class voters who voted heavily against Senator Johnson and President Wilson in 1916.

Political progressivism varied across the state. Los Angeles (population 102,000 in 1900) focused on the dangers posed by the Southern Pacific Railroad, the liquor trade, and labor unions; San Francisco (population 342,000 in 1900) was confronted with a corrupt union-backed political "machine" that was finally overthrown following the earthquake of 1906. Smaller cities like San Jose (which had a population of 22,000 in 1900) had somewhat different concerns, such as fruit cooperatives, urban development, rival rural economies, and Asian labor. San Diego (population 18,000 in 1900) had both the Southern Pacific and a corrupt machine.

=== World War I ===
California played a major role in terms of agriculture, industry, finance and propaganda during World War I. Its industrialized agriculture exported food to the Allies, 1914–1917, and expanded again when America entered the war in 1917. After the war ended, it shipped large quantities of food to central Europe as part of national relief efforts. Hollywood was thoroughly engaged, with feature films and training films. Attractive climate conditions led to the addition of numerous Army and Navy training camps and airfields. Construction of transports and warships boosted the economy of the Bay area.

== Organized labor ==
Organized labor was centered in San Francisco for much of the state's early history. By the opening decades of the twentieth century, labor efforts had expanded to Los Angeles, Long Beach and the Central Valley. In 1901, the San Francisco-based City Front Federation was reputed to be the strongest trade federation in the country. It grew out of intense organizational drives in every trade during the boom around the start of the 20th century.

Employers also organized during the building trades strike of 1900 and the (San Francisco) City Front Federation strike of 1901, which led to the founding of the Building Trades Council. The open shop question was at stake. Out of the City Front strike came the Union Labor Party, because workers were angry at the mayor for using the police to protect strikebreakers. Eugene Schmitz was elected mayor in 1902 on the party's ticket, making San Francisco the only town in the United States, for a time, to be run by labor. A combination of corruption and unscrupulous reformers culminated in graft prosecutions in 1907.

In 1910, Los Angeles was still an open shop, and employers in the north threatened for a new push to open San Francisco shops. Responding, labor sent delegations south in June 1910. National organizers were sent in during a lockout of 1,200 idled metal-trades workers. Then occurred an incident that would set back Los Angeles organizing for years: on October 10, 1910, a bomb exploded at the Los Angeles Times newspaper plant that killed 21 workers.

In 1912, the San Diego Common Council passed an ordinance to restrict free speech and public demonstrations over a diverse neighborhood where the local labor groups met. This columnated into the San Diego free speech fight, where police confrontations led to mass arrests, police brutality, and the lynching of dozens of people by patriotic vigilantes in reeducation camps that were overlooked by law enforcement.

In the decade following, the rapid growth of the Industrial Workers of the World (IWW, or Wobblies) in un-unionized trades, logging, wheat farming, and lumber camps began extending its efforts to mines, ports and agriculture. The IWW came to public notice after the Wheatland Hop Riot, when a sheriff's posse broke up a protest meeting and four people died. It led to the first legislation protecting field labor. The IWW was harmed by anti-union drives and prosecution of members under the California Criminal Syndicalism Act.

The IWW was also involved in the 1923 seamen's strike at San Pedro, where Upton Sinclair was arrested for reciting the Declaration of Independence. The man who became the most prominent Wobbly of all, Thomas Mooney, soon became a cause-celebre of labor and the most important political prisoner in America.

=== Labor in the 1920s ===
The Preparedness Day Bombing killed ten people and hurt labor for decades. During the 1920s, the open shop efforts succeeded through a coordinated strategy called the "American Plan". In one case, the Industrial Association of San Francisco raised over a million dollars to break the building trades strikes in 1921 that led to the collapse of the building trades unions. This employers association cut wages twice in one year, and the Metal Trades Council was defeated, losing an agreement that had been in effect since 1907. The Seamen's Union also suffered defeat in 1921.

=== Labor in the 1930s ===
==== Labor unions ====
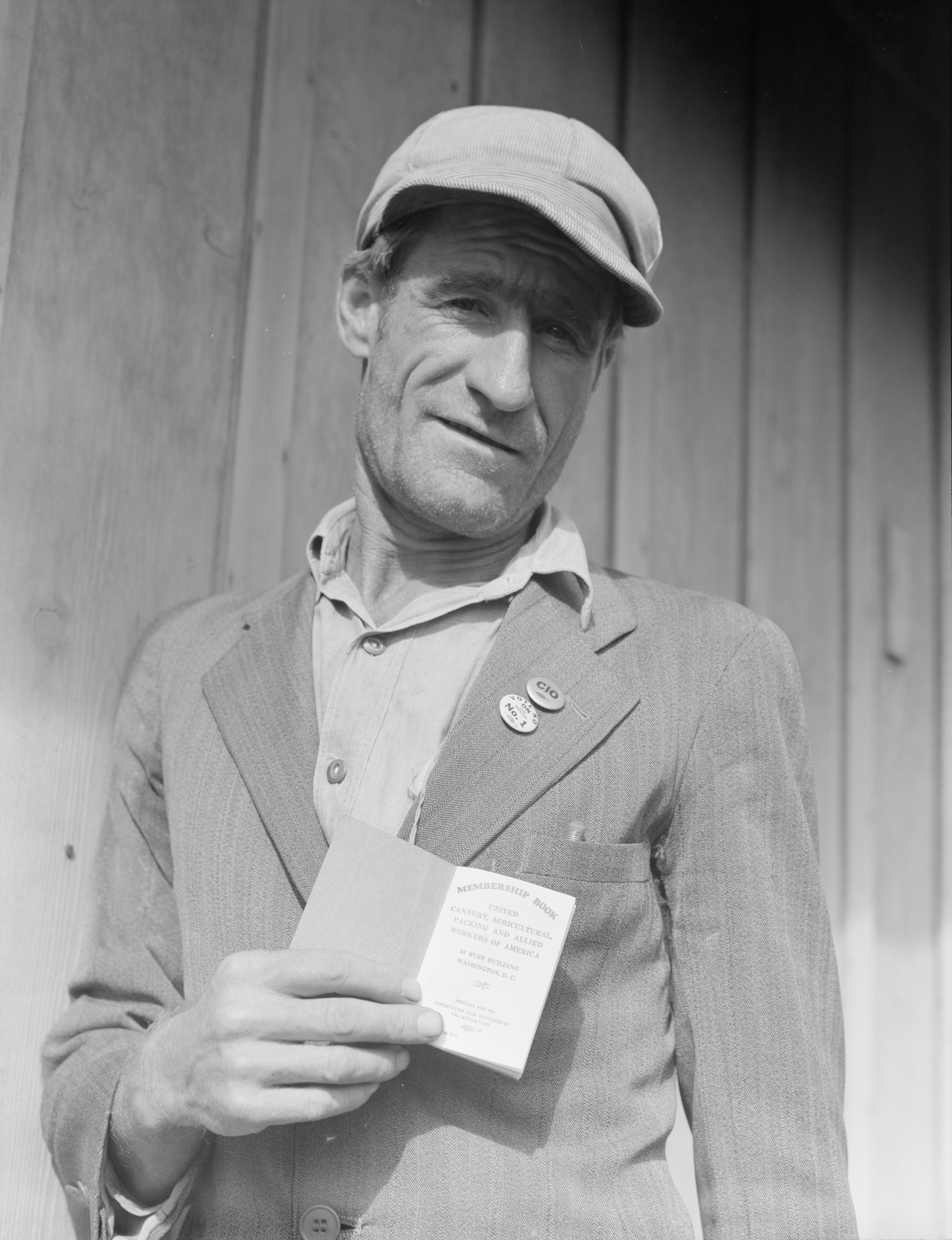
Kern County, April 1938. An agricultural worker with union membership book and pin against the 1938 anti-picketing ballot. (Photo: Dorothea Lange)

Unions grew rapidly after 1935 with political and legal support from the national New Deal and its Wagner Act of 1935. The most serious strike came in 1934 along the state's ports. In May 1934, dock workers and longshoremen along the West Coast went on strike for better hours and pay, a union hiring hall and a coast-wide contract. Communists were in control of the union, the International Longshoremen's Association (ILA), led by Harry Bridges (1901–1990).

On "Bloody Thursday", July 5, 1934, San Francisco was swept by bloody rioting. Striking maritime workers, pitting themselves against police, took control of much of the waterfront and warehouse areas of the city. Two workers were killed and hundreds were clubbed and gassed. The West Coast Waterfront Strike lasted 83 days, with longshoremen returning to work on July 31. Arbitration was agreed to, and it resulted in a victory for the strikers and the unionization of all West Coast ports in the United States.

San Francisco in the late 1930s had 120,000 union members. Longshoremen wore union buttons on their white union-made caps, Teamsters drove trucks as unionists, and fishermen, taxi drivers, streetcar conductors, motormen, newsboys, retail clerks, hotel employees, newspapermen and bootblacks all had representation. Against 30,000 trade union members in 1933–34, Los Angeles by the late thirties had 200,000, even against a severe 1938 anti-picketing ordinance. But Los Angeles became unionized in the mass production industries of aircraft, auto, rubber, and oil, and at the yards of San Pedro. Later, drives for unionization spread through musicians, teamsters, building trades, movies, actors, writers and directors.

==== Farm labor ====
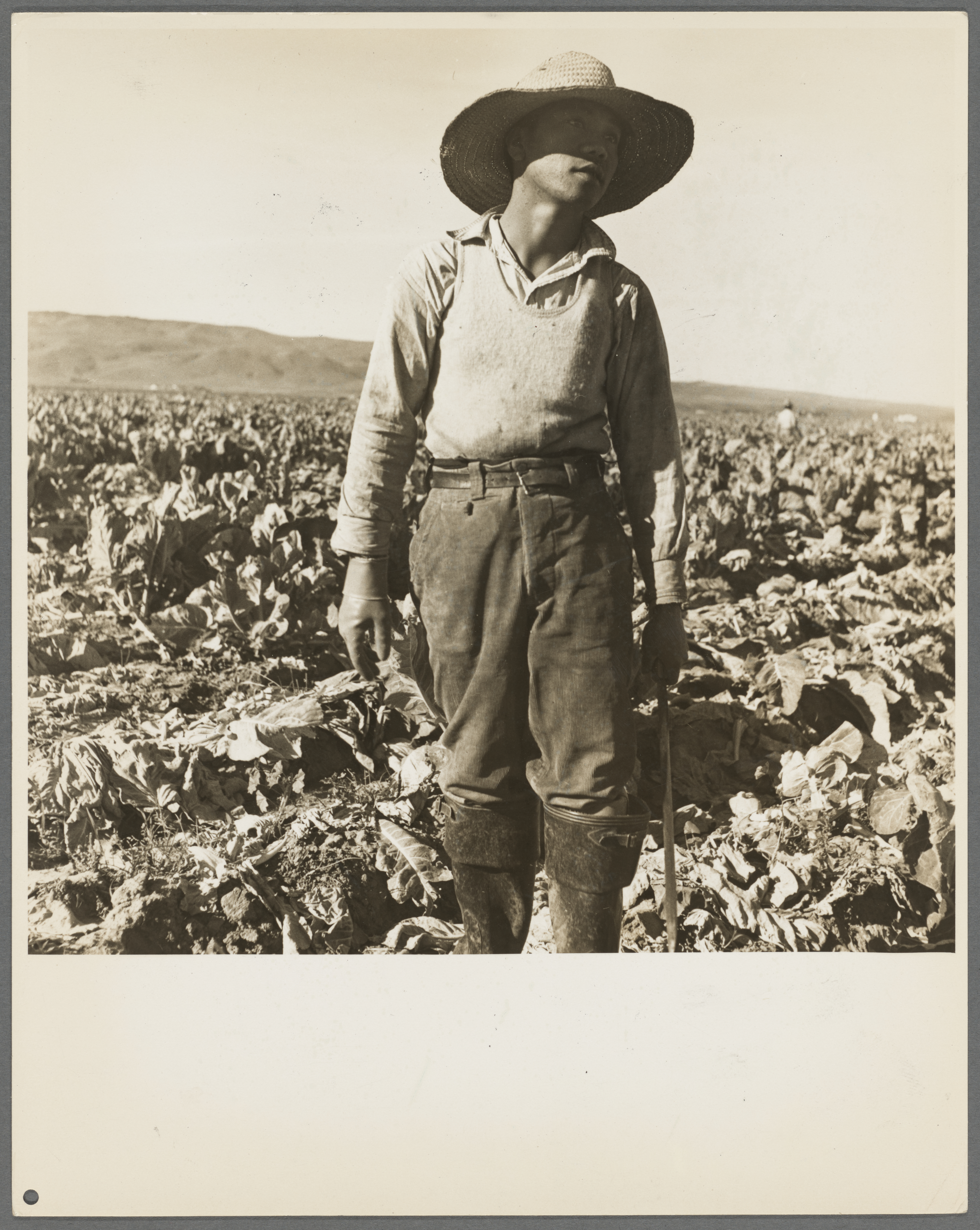
Santa Maria, March 1937. A Filipino American agricultural laborer cutting cauliflower. (Photo: Dorothea Lange)

Farm labor remained unorganized, the work brutal and underpaid. In the 1930s, 200,000 farm laborers traveled the state in tune with the seasons. Unions were accused of an "inland march" against landowners' rights when they took up the early effort to organize farm labor. A number of valley towns endorsed anti-picketing ordinances to thwart organizing.

In the 1933–1934 period, a wave of agricultural strikes flooded the Central Valley, including the Imperial Valley lettuce strike and San Joaquin Valley cotton strike. In the 1936 Salinas lettuce strike, vigilante violence shocked the nation. Again, in the spring of 1938, about three hundred men, women and children were driven by vigilantes from their homes in Grass Valley and Nevada City.

A 1938 ballot proposition against picketing, "Proposition #1", considered fascist by commentators for the state grange, became a huge political struggle. Proposition #1 failed at the polls. Soon, racist distinctions fell as California unions began to admit non-white members.

By the advent of World War II, California had an old-age assistance law, unemployment compensation, a 48-hour work week maximum for women, an apprentice law, and workplace safety rules.

==== Okies ====
"Okies" were the 250,000 hard-luck migrants who fled the Dust Bowl and depression in Oklahoma and neighboring states in the 1930s in search of a better future. Many sought farm labor jobs advertised in the Central Valley. They were harshly disparaged at the time. Police were stationed at the Arizona line to keep them out, and the state legislature passed a law to keep them out, but it was overturned by the United States Supreme Court. Historian James Gregory has explored the long-term impact of the Okies on California society. Gregory finds that most came from urban backgrounds, and one in six had been a white-collar worker. He notes that in The Grapes of Wrath, novelist John Steinbeck saw the migrants becoming active agitators for unions and the New Deal, demanding higher wages and better housing conditions. Steinbeck did not foresee that most Okies would move into well-paid jobs in war industries in the 1940s. The children and grandchildren of the Okies seldom returned to Oklahoma. They did leave the farms and became concentrated in southern California's cities and suburbs. Long-term cultural impacts include a commitment to evangelical Protestantism (especially the Pentecostals and the Southern Baptists), a love of country music, populist conservatism of the sort that boosted Ronald Reagan, and strong support for traditional moral and cultural values.

== Radical politics ==
In the 1934 California gubernatorial election, novelist Upton Sinclair was the narrowly defeated Democratic nominee, running on the platform of the socialist End Poverty in California movement, a radical response to the Great Depression. Other radical movements flourished, such as the Townsend Plan for old age pension, and "Ham and Eggs", which promised "$30 Every Thursday" to everyone over age 50. Voters narrowly rejected it in 1938, and the utopians failed to enact any panaceas; however, the movements did spawn a generation of activists on the left.

== Water projects ==
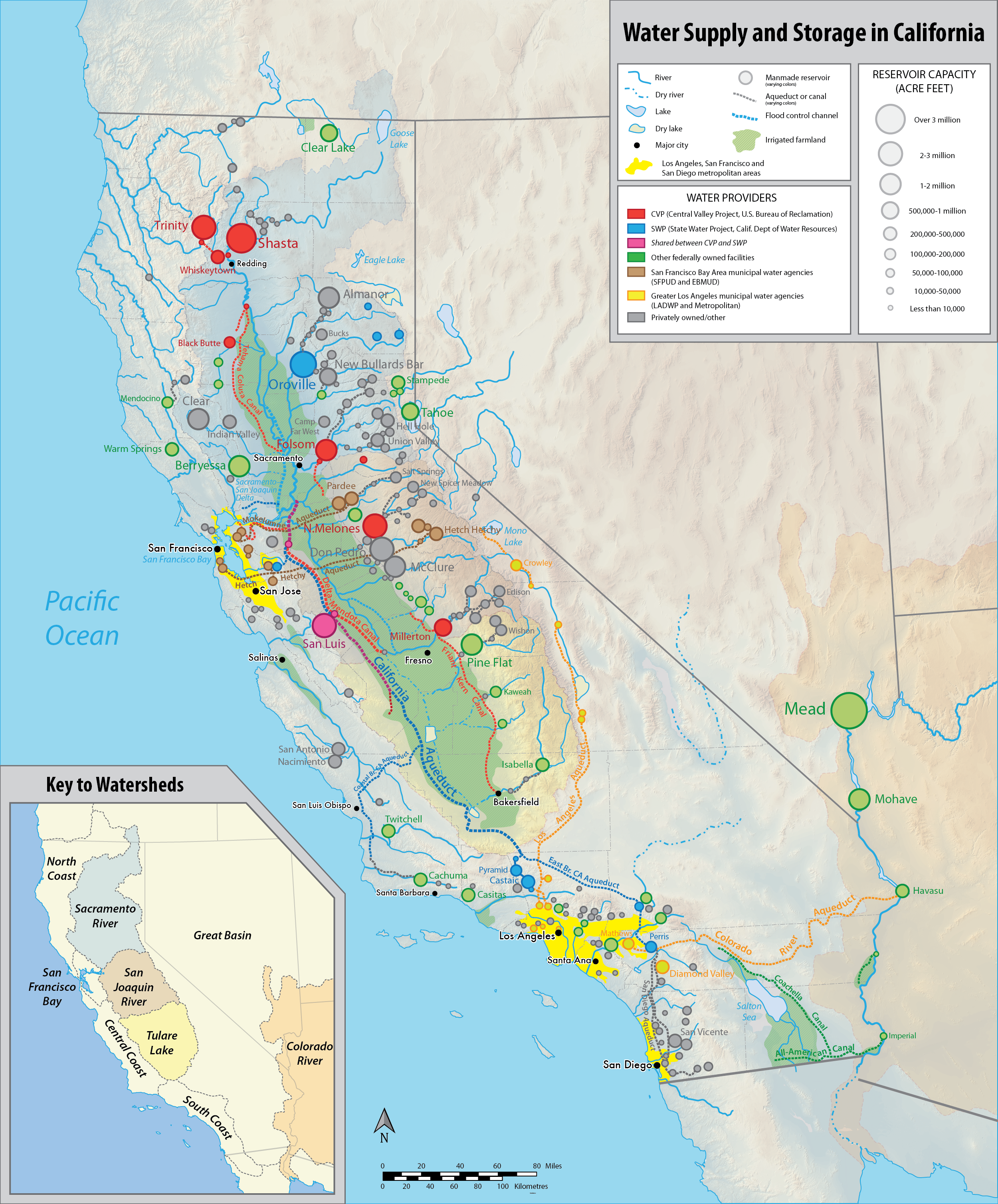
Map of water storage and delivery facilities as well as major rivers and cities in the state of California.

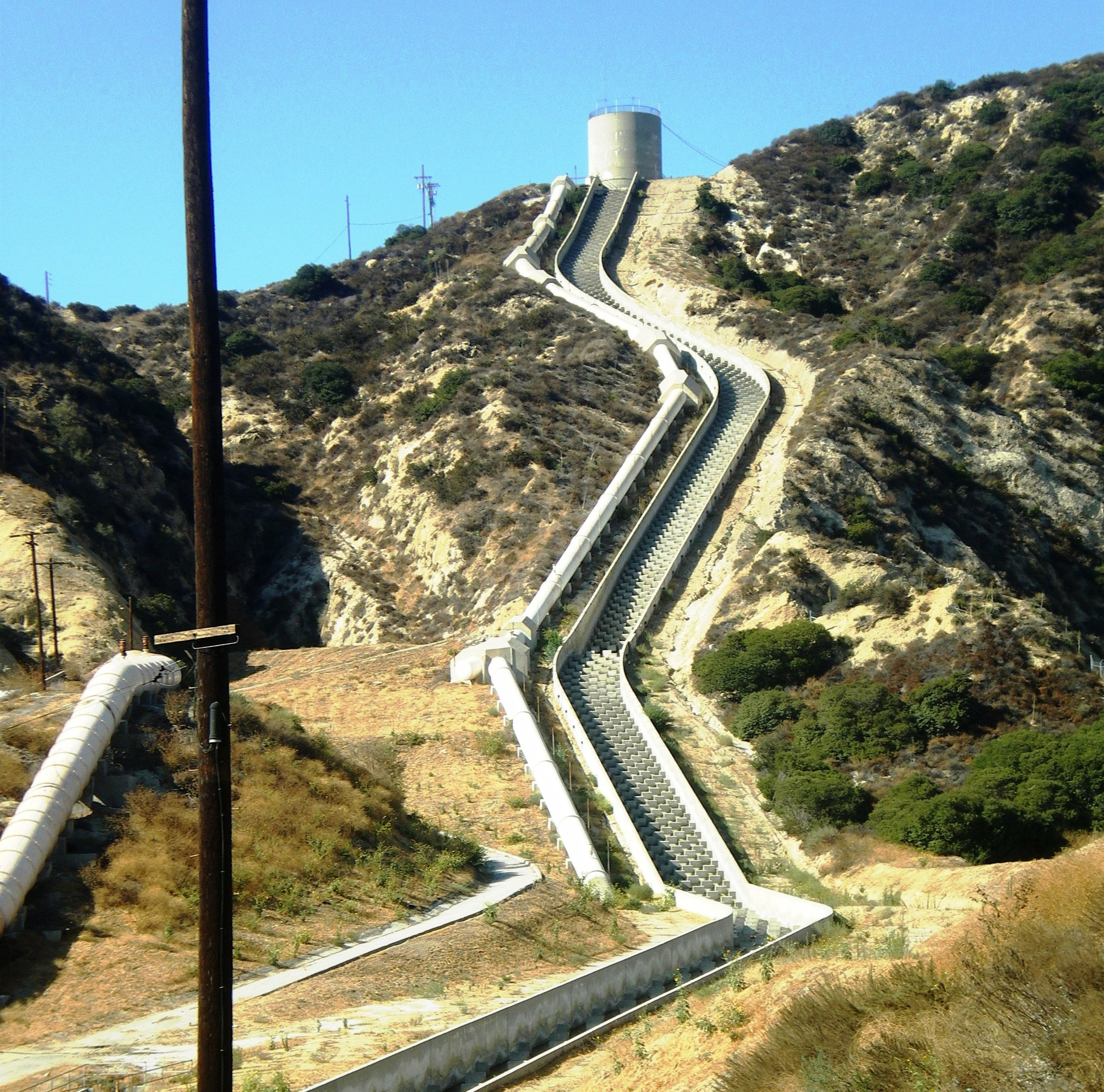
The terminus of the Second Los Angeles Aqueduct, near Sylmar.

The only way California can support its extensive population and agriculture is to store water in numerous reservoirs and use pipes, tunnels, pumps and canals to distribute it where it is needed when it is needed. Beginning before 1900, California has built extensive water projects costing many billions of dollars to store and move water where it is needed. California water comes primarily from snowfall in the Sierra Nevada in the northern part of the state during the relatively short winter from about October to March. The rest of the year typically has very little rainfall or snowfall. California weather is also prone to extended droughts that can last several years. During an average rainfall year, about 14% of the power used in California is generated by hydroelectricity.

=== Los Angeles Aqueduct ===
The Los Angeles Aqueduct runs from the Owens Valley, through the Mojave Desert and its Antelope Valley, to dry Los Angeles far to the south. The aqueduct project began in 1905 when the people of Los Angeles approved a US$1.5 million bond for the "purchase of lands and water and the inauguration of work on the aqueduct".

On June 12, 1907, a second bond was passed with a budget of US$24.5 million to fund the project. Construction began in 1908 and finished in 1913 while employing 5,000 workers during that period.

The Los Angeles aqueduct as originally constructed consisted of six storage reservoirs and 215 miles (346 km) of conduit. Beginning 3.5 miles (5.6 km) north of Black Rock Springs, the aqueduct diverts the Owens River into an unlined canal to begin its 233-mile (375 km) journey south to the Lower San Fernando Reservoir. This reservoir was later renamed the Lower Van Norman Reservoir. Creeks flowing from the eastern Sierra are diverted into the aqueduct.

The original project consisted of 24 miles (39 km) of open unlined canal, 37 miles (60 km) of lined open canal, 97 miles (156 km) of covered concrete conduit, 43 miles (69 km) of concrete tunnels, and 12.05 miles (19.39 km) of steel siphons. To build it required 120 miles (190 km) of railroad track, two hydroelectric plants, three cement plants, 170 miles (270 km) of power lines, 240 miles (390 km) of telephone line, and 500 miles (800 km) of roads. It was later expanded with the construction of the Mono Extension and the Second Los Angeles Aqueduct.

The Los Angeles Aqueduct uses gravity alone to move water and to generate electricity, so it is cost-efficient to operate. Finished in 1911, the Los Angeles Aqueduct was the brain-child of the self-taught engineer William Mulholland and is still in use today.

=== Hetch Hetchy ===
Hetch Hetchy is a valley that lies in the northwestern part of Yosemite National Park and is drained by the Tuolumne River. Starting in about 1901, San Francisco started looking for a new supply of municipal water. Following the disastrous 1906 San Francisco earthquake and fire, this search intensified, and they finally chose the Tuolumne River as the "best" available water resource. The City and County of San Francisco bought most of the water rights to the Tuolumne River watershed in 1910. The Hetch Hetchy project centered on damming the main Tuolumne River as it meandered through Hetch Hetchy's wide glacial-cut valley. The river, with its source in a perpetual glacier on 13,000-foot (4,000 m) Mount Lyell, drains 650 square miles (1,700 km^{2}) of watershed of the rugged granite mountains sloping west from the Sierra Nevada crest. The Hetch Hetchy water system's goal was providing up to 400,000,000 US gallons (1.5×10^{9} L) of water per day to San Francisco and the growing Bay Region and tap the hydroelectric power that would be generated by a dam and power stations. After a vigorous debate, the United States Congress passed the Raker Act in 1913 which authorized the building of dam(s), hydroelectricity plant and municipal water supply system inside part of Yosemite National Park. The act was signed by President Woodrow Wilson in February 1916.

A key element of the plan was a new dam and reservoir in the Hetch Hetchy Valley, but access to the area was poor, so a railroad was planned to help build the dam. The steep terrain dictated a 4-degree roadbed, roughly twice as steep as a "regular" railroad. The steep grades dictated geared-down locomotives. The first 9 miles (14 km) of the Hetch Hetchy Railroad (HHRR) were completed in 1915, and the remaining 59 miles (95 km) were completed by October 1917. Construction costs for the HHRR were about US$3 million, far less than what the city might have paid contractors to transport workers, concrete and other materials for the dam over the rough and steep terrain by 12 mule train wagons. The president of the railroad was San Francisco Mayor James Rolph, and the vice president and general manager was the construction project's chief engineer Michael O'Shaughnessy. The Hetch Hetchy Railroad was begun as a connection of the Sierra Railway at Hetch Hetchy Junction, 15 miles (24 km) west of Jamestown, and extended another 68 miles (109 km) to the Hetch Hetchy Dam (later named the O'Shaughnessy Dam after the chief engineer) site for delivery of construction workers and materials. The regular trains were supplemented by trucks converted to run on the tracks to carry unscheduled loads of men or supplies or evacuate ambulance patients. The railroad was dismantled and part of its road bed converted into a highway after the Michael O'Shaughnessy dam was completed, and the new 2,030,000-acre-foot-capacity (2.50×10^{9} m^{3}) Don Pedro Reservoir built in 1971 flooded part of the original track line.

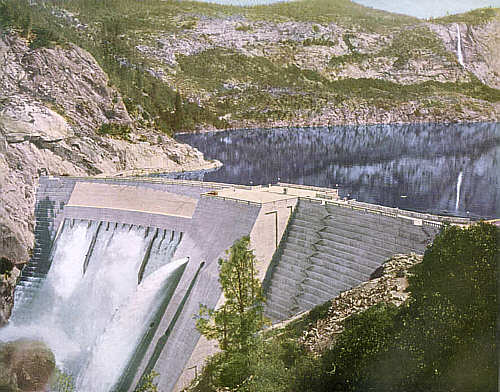
The O'Shaughnessy Dam across Hetch Hetchy Valley was initially completed in May 1923 and was raised 65.5 feet (20.0 m) higher to its 430 feet (130 m) height in 1939.

The vast Hetch Hetchy Project undertaking created the 360,000 acre-feet (440,000,000 m^{3}) Hetch Hetchy Reservoir, miles of tunnels, and a 150-mile (240 km) aqueduct to deliver the water and power lines to deliver electricity to the Bay Area. Of the many dams, reservoirs, and power plants, three were in the high country of Tuolumne County. The main dam was built in two phases. Large pipes called penstocks channeled water down the mountain to the main Moccasin Power hydroelectric plant completed in 1925 and rebuilt in 1968.

In 1923, the O'Shaughnessy Dam was completed to its initial height on the Tuolumne River, creating the Hetch Hetchy Reservoir. The dam was raised 65.5 feet (20.0 m) higher to its present 430 feet (130 m) height in 1939. The dam and reservoir are the centerpiece of the Hetch Hetchy Project, which in 1934 began to deliver water 167 miles (269 km) west to San Francisco and its client municipalities in the greater San Francisco Bay Area.

=== Central Valley Project ===
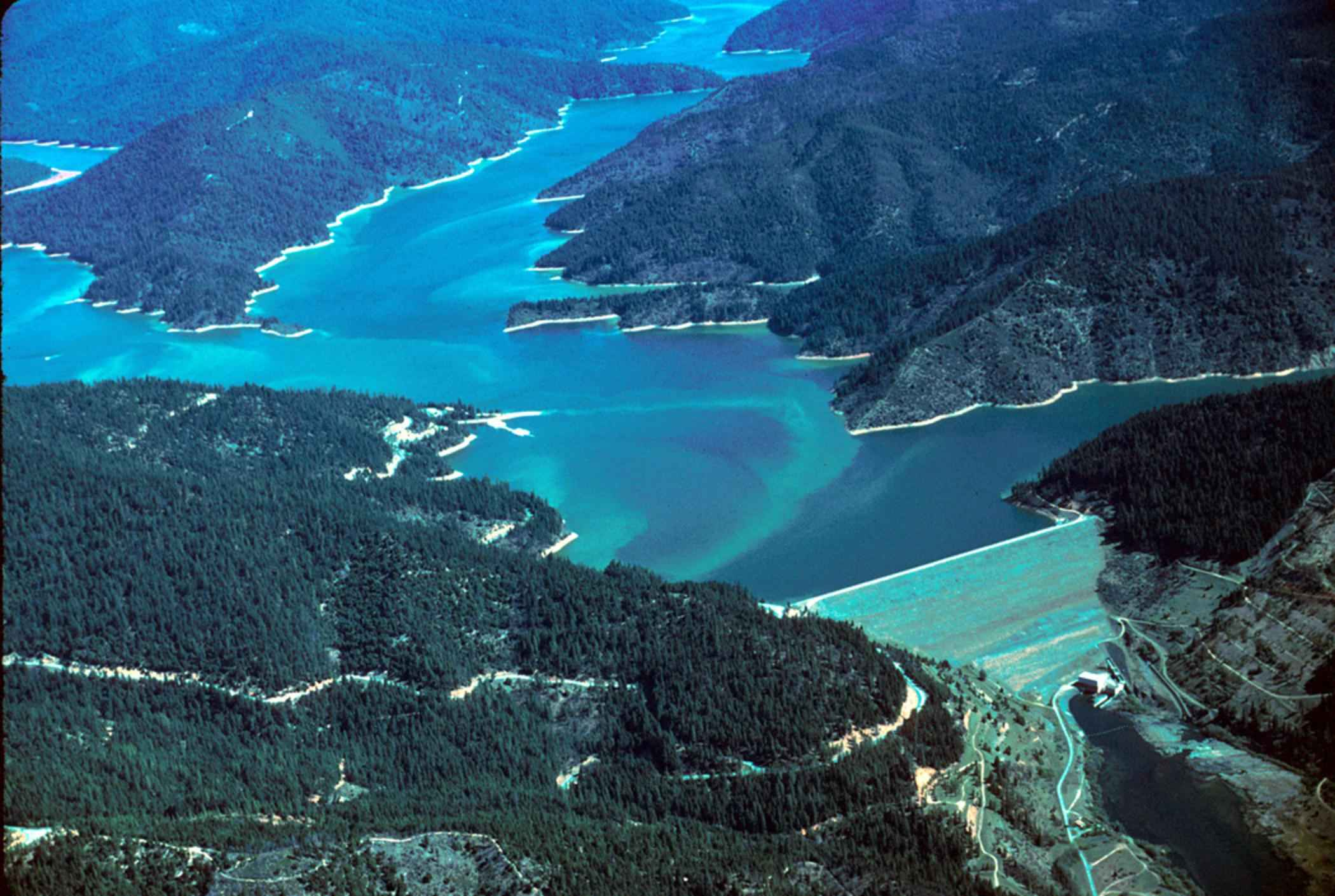
Trinity Lake stores 2,400,000 acre-feet (3.0×10^{9} m^{3}) using the Trinity Dam across the Trinity River in northern California.

Trinity Dam was the main storage feature of the Central Valley Project (CVP) proposal to divert water from the Trinity River in northwestern California to augment water supplies in the CVP service area. In 1948, the U.S. Bureau of Reclamation, which was responsible for the construction and operations of most CVP facilities, devised a plan of four dams and two tunnels to capture and store some of the flow of the Trinity River and transport it to the Sacramento River, generating a net surplus of hydroelectric power along the way. Trinity Dam was the main storage feature of the division, providing a stable flow to the Lewiston Dam, the diversion point for Trinity River waters into the Central Valley via the Trinity Tunnel. Trinity Lake was completely filled with water from the Trinity River by 1963, becoming the third largest lake in California, with 145 miles (233 km) of shoreline.

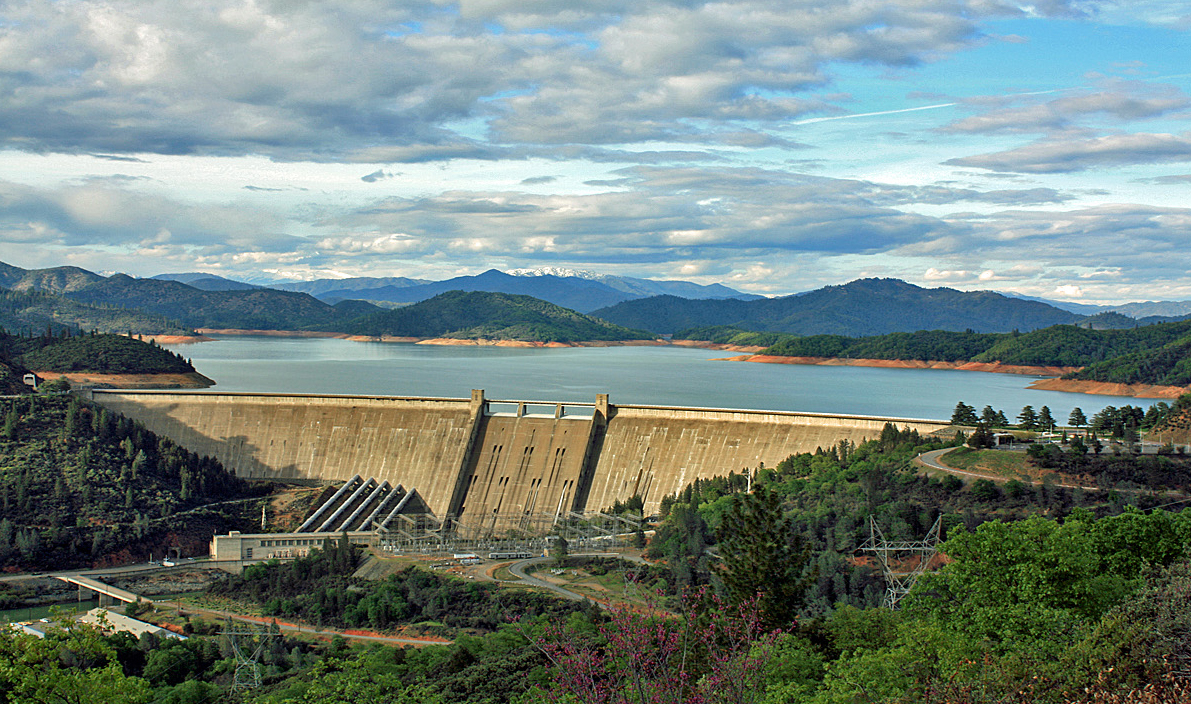
Shasta Dam across the Sacramento River holds back the 4,500,000-acre-foot (5.6×10^{9} m^{3}) Shasta Lake.

Shasta Dam is a concrete arch-gravity dam across the Sacramento River in the northern part of California, at the north end of the Sacramento Valley. The dam mainly serves long-term water storage and flood control in its 4,500,000-acre-foot (5.6×10^{9} m^{3}) reservoir, Shasta Lake. The lake has 365 miles (587 km) of mostly steep mountainous shoreline covered with tall evergreen trees and manzanita. The lake's maximum depth is 517 feet (158 m). Water released from the lake generates hydroelectric power. At 602 feet (183 m) high, the dam is the ninth-tallest dam in the United States and forms the largest reservoir in California.

Shasta Dam was envisioned as early as 1919 because of frequent floods and droughts troubling California's largest agricultural region, the Central Valley. Shasta Dam was first authorized in the 1930s as a state undertaking. However, this coincided with the Great Depression, and building of the dam was transferred to the federal Bureau of Reclamation as a public works project. Construction started in earnest in 1937 under the supervision of Chief Engineer Frank Crowe. During its building, the dam provided thousands of much-needed jobs; it was finished 26 months ahead of schedule in 1945. When completed, the dam was the second-tallest in the United States after Hoover, and was considered one of the greatest engineering feats of all time.

Even before its dedication, Shasta Dam served an important role in World War II, providing electricity to California factories, and it still plays a vital part in the management of state water resources. However, it has brought about major changes to the environment and ecology of the Sacramento River, and met with controversy over its significant destruction of Native American tribal lands. In recent years, there has been debate over whether or not to raise the dam in order to allow for increased water storage and hydropower generation.

Pardee Dam is a 345-foot-high (105 m) structure across the Mokelumne River on the boundary between Amador and Calaveras counties, in the foothills of the Sierra Nevada approximately 30 miles (48 km) northeast of Stockton. The Pardee Reservoir impounds 210,000 acre-feet (260,000,000 m^{3}) of water when it is full.

Construction on the Mokelumne Aqueduct and Pardee Dam began in 1926, and by 1929 the 345-foot-high (105 m) concrete arch Pardee Dam and the First Mokelumne Aqueduct, consisting of a single pipeline, were completed. The first deliveries to the Bay Area from the 210,000-acre-foot (260,000,000 m^{3}) reservoir were made on June 23, 1929. At the time of completion, Pardee Dam was the tallest in the world (this record was surpassed one year later by Diablo Dam in Washington). In 1949, a second pipeline was built, and in 1963 the third pipeline was constructed, bringing the aqueduct to its present capacity. In 1964, the second major dam and reservoir on the Mokelumne River, the Camanche Dam and 410,000-acre-foot (510,000,000 m^{3}) Camanche Reservoir, were completed below Pardee. The Mokelumne Aqueduct and dam(s), run by the East Bay Municipal Utility District (EBMUD), is the primary water source for 35 communities in Alameda and Contra Costa counties, including Berkeley and Oakland. EBMUD holds water rights to almost all of the 30,000 acres (120 km^{2}) in the Mokelumne River watershed and 25,000 acres (100 km^{2}) in other watersheds. EBMUD also has an American River water right that could be sent to the Mokelumne Aqueduct through the Folsom South Canal.

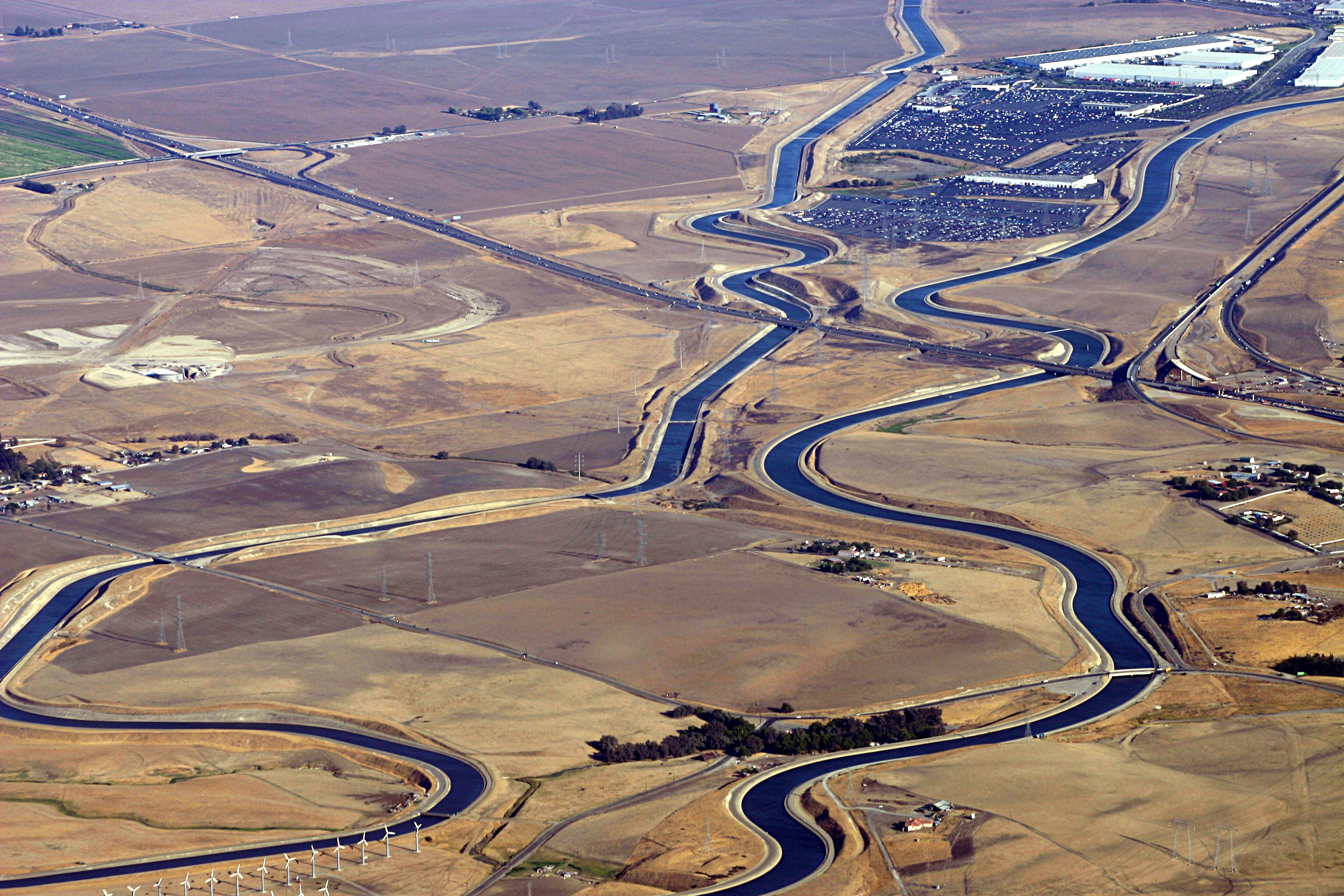
The Delta–Mendota Canal (left) and the California Aqueduct (right) near Tracy.

The California Aqueduct is a system of canals, tunnels, and pipelines that conveys water collected from the Sierra Nevada mountains and valleys of northern and central California to southern California. The Department of Water Resources (DWR) operates and maintains the California Aqueduct, including the two largest pumped-storage hydroelectric plants in California, Castaic and Gianelli. Gianelli is located at the base of San Luis Dam, which forms San Luis Reservoir, the largest off-stream reservoir in the United States. The Castaic Power Plant is located at the northern end of Castaic Lake, while Castaic Dam is located at the southern end.

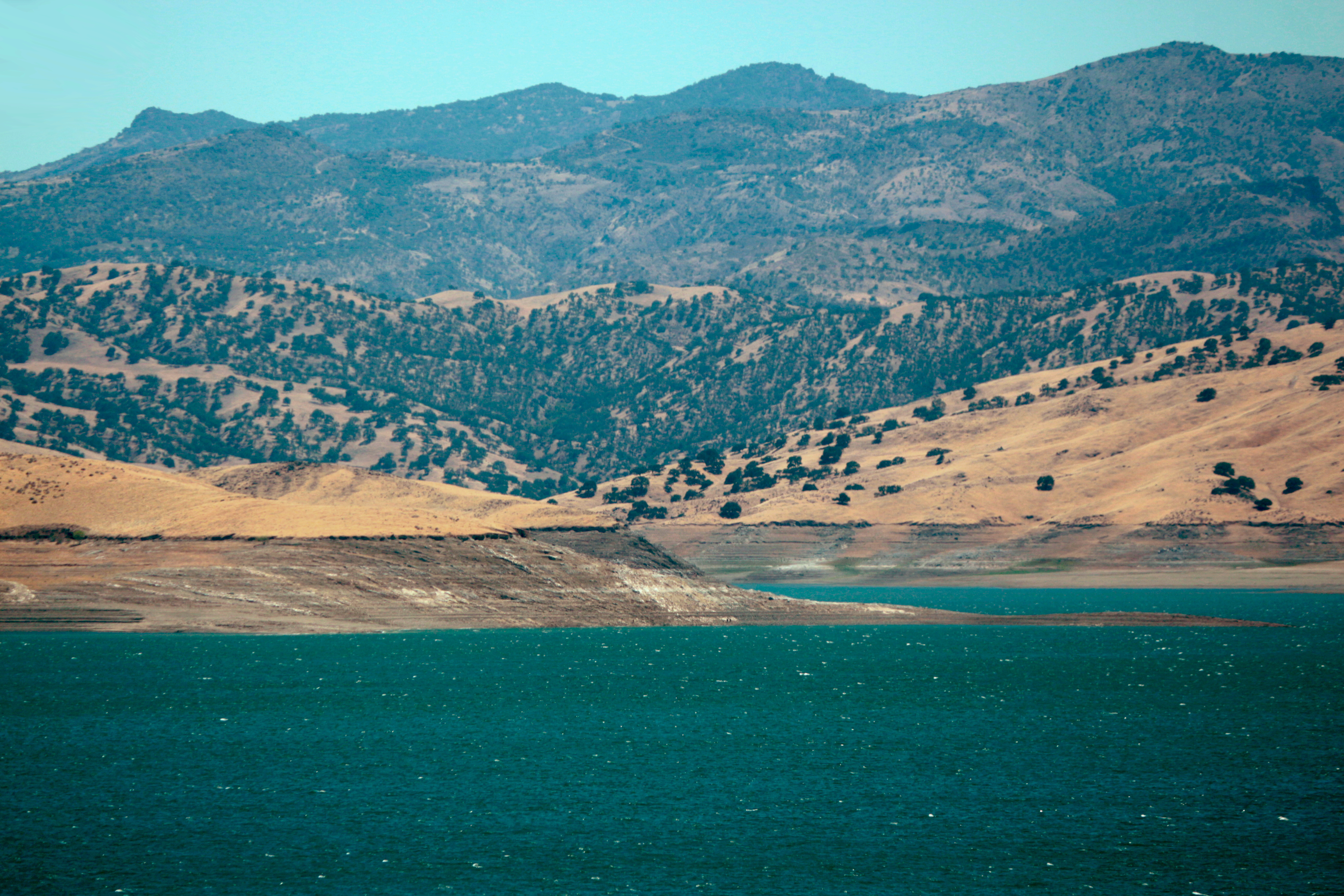
San Luis Reservoir in July 2021.

The aqueduct begins at the Sacramento–San Joaquin River Delta at the Banks Pumping Plant, which pumps from the Clifton Court Forebay. Water is pumped by the Banks Pumping Plant to the Bethany Reservoir, which serves as a forebay for the South Bay Aqueduct via the South Bay Pumping Plant. From the Bethany Reservoir, the aqueduct flows by gravity approximately 60 miles (97 km) to the O'Neill Forebay at the San Luis Reservoir. From the O'Neill Forebay, it flows approximately 16 miles (26 km) to the Dos Amigos Pumping Plant. After Dos Amigos, the aqueduct flows about 95 miles (153 km) to where the Coastal Branch splits from the "main line". The split is approximately 16 miles (26 km) south-southeast of Kettleman City. After the Coastal Branch, the line continues by gravity another 66 miles (106 km) to the Buena Vista Pumping Plant. From the Buena Vista, it flows approximately 27 miles (43 km) to the Teerink Pumping Plant. After Teerink it flows about 2.5 miles (4.0 km) to the Chrisman Pumping Plant. Chrisman is the last pumping plant before the Edmonston Pumping Plant, which is 13 miles (21 km) from Chrisman. South of the plant the west branch splits off in a southwesterly direction to serve the Los Angeles Basin. At the Edmonston Pumping Plant it is pumped 1,926 feet (587 m) over the Tehachapi Mountains.

Water flows through the aqueduct in a series of abrupt rises and gradual falls. The water flows down a long segment, built at a slight grade, and arrives at a pumping station powered by Path 66 or Path 15. The pumping station raises the water, where it again gradually flows downhill to the next station. However, where there are substantial drops, the water's potential energy is recaptured by hydroelectric plants. The initial pumping station fed by the Sacramento River Delta raises the water 240 ft (73 m), while a series of pumps culminating at the Edmonston Pumping Plant raises the water 1,926 ft (587 m) over the Tehachapi Mountains. The Edmonston Pumping station requires so much power that several power lines off Path 15 and Path 26 are needed to ensure proper operation of the pumps.

A typical section has a concrete-lined channel 40 feet (12 m) at the base and an average water depth of about 30 feet (9.1 m). The widest section of the aqueduct is 110 feet (34 m), and the deepest is 32 feet (9.8 m). Channel capacity is 13,100 cubic feet per second (370 m^{3}/s), and the largest pumping plant capacity at Dos Amigos is 15,450 cubic feet per second (437 m^{3}/s).

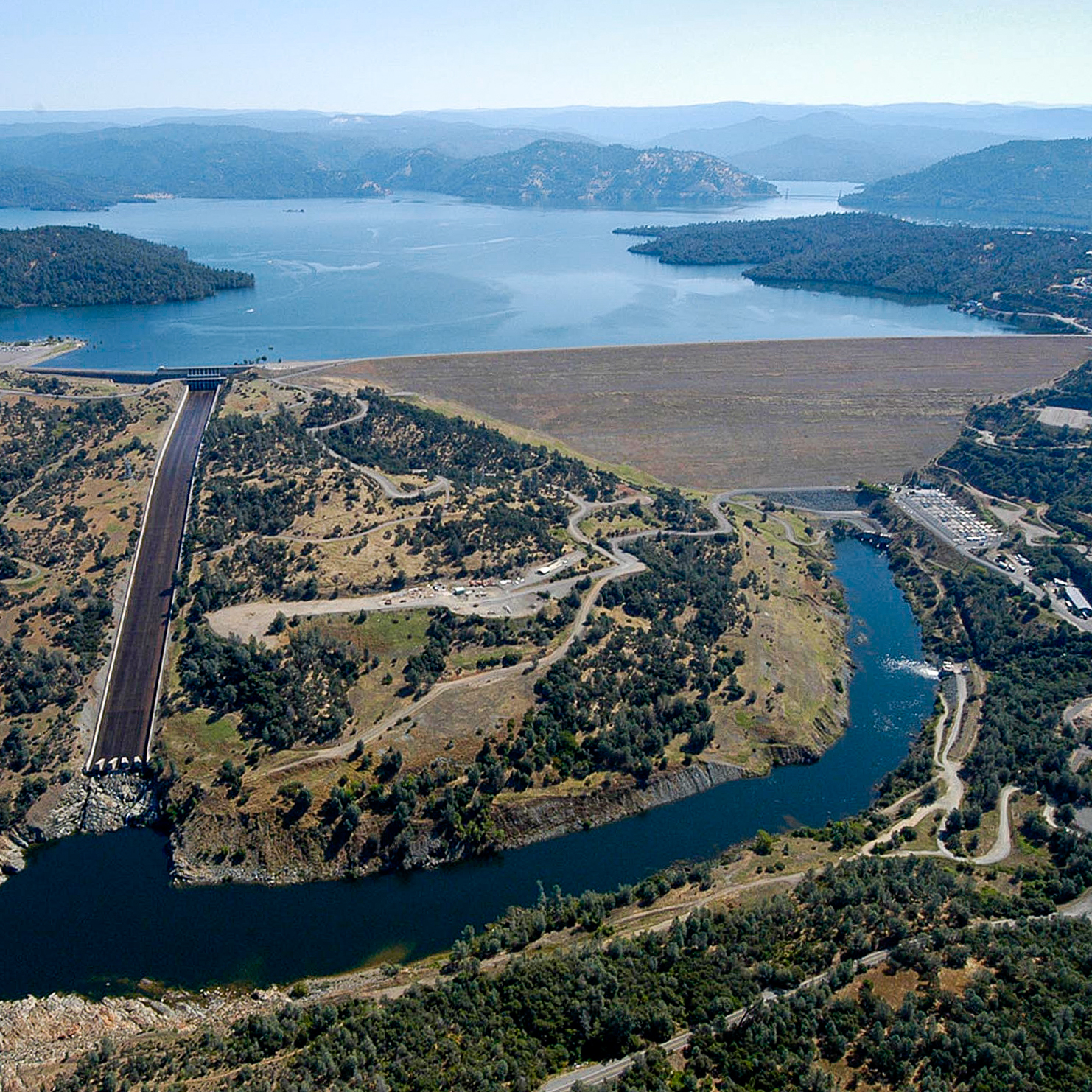
Oroville Dam, at 770 feet (230 m) is the highest embankment dam in the U.S., and at 3,500,000 acre-feet (4.3×10^{9} m^{3}) Lake Oroville is 60% of the SWP's total water storage capacity. It is located on the Feather River.

The California State Water Project, commonly known as the SWP, is a water management project under the supervision of the California Department of Water Resources. The SWP is the world's largest publicly built and operated water and power development and conveyance system, providing drinking water for more than 23 million people and generating an average of 6,500 GWh of hydroelectricity annually. However, as the largest single consumer of power in the state, its net output in an "average" rainfall year is 5,100 GWh.

The SWP collects water from rivers in northern California and redistributes it to the water-scarce but populous south through a network of aqueducts, pumping stations and hydroelectric plants. About 70% of the water provided by the project is used for urban areas and industry in southern California and the San Francisco Bay Area, and 30% is used for irrigation in the Central Valley. To reach southern California, the water must be pumped 2,000 feet (610 m) over the Tehachapi Mountains—the highest single water lift in the world. The SWP shares many facilities with the federal Central Valley Project (CVP), which primarily serves agricultural users. Water can be interchanged between SWP and CVP canals as needed to meet peak requirements for project constituents. The SWP provides estimated annual benefits of $400 billion to California's economy.

Since its inception in 1960, the SWP has required the construction of 21 dams and more than 700 miles (1,100 km) of canals, pipelines and tunnels, although these constitute only a fraction of the facilities originally proposed. As a result, the project has only delivered an average of 2.4 million acre-feet (3.0 km^{3}) annually, as compared to total entitlements of 4.23 million acre-feet (5.22 km^{3}). Environmental concerns caused by the dry-season removal of water from the Sacramento–San Joaquin River Delta, a sensitive estuary region, have often led to further reductions in water delivery. Work continues today to expand the SWP's water delivery capacity while finding solutions for the environmental impacts of water diversion.

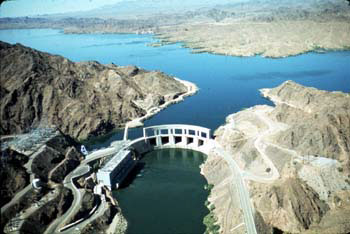
Parker Dam on Lake Havasu, where Colorado River waters are initially drawn into the Colorado River Aqueduct water distribution system.

The Colorado River Aqueduct, or CRA, is a 242-mile (389 km) water conveyance in southern California, operated by the Metropolitan Water District of Southern California (MWD). The aqueduct impounds water from the Colorado River at Lake Havasu on the California–Arizona border. This water is then transferred west by pumping stations, reservoirs, and canals across the Mojave and Colorado deserts to the east side of the Santa Ana Mountains. It is one of the primary sources of drinking water for southern California.

Originally conceived by William Mulholland and designed by Chief Engineer Frank E. Weymouth of the MWD, it was the largest public works project in southern California during the Great Depression. The project employed 30,000 people over an eight-year period and as many as 10,000 at one time.

The system is composed of two reservoirs, five pumping stations, 63 miles (101 km) of canals, 92 miles (148 km) of tunnels, and 84 miles (135 km) of buried conduit and siphons. Average annual throughput is 1,200,000 acre-feet (1.5 km^{3}).

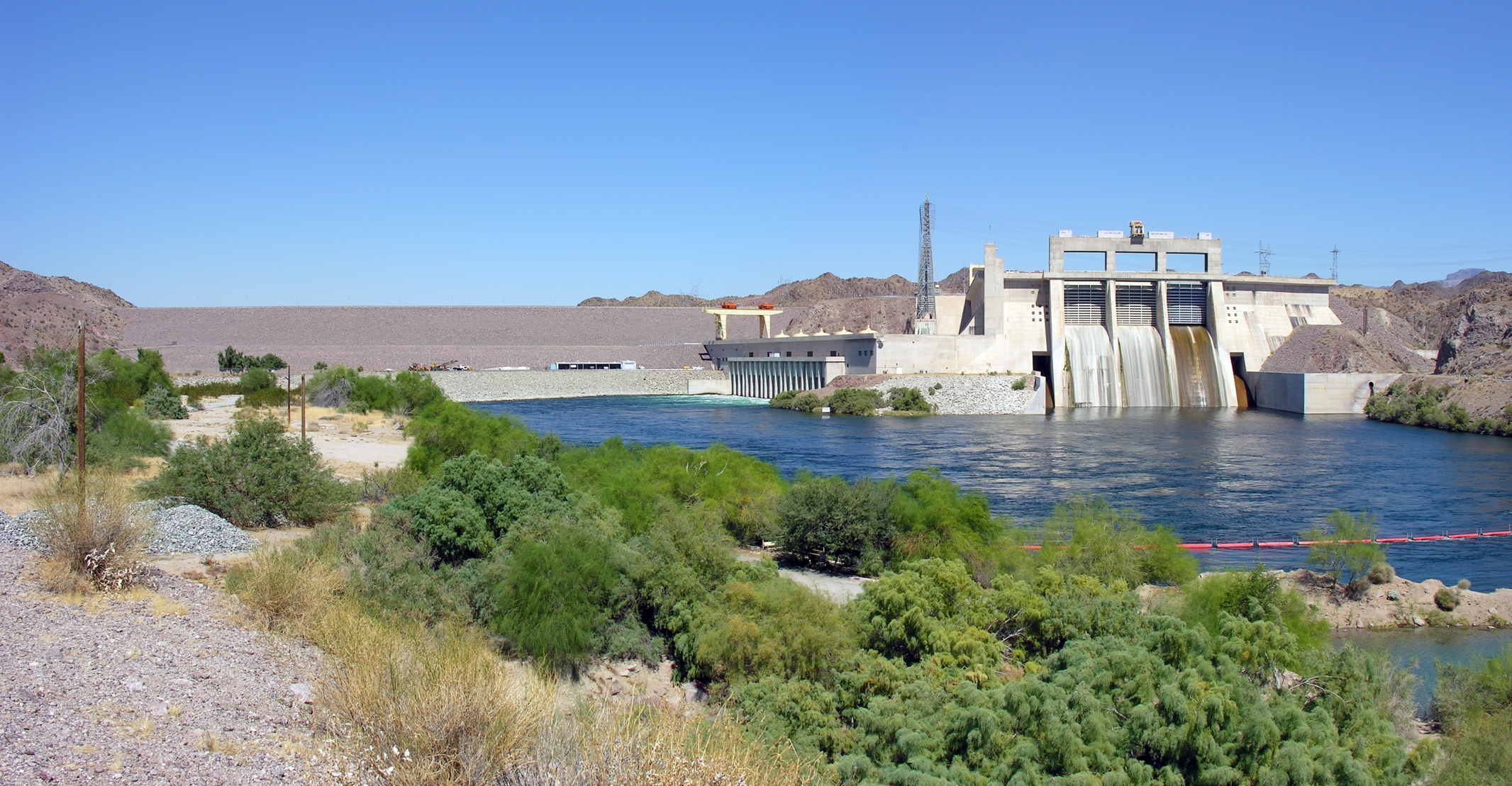
Davis Dam on the Colorado River.

Davis Dam is located on the Colorado River about 70 miles (110 km) downstream from Hoover Dam. Davis Dam stretches across the border between Arizona and Nevada and impounds the Colorado River to form Lake Mohave. The United States Bureau of Reclamation owns and operates the dam, which was completed in 1951. Davis Dam is a zoned earth fill dam with a concrete spillway, 1,600 feet (490 m) in length at the crest, and 200 feet (61 m) high. The earth fill dam begins on the Nevada side, but it does not extend to the Arizona side. Instead, there is an inlet formed by earth and concrete. At the end of the inlet is the spillway. The power plant is on the Arizona side of the inlet, perpendicular to the dam. This is a very unusual design. The hydroelectric plant generates between 1 and 2 terawatt-hours of electricity annually. The plant has a capacity of 251 MW (337,000 hp), and the tops of its five Francis turbines are visible from outside the plant. The plant's hydraulic head is 136 feet (41 m). The dam's purpose is to generate hydroelectricity and regulate water releases into the Colorado River for use downstream by California, Arizona and Mexico.

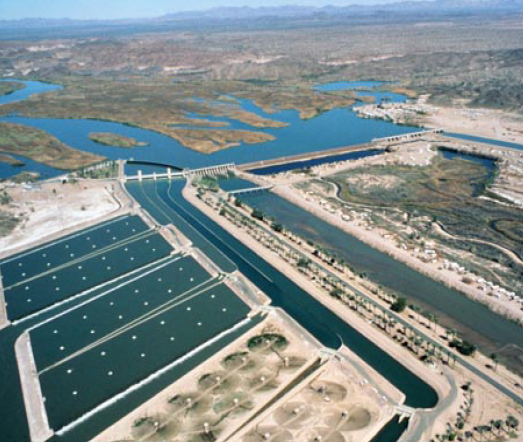
Imperial Dam on the Colorado River at the head of the All-American Canal.

Imperial Dam is a concrete slab and buttress, ogee weir structure across the Colorado River on the California–Arizona border, 18 miles (29 km) northeast of Yuma. Completed in the 1938, the dam retains the waters of the Colorado River in the Imperial Reservoir before desilting and diversion into the All-American Canal, the Gila River, and the Yuma Project aqueduct. Between 1932 and 1940, the Imperial Irrigation District relied on the Inter-California Canal, the Imperial Canal, and the Alamo River.

Imperial Dam was built to replace the Laguna Diversion Dam, built in 1901–1915, which was the first dam and reclamation project on the Colorado River. Imperial Dam was built with three sections; the gates of each section hold back the water to help divert the water towards the desilting plant. Three giant desilting basins and 72 770-foot (230 m) scrapers hold and desilt the water; the removed silt is carried away by six sludge pipes running under the Colorado River that dump the sediment into the California sluiceway, which returns the silt to the Colorado River. The water is now directed back towards one of the three sections which divert the water into one of the three channels. About 90% of the volume of the Colorado River is diverted into the canals at this location. Diversions can top 40,000 cubic feet (1,100 m^{3}) per second—more than 50 times the flow of the Rio Grande.

The Gila River and the Yuma Project aqueduct branch off toward Arizona, while the All-American Canal branches southwards for 37 miles (60 km) before reaching its headworks on the California border and bending west toward the Imperial Valley.

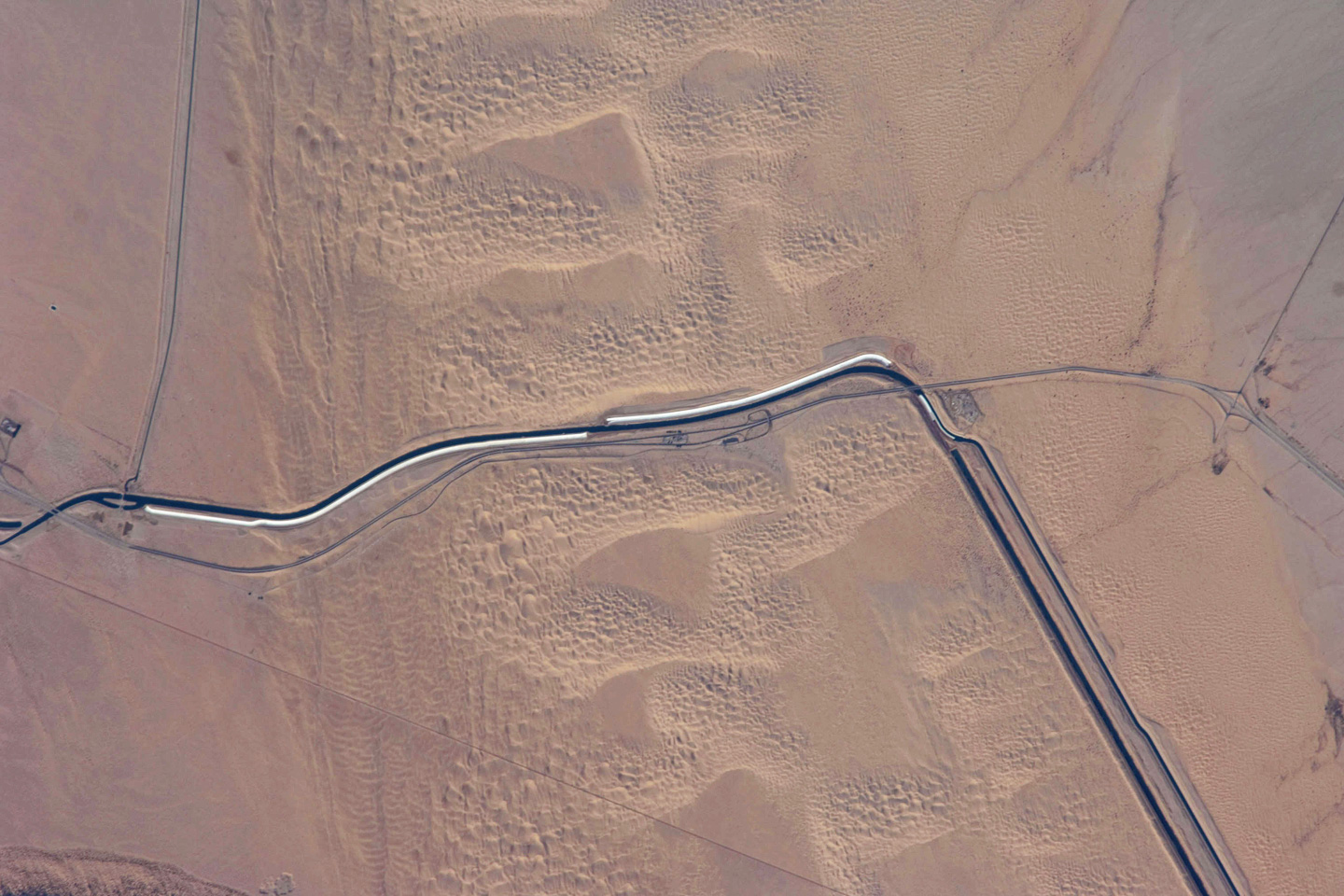
View of the 9.3 miles (15 km) Coachella Canal (part of the All-American Canal) just west of Yuma, Arizona; north is to the upper right.

The All-American Canal is an 80-mile-long (130 km) aqueduct in southeastern California. It conveys water from the Colorado River into the Imperial Valley and to nine cities. It is the Imperial Valley's only water source, and replaced the Alamo Canal, which was located mostly in Mexico. The Imperial Dam, about 30 miles (48 km) northeast of Yuma, Arizona, on the Colorado River, diverts water into the All-American Canal, which runs to just west of Calexico, California, before its last branch heads mostly north into the Imperial Valley. Five smaller canals branching off the All-American Canal move water into the Imperial Valley. These canal systems irrigate up to 630,000 acres (250,000 ha) of good cropland and have made possible a greatly increased crop yield in this area, originally one of the driest on earth. It is the largest irrigation canal in the world, carrying a maximum of 26,155 cubic feet per second (740.6 m^{3}/s). Agricultural runoff from the All-American Canal drains into the Salton Sea. The All-American Canal runs parallel to the Mexico–United States border for several miles.

The Sacramento Deep Water Ship Channel (also known as the "Sacramento River Deep Water Ship Channel" or "SRDWSC") is a canal from the Port of Sacramento to the Sacramento River, which flows into San Francisco Bay. It was completed by the United States Army Corps of Engineers in 1963. The channel is about 30 feet (9.1 m) deep, 200 feet (61 m) wide, and 43 miles (69 km) long.

The Port of Sacramento has always been a significant port on the West Coast of the United States since the 1849 California Gold Rush. It was originally served primarily by paddle steamers which carried cargo from San Francisco Bay up the Sacramento River to Sacramento. Today it receives far less traffic than larger ports and handles primarily agricultural products and other bulk goods rather than containers, which now dominate the shipping market.

Other engineering feats were the building of Hoover Dam, which though in Nevada, provides power and water to southern California.

Another project was the draining of Tulare Lake, which during high water was the largest freshwater lake fully inside an American state. This created a large wet area amid the dry San Joaquin Valley, and swamps abounded at its shores. By the 1970s, it was completely drained, but it attempts to resurrect itself during heavy rains.

=== Water recycling ===
The recycling of treated municipal wastewater has become a significant part of California's water supply. The different water agencies in California were recycling over 770,000 acre-feet (950,000,000 m^{3}) as of 2009, the date of the last survey. Some of the many uses for recycled water are: golf course irrigation 7%, landscape irrigation 17%, agricultural irrigation 37%, commercial reuse of water 7%, industrial uses 7%, geothermal energy production 1%, seawater intrusion barrier via fresh water injections 7%, groundwater recharge by well injection and flotation ponds 12%, recreational impoundments 4%, and natural wetland systems/restoration 4%. The stated goal is the recycling of 1,600,000 acre-feet (2.0×10^{9} m^{3}) of treated municipal wastewater.

On March 14, 2014, the State Water Board approved $800 million in financial incentives for recycled water projects. These projects typically take years to get approved and built.

The Water Replenishment District of Southern California (WRD), in service since 1959, is one of the more aggressive agencies that use recycled water for their groundwater replenishment and seawater intrusion barriers. To prevent seawater contamination of their groundwater, they have several sets of injection wells that inject clean water between their aquifer and the sea. This creates a local water barrier to seawater intrusion. The other mechanism is to make sure the water level is above sea level.

Well users, including municipal water users, in the WRD area pump about 250,000 acre-feet (310,000,000 m^{3}) of water per year out of their aquifer. This is an "overdraft" of about 150,000 acre-feet (190,000,000 m^{3}) of water over what their underground aquifer can "normally" refill. To replace this "overdraft" of water into the aquifer, they have flotation ponds that catch rain runoff water, and supplement with other water they either buy or recycle, then let the water soak into the ground (spreading water) to help replenish the water in the aquifer(s). In addition they buy Colorado River water that is shipped via the Colorado River Aqueduct, and they accept part of the treated municipal wastewater of the about 4,000,000 people in their district and treat it to additional purity and sanitation levels by using reverse osmosis and advanced filtering. Their largest tertiary water treatment facility is the Leo J. Vander Lans Advanced Water Treatment facility. The water out of this facility is better than the water that comes out of the "average" municipal water treatment facility. To finance their water recycling projects WRD charges $268 per acre-foot of water pumped out, which generates about $65,000,000/year. WRD is now on a project (WIN) to enlarge their water treatment facilities to take larger quantities of treated municipal wastewater and treat enough of it that they will not have to buy Colorado River water. Overall it is estimated that this project provides over 40% of the water used in the southern California district served by the WRD.

Among the many water recycling projects just being completed, the South Bay Water Recycling program distributes recycled water to more than 400 customers in the San Jose, area for irrigation, industrial and other purposes. In northern California, two agencies have teamed up to develop the San Ramon Valley Recycled Water Program. Jointly sponsored by the Dublin San Ramon Services District and the East Bay Municipal Utility District, the program will provide recycled water to municipal parks, golf courses, business parks, greenbelts and roadways. The Irvine Ranch Water District has built a dual water system, which supplies recycled water to commercial high rises for use in flushing toilets and urinals. A West Basin Municipal Water District project distributes recycled water to more than 85 customers, including Chevron and Mobil refineries. Monterey County Water Recycling Projects provide recycled water for agricultural irrigation to help ease demands on an overused groundwater aquifer. The Padre Dam Water Recycling Facility was expanded to recycle 2 million gallons/day for turf irrigation at parks, golf courses and other commercial and industrial facilities.

In the San Diego region, 16 water agencies are planning to use over 32,300 acre-feet (39,800,000 m^{3}) of recycled water per year in order to meet the region's water supply demand. The city of Carlsbad's new recycled water treatment and distribution system will deliver approximately 3,000 acre-feet (3,700,000 m^{3}) per year of recycled water to customers located in that community. In the southern portion of San Diego County, the Otay Water District is constructing a distribution system to deliver an estimated 5,000 acre-feet (6,200,000 m^{3}) per year of recycled water by 2030 purchased from the city of San Diego's South Bay Water Recycling Plant. In southern California, the Elsinore Valley Municipal Water District is using recycled water to help replenish and enhance Lake Elsinore.

The Orange County Sanitation and Orange County Water Districts are planning for treated wastewater, currently discharged into the ocean, to undergo microfiltration, reverse osmosis and ultraviolet disinfection. The purified water will be equivalent in quality to distilled water and exceed all state and federal drinking water standards. The purified water will be pumped to spreading ponds near the Santa Ana River for percolation into the groundwater basin, with some injected through injection wells along the coast as a barrier to seawater intrusion. Like the WRD projects in southern California, the Orange County Water District has amassed a long record of successfully recycling water with its Water Factory 21.

=== Desalination projects ===
On December 24, 2012, the San Diego County Water Authority announced they had sold $734 million worth of tax-free bonds at 4.38% interest to build the Carlsbad Seawater Desalination Project, the largest seawater desalination plant in the Western Hemisphere. The project is located near Encina Power Station in Carlsbad, and is expected to produce about 56,000 acre-feet (69,000,000 m^{3}) of water per year by 2016 when the project is completed. The plant is expected to use over 17,000 reverse osmosis racks. The project includes $80 million in San Diego Water Authority upgrades to its own facilities. A 10-mile (16 km) pipeline is being built to deliver desalinated water into its Twin Oaks Valley Water Treatment Plant near San Marcos. The developer Poseidon Resources is building the plant and pipeline in a joint venture with contractor Kiewit Shea Desalination. The project will deliver up to 50 million gallons a day of drought-proof, highly reliable water that will become a core, day-to-day resource for the region. It is projected to meet about 7% of San Diego County's demand in 2020. The total cost is projected at $1,849 to $2,257 per acre-foot. The additional cost of desalinating seawater will add $5 to $7 per month to ratepayers' bills—about a 10% increase. Poseidon has also proposed the Huntington Beach Desalination Plant.

The 2014 drought has brought reconsideration of the Charles Meyer Desalination Facility that was built for $34 million in the early 1990s in Santa Barbara but was later essentially mothballed when the drought was over. There are early discussions about investing around $20 million more to upgrade and restart the desalination plant. They have permits to make about 3,000 acre-feet (3,700,000 m^{3}) of desalinated water per year, but they will incur additional costs to pump their desalinated water to existing higher elevation reservoirs if they reactivate the plant. The projected costs (2014) were about $3,000 per acre foot.

The small city of Sand City, located on the Monterey Peninsula, struck out on its own in 2007 to develop a small desalination plant. The city partnered with California American Water for the $14 million project, which started producing 300 acre feet of freshwater a year in 2010. The cost and water are shared with other nearby small communities.

=== California Department of Water Resource data ===
The web site run by the California Department of Water Resources lists the present reservoir storage levels for each of California's major reservoirs. Individual reservoir capacities and percent of full are given for the major reservoirs. As of April 3, 2014, they had 12,682,744 acre-feet (1.5643934×10^{10} m^{3}) of water stored, or about 65% of the 19,490,257 acre-feet (2.4040878×10^{10} m^{3}) of water they usually would have at that time of year.

== California's highway system ==
Automobile travel became important after 1910 when motor cars and trucks began to become common. Before that, nearly all long-distance travel was by railroad or stagecoach, with horse- or mule-drawn wagons hauling the freight. California started to maintain state roads in 1895. Construction of a large connected state highway system began in 1912. The last large addition to the state highway system was made by the California State Assembly in 1959, after which only minor changes have been made. Most new highway construction was then done on the Interstate Highway System started under President Dwight D. Eisenhower, who championed its formation.

== Movies, radio and TV ==
The first decades of the twentieth century saw the rise of the film studio system. MGM, Universal and Warner Brothers all acquired land in Hollywood, which was then a small subdivision known as "Hollywoodland" on the outskirts of Los Angeles. The enormous variety in terrain and the year-round sunshine made filmmaking easier and cheaper, and actors, producers, financiers and craftsmen headed to Hollywood.

The movies made California even better known, attracting hundreds of thousands of migrants, especially from the Midwest, who loved the mild Mediterranean climate, cheap land, and new jobs.

By the 1930s, Hollywood had extended its reach into radio, and by 1950 southern California had also become a major center of television production, hosting studios for major networks such as NBC and CBS.

== California aerospace and shipping ==
=== California aerospace history ===
In 1883–1886, John J. Montgomery began experimenting with gliders. He made the first controlled flights in a heavier-than-air flying machine in America. Montgomery was killed in 1911 in a glider-related accident.

After Wilbur and Orville Wright demonstrated the feasibility of controlled manned flight, Glenn Curtiss entered the field, focusing on aircraft manufacturing and pilot training. Part of this training was done in California.

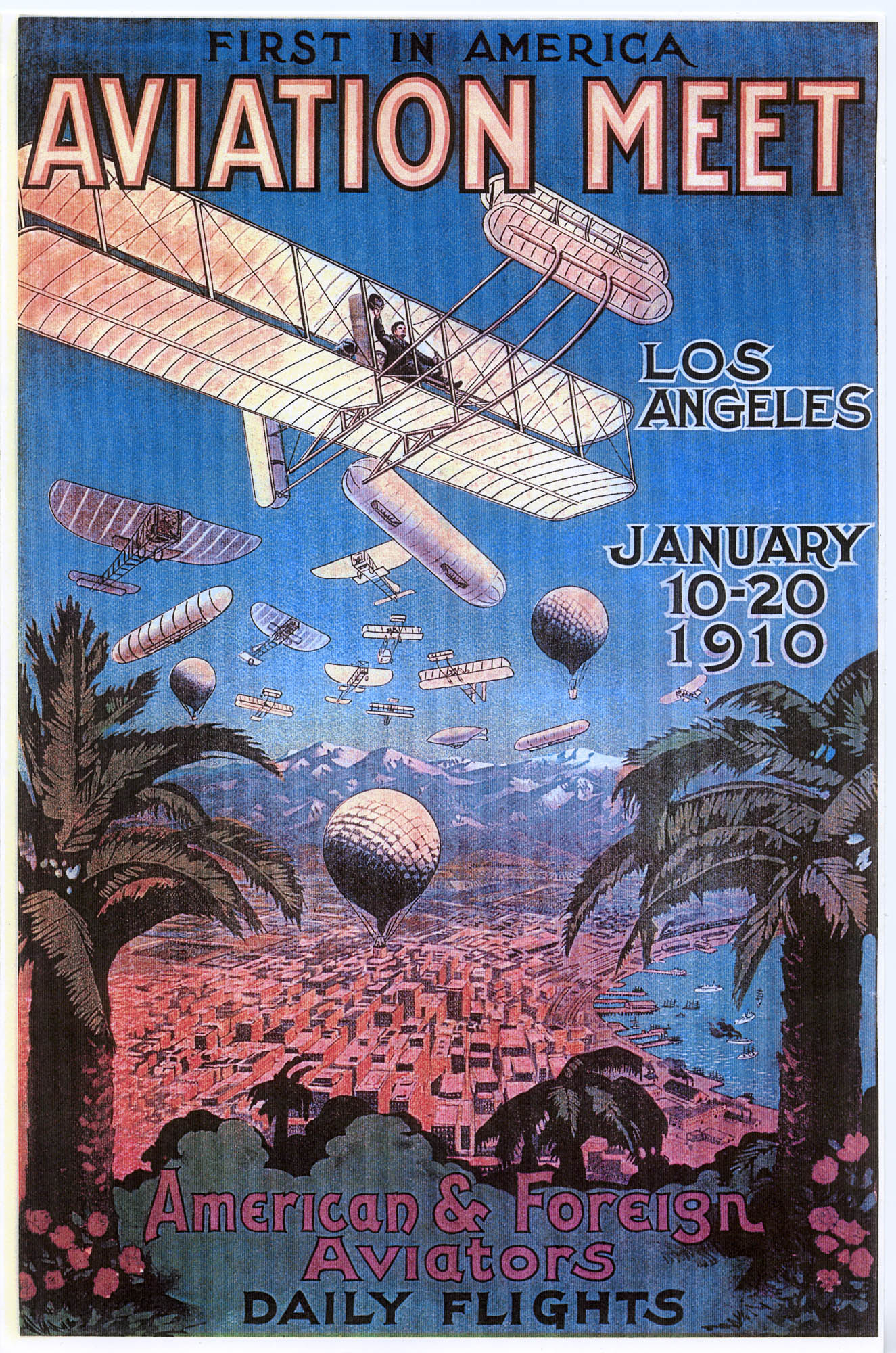
A promotional poster for the Los Angeles 1910 International Air Meet.

The Los Angeles International Air Meet (January 10 to January 20, 1910) was among the earliest air shows in the world and the first major air show in the United States. It was held in Los Angeles County at Dominguez Field in present-day Compton. Spectator turnout numbered approximately 254,000 over 11 days of ticket sales. The Los Angeles Times called it "one of the greatest public events in the history of the West."

On November 29, 1910, Glenn H. Curtiss wrote to Secretary of the Navy George von L. Meyer offering flight instruction without charge for one Navy officer as one means of assisting "in developing the adaptability of the aeroplane to military purposes." In the winter of 1910, Glenn Curtiss established a private flying school on North Island, on land obtained through the cooperation of the Aero Club of San Diego. He soon invited the Army and Navy to send officers to receive free instruction as "aeroplane pilots". On December 23, 1910, Lieut. T. Gordon "Spuds" Ellyson was ordered to report to the Glenn Curtiss Aviation Camp at North Island in San Diego. He completed his training April 12, 1911, and became Naval Aviator No. 1. The original site of this winter encampment is now part of Naval Air Station North Island in San Diego and is referred to by the Navy as "The Birthplace of Naval Aviation".

On January 18, 1911, at 11:01 a.m., Eugene Ely, flying a Curtiss pusher, landed on a specially built platform aboard the armored cruiser USS Pennsylvania at anchor in San Francisco Bay. At 11:58 a.m., he took off and returned to Selfridge Field, San Francisco.

Caltech in Pasadena provided an ideal situation for the development and manufacture of aircraft. In 1925, aircraft builder Donald Douglas and Los Angeles Times publisher Harry Chandler worked together with Caltech president Robert Millikan to bring a state-of-the-art aeronautical research laboratory to the Pasadena college. Douglas recruited some of Caltech's best and brightest students for his company. Douglas utilized the lab's wind tunnel and research staff while designing his DC-1, 2, and 3. In this way, the DC-3, undoubtedly one of the most successful aircraft designs ever built, represented more than just a single designer's project. It was a regional product, the result of an alliance of business and science created over the preceding five decades.

The Caltech Jet Propulsion Laboratory (JPL) traces its beginnings to 1936 in the Guggenheim Aeronautical Laboratory at the California Institute of Technology (GALCIT), when the first set of rocket experiments were carried out in the Arroyo Seco. Caltech graduate students Frank Malina, Weld Arnold, Apollo M. O. Smith, and Tsien Hsue-shen, along with Jack Parsons and Edward S. Forman, tested a small, alcohol-fueled motor to gather data for Malina's graduate thesis. Malina's thesis adviser was engineer-aerodynamicist Theodore von Kármán, who eventually arranged for United States Army financial support for this "GALCIT Rocket Project" in 1939. In 1941, Malina, Parsons, Forman, Martin Summerfield, and pilot Homer Bushey demonstrated the first jet-assisted takeoff rockets (JATO units) to the Army. In 1943, von Kármán, Malina, Parsons, and Forman established the Aerojet Corporation to manufacture JATO motors. The project took on the name Jet Propulsion Laboratory in November 1943, formally becoming an Army facility operated under contract by the university.

During JPL's Army years, the laboratory developed two deployed weapon systems, the MGM-5 Corporal and MGM-29 Sergeant intermediate range ballistic missiles, the first US ballistic missiles developed at JPL. It also developed a number of other weapons system prototypes, such as the Loki anti-aircraft missile system, and the forerunner of the Aerobee sounding rocket. At various times, it carried out rocket testing at the White Sands Proving Ground, Edwards Air Force Base, and Goldstone, California. A lunar lander was also developed in 1938–39 which influenced design of the Apollo Lunar Module in the 1960s.

In 1954, JPL teamed up with Wernher von Braun's rocketeers at the Army Ballistic Missile Agency's Redstone Arsenal in Huntsville, Alabama, to propose orbiting a satellite during the International Geophysical Year. The team lost that proposal to Project Vanguard, and instead embarked on a classified project to demonstrate ablative re-entry technology using a Jupiter-C rocket. They carried out three successful sub-orbital flights in 1956 and 1957. Using a spare Jupiter-C, the two organizations then launched America's first satellite, Explorer 1, on February 1, 1958.

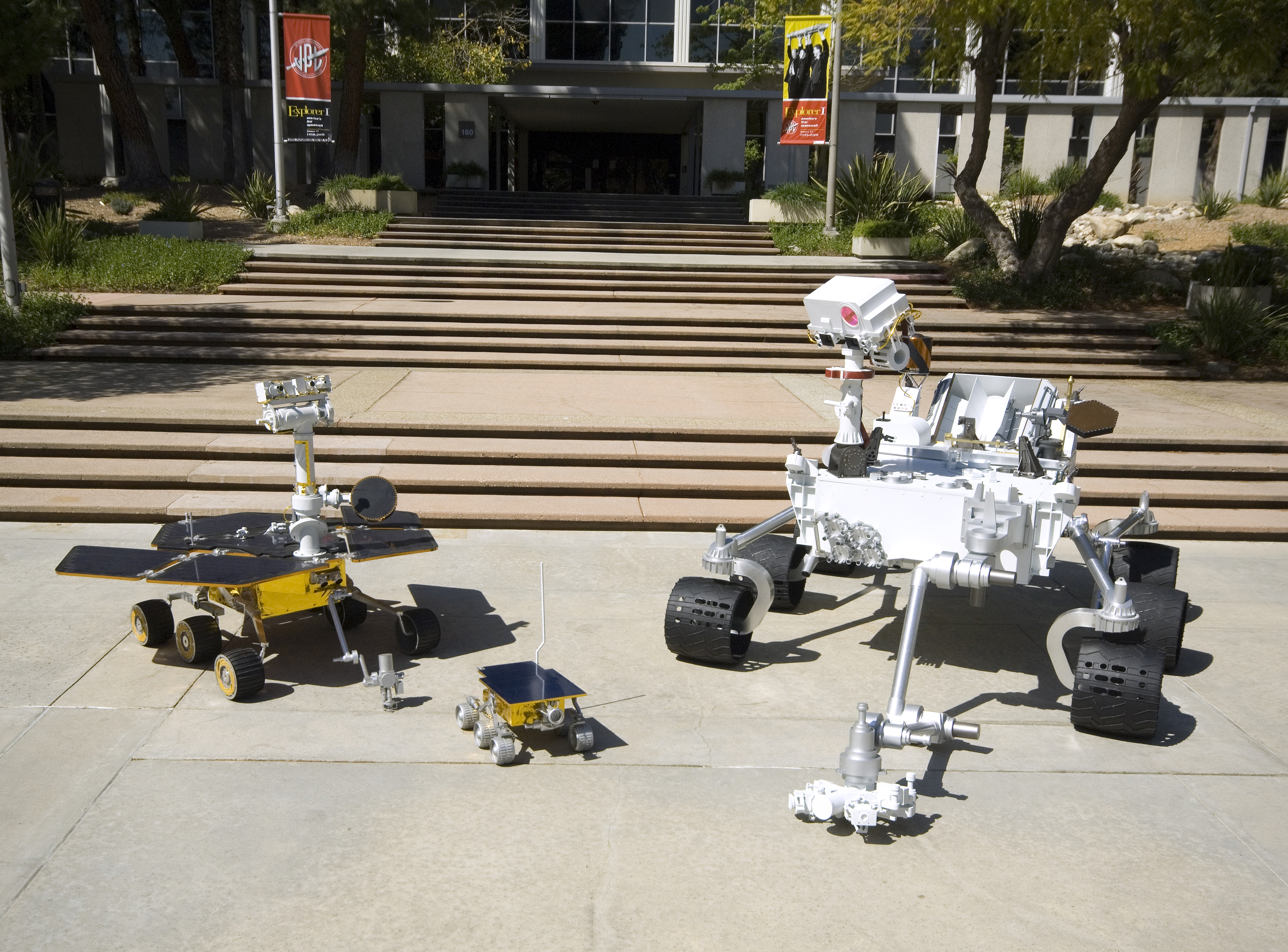
MSL mockup compared with the Mars Exploration Rover and Sojourner rover by the Jet Propulsion Laboratory on May 12, 2008.

JPL was transferred to NASA in December 1958, becoming the agency's primary planetary spacecraft center. JPL engineers designed and operated Ranger and Surveyor missions to the Moon that prepared the way for the Apollo program. JPL also led the way in interplanetary exploration with the Mariner missions to Venus, Mars, and Mercury. In 1998, JPL opened the Near-Earth Object Program Office for NASA; as of 2013, it has found 95% of asteroids that are a kilometer or more in diameter that cross Earth's orbit.

In 1940, 65% of aircraft manufacturers were located along or near the East or West Coasts of the United States. California alone had 44 percent of all aircraft manufacturing. In 1944, 12 states shared 85 percent of airframe floor space, and California's percentage had dropped to 24%. Engine and propeller manufacturing had also decentralized. Most wartime expansion took place inland due to concerns over possible coastal attacks. After the war, massive layoffs occurred as wartime orders were cancelled.

Major manufacturers of aircraft in California were/are Douglas Aircraft Company, Lockheed Corporation, Boeing, Hughes Aircraft, Glenn L. Martin Company, North American Aviation, Northrop Corporation, Vultee, and many others. Many of these early companies would disappear or consolidate with other companies. However, a few would grow to become giants in the industry.

=== Notable California aircraft ===
Gallery of aircraft and spacecraft built and developed (wholly or in part) in California. Many more could be included.

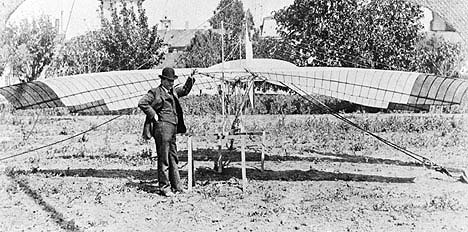
Montgomery's The Santa Clara glider 1905

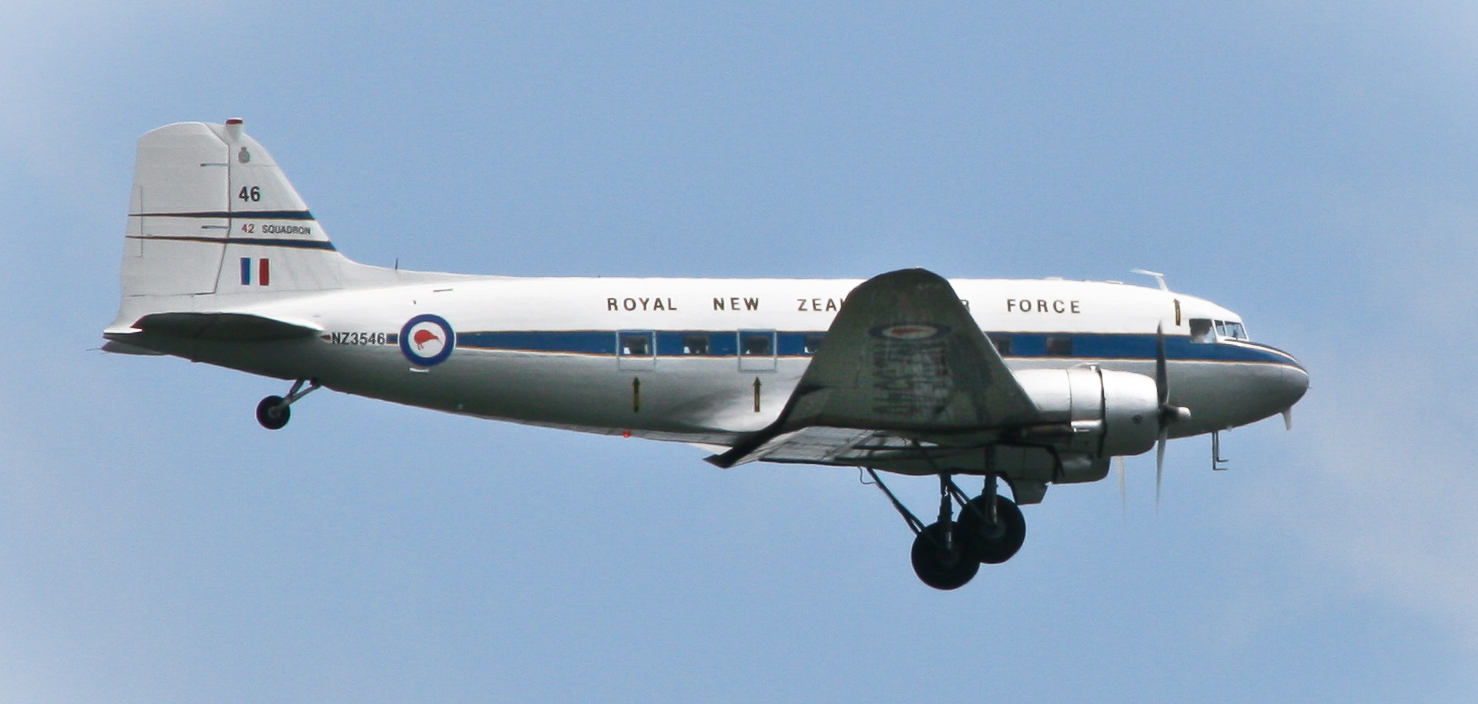
Douglas DC-3 1936

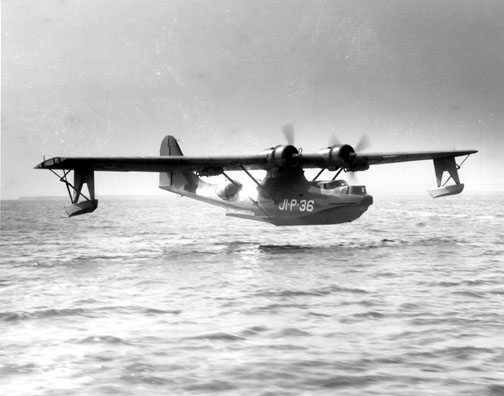
Consolidated PBY Catalina 1936

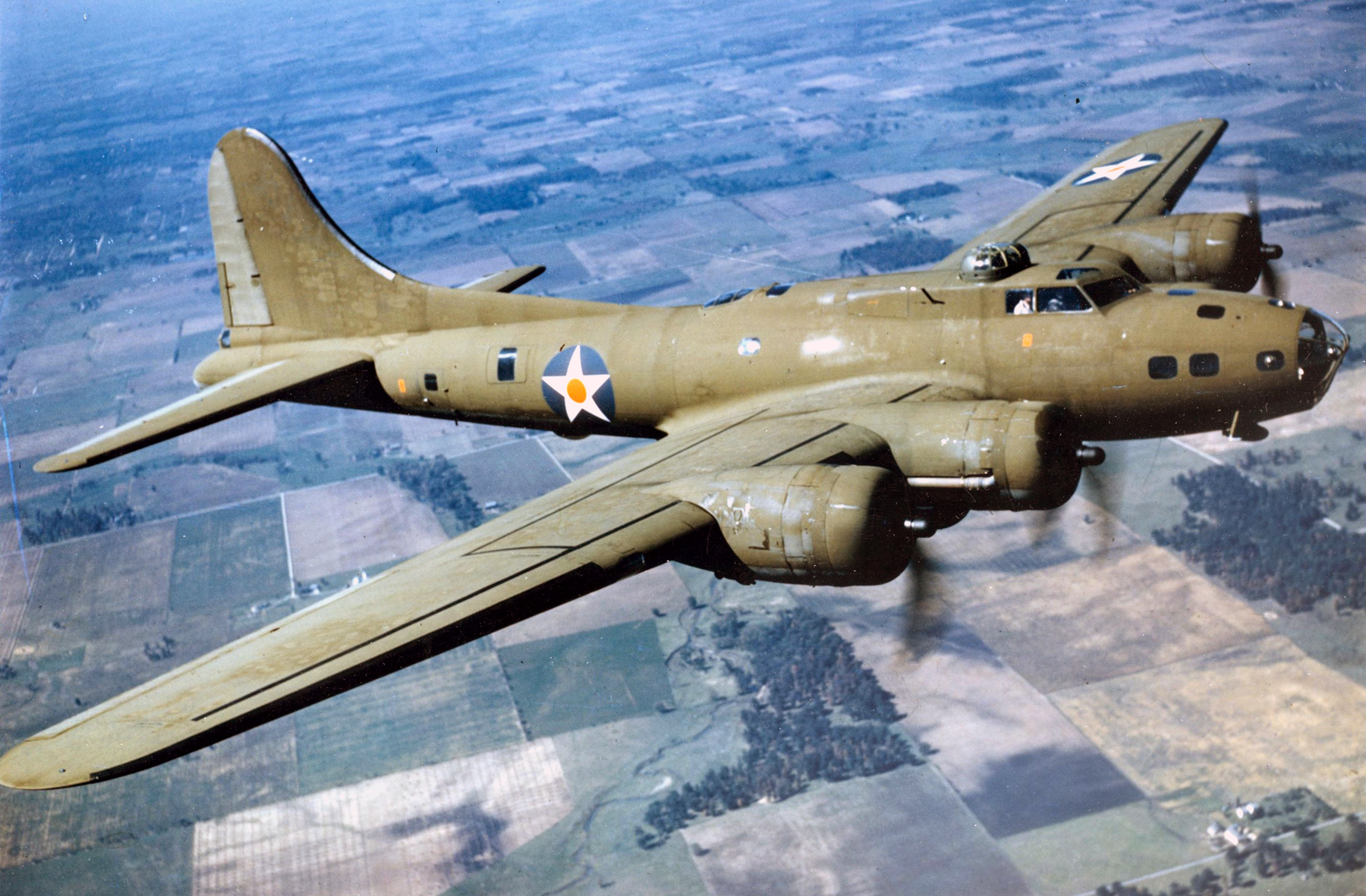
Boeing B-17 Flying Fortress 1936

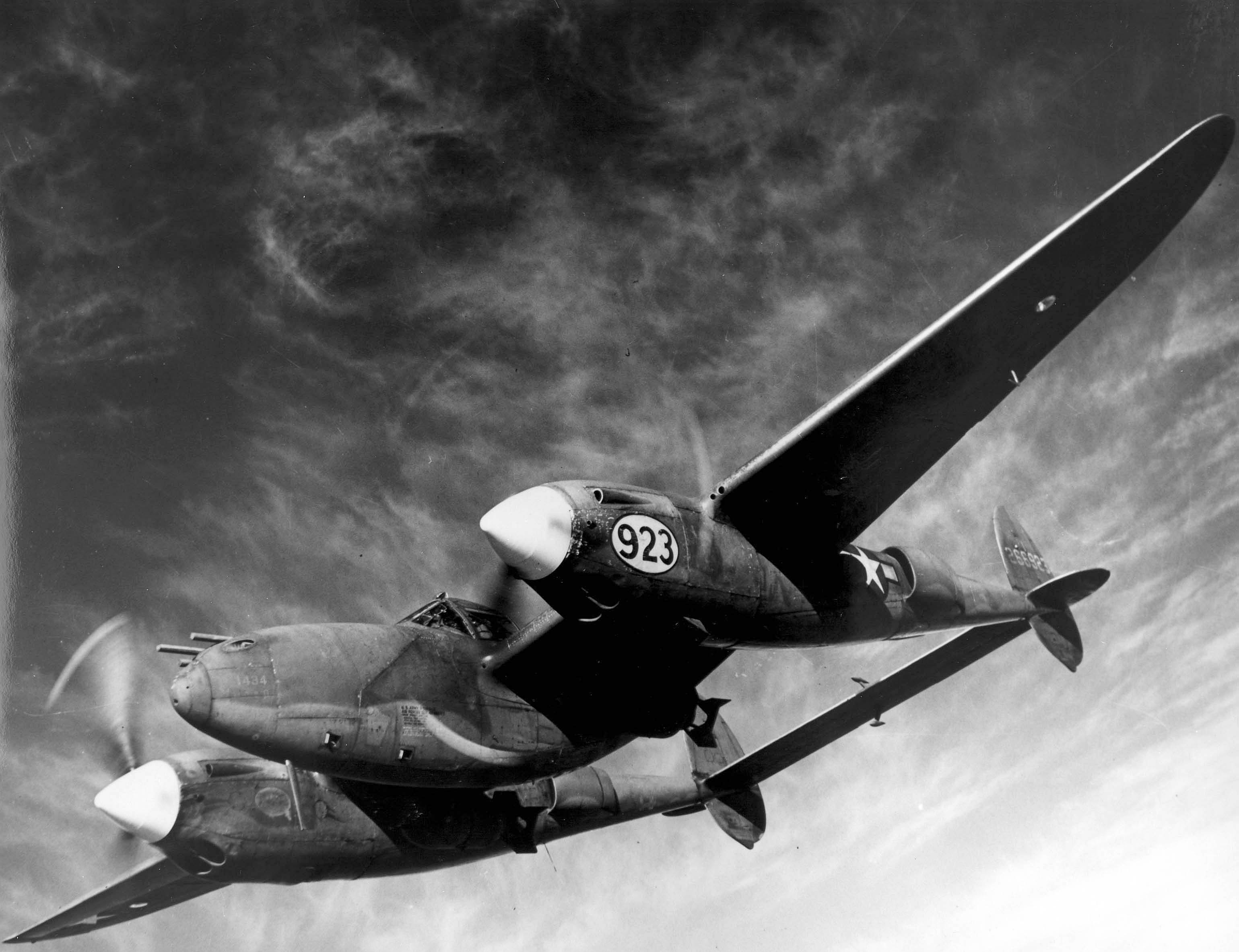
Lockheed P-38 Lightning 1940

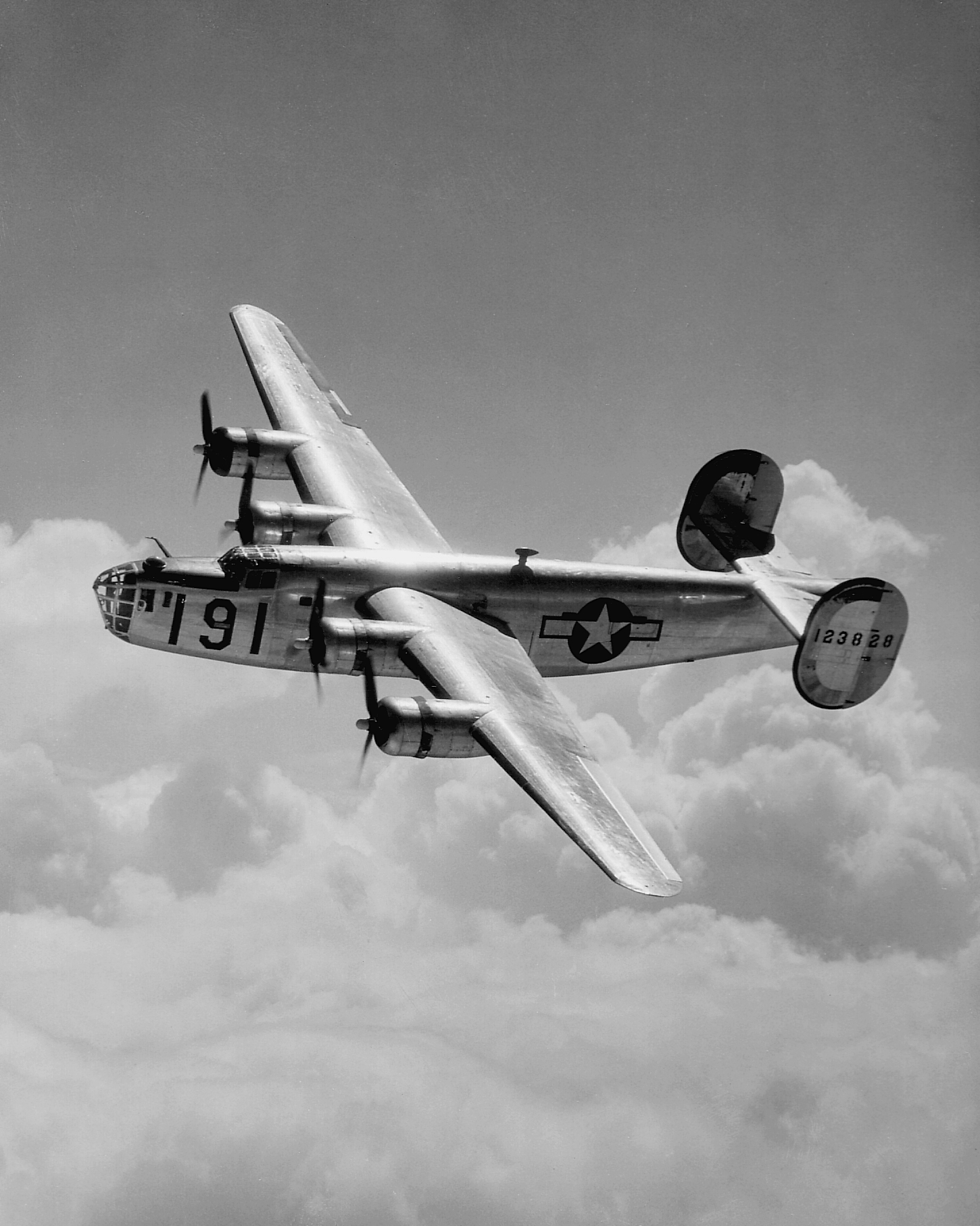
Consolidated B-24 Liberator 1940

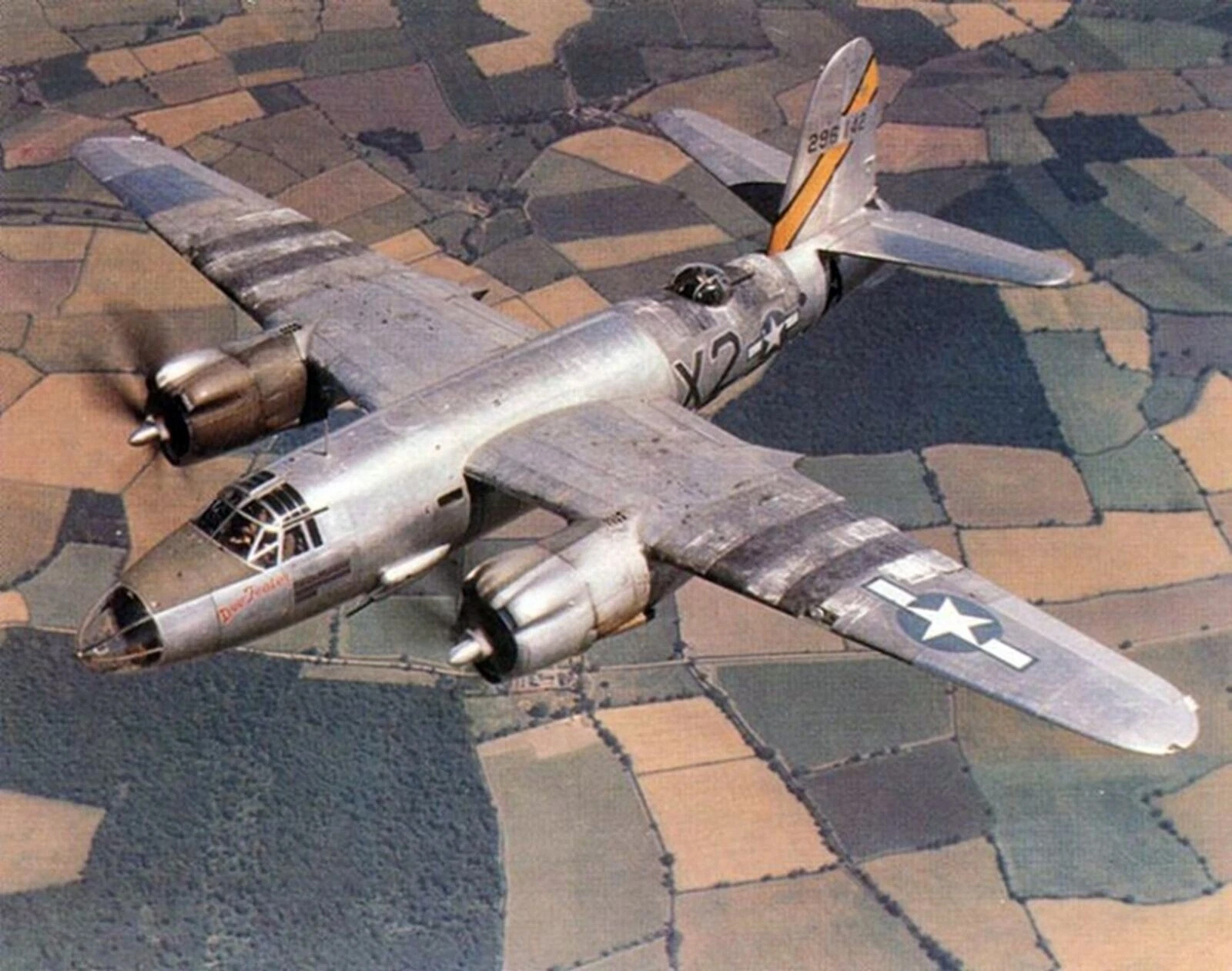
Martin B-26 Marauder 1940

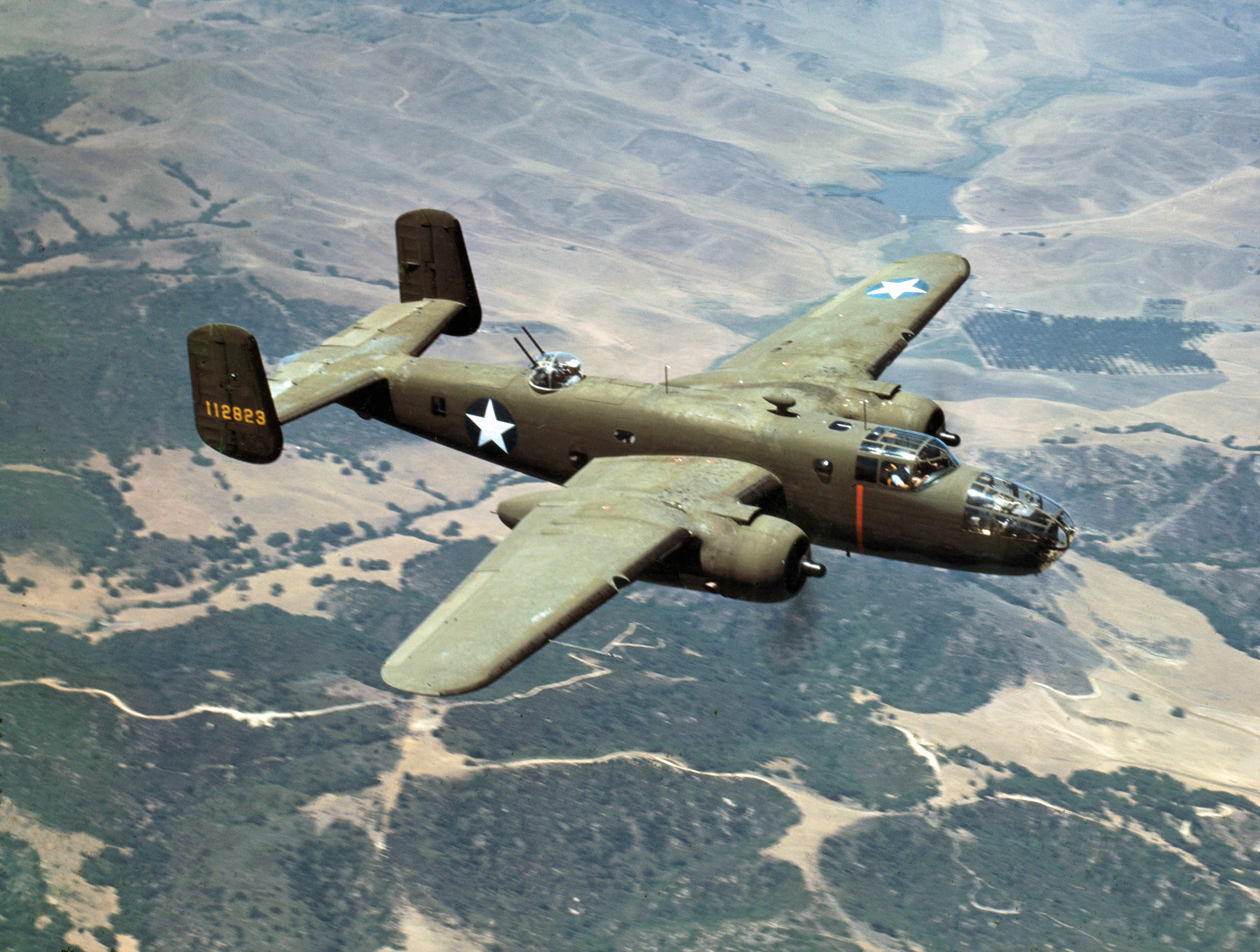
North American B-25 Mitchell1940

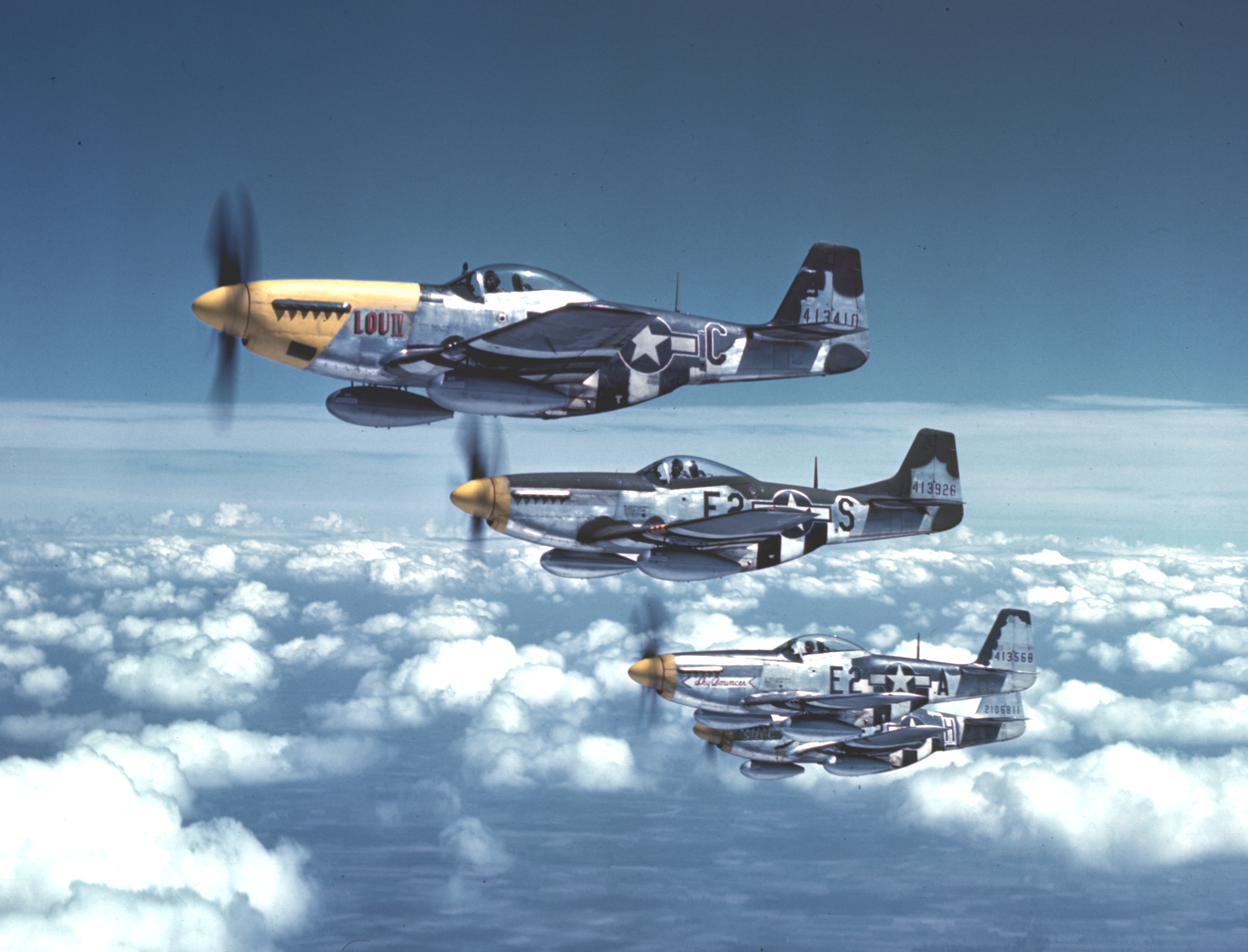
North American P-51 Mustang 1944

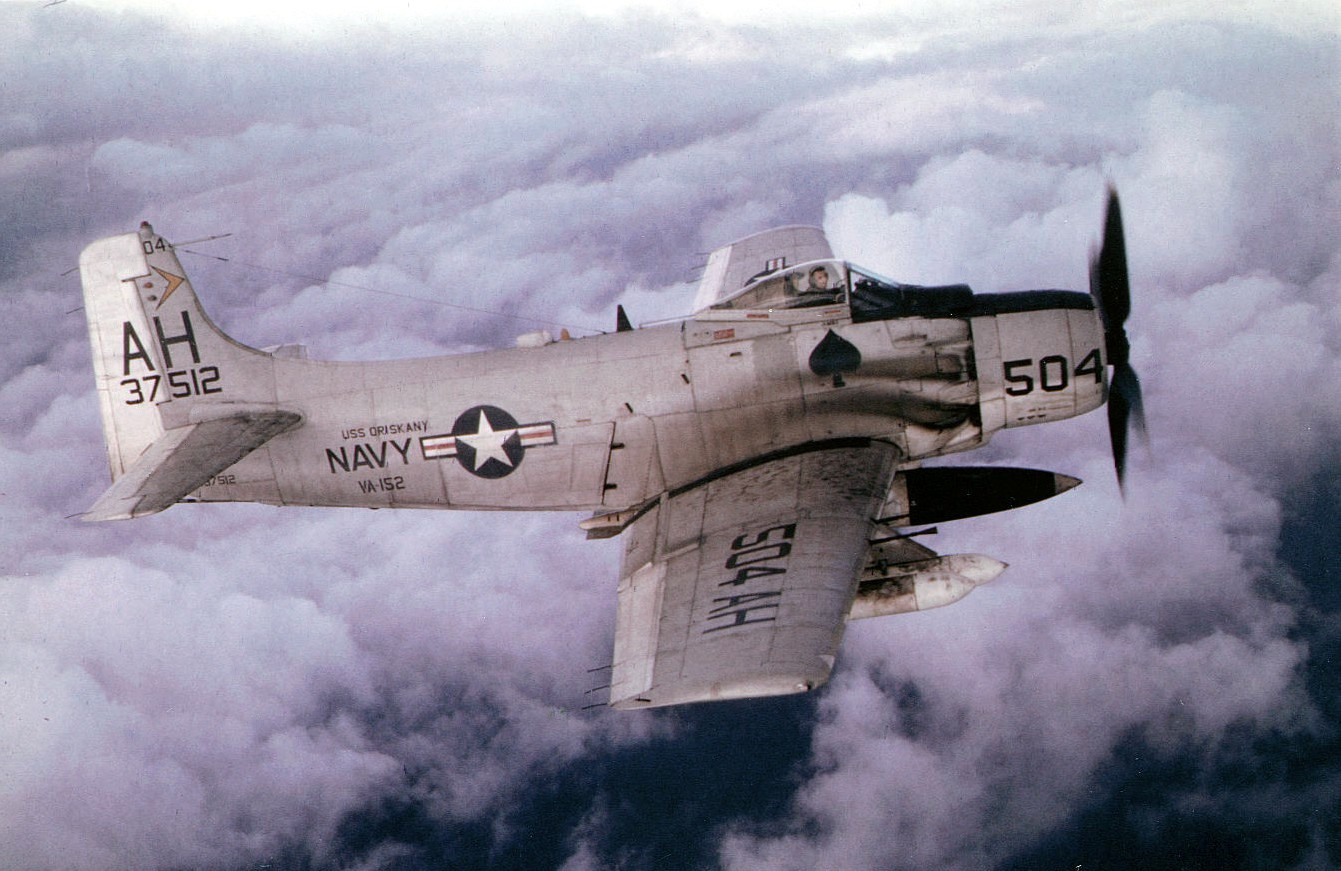
Douglas A-1 Skyraider 1945

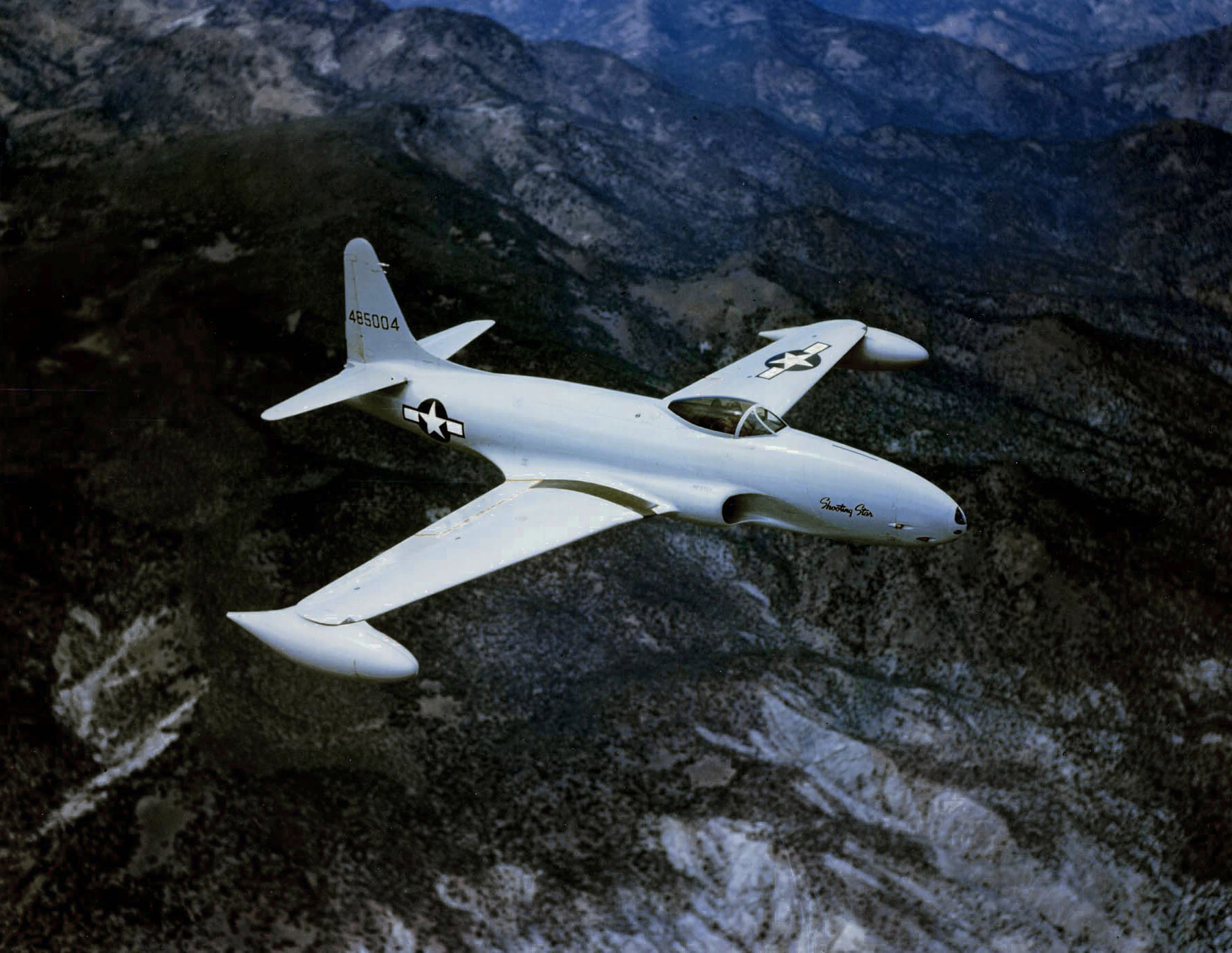
Lockheed P-80 Shooting Star 1945

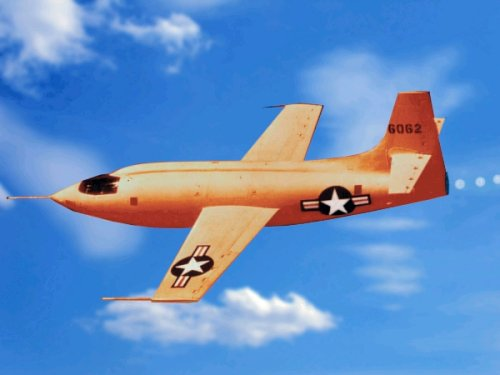
Bell X-1 1946

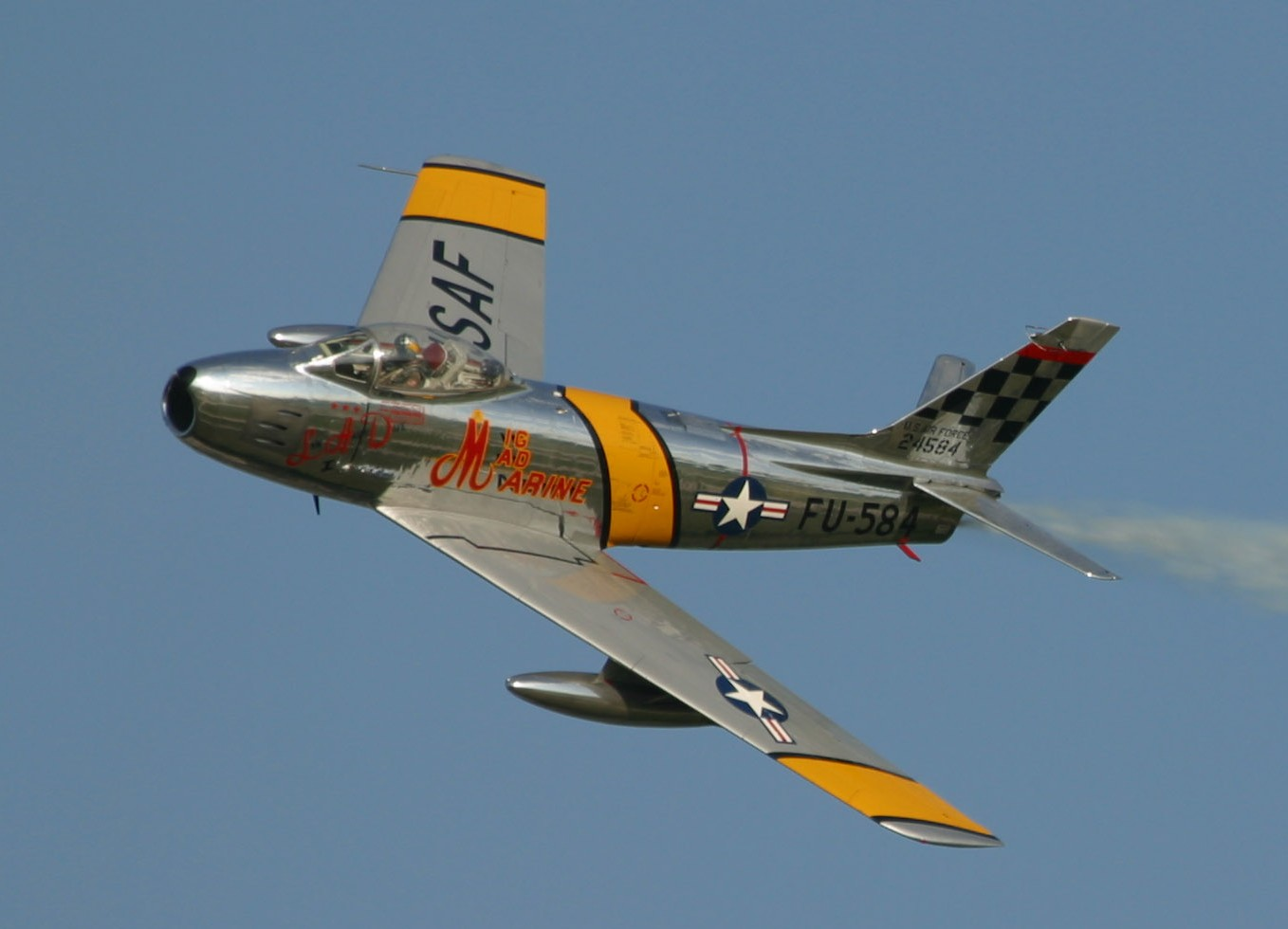
North American F-86 Sabre 1947

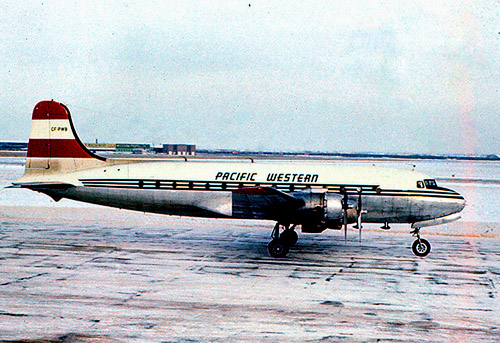
Douglas DC-4 1947

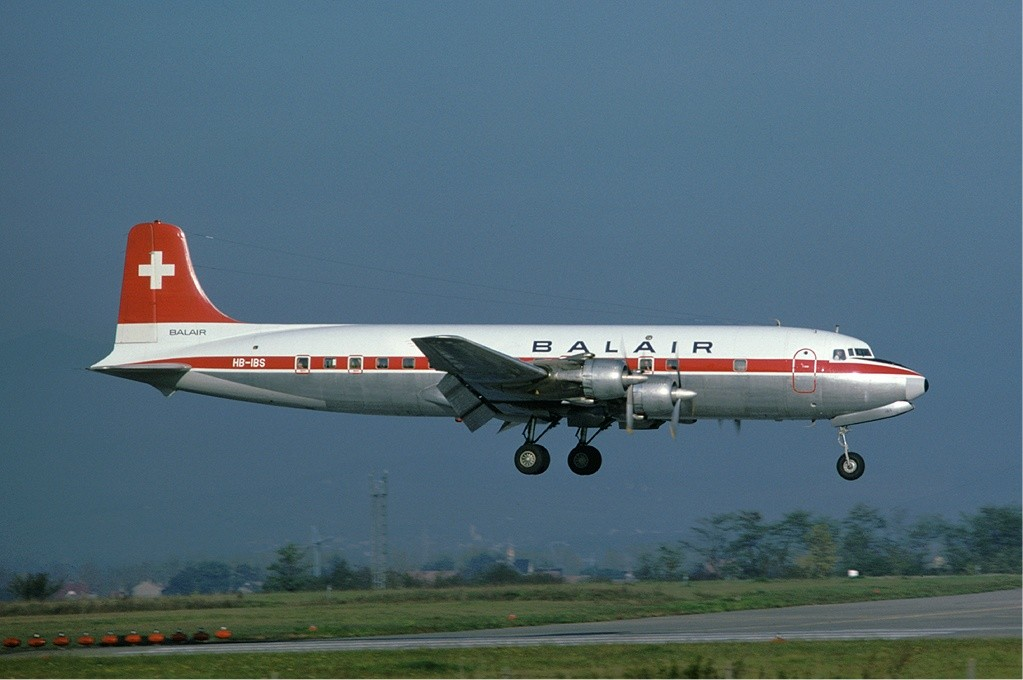
Douglas DC-6 1947

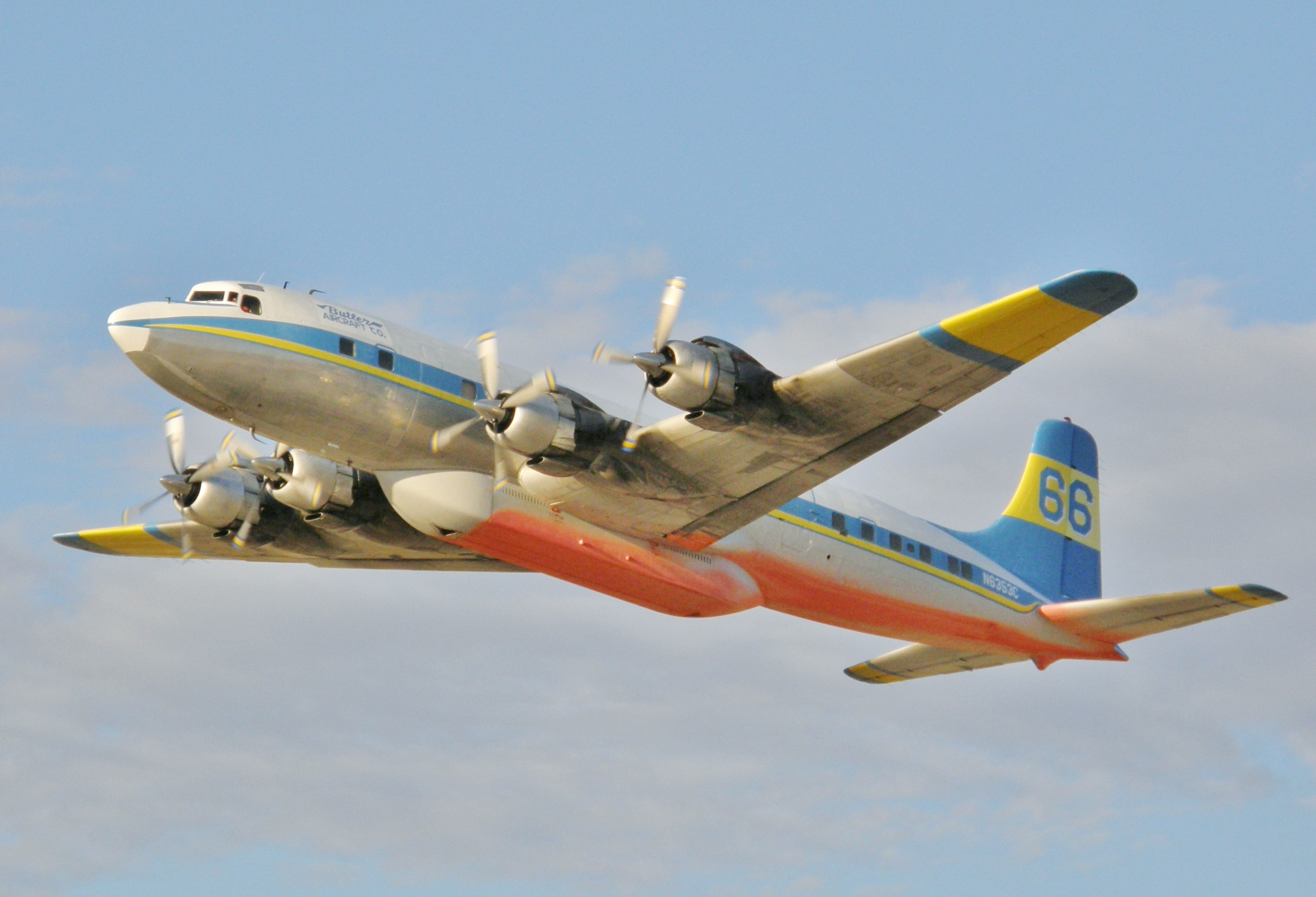
Douglas DC-7 1953

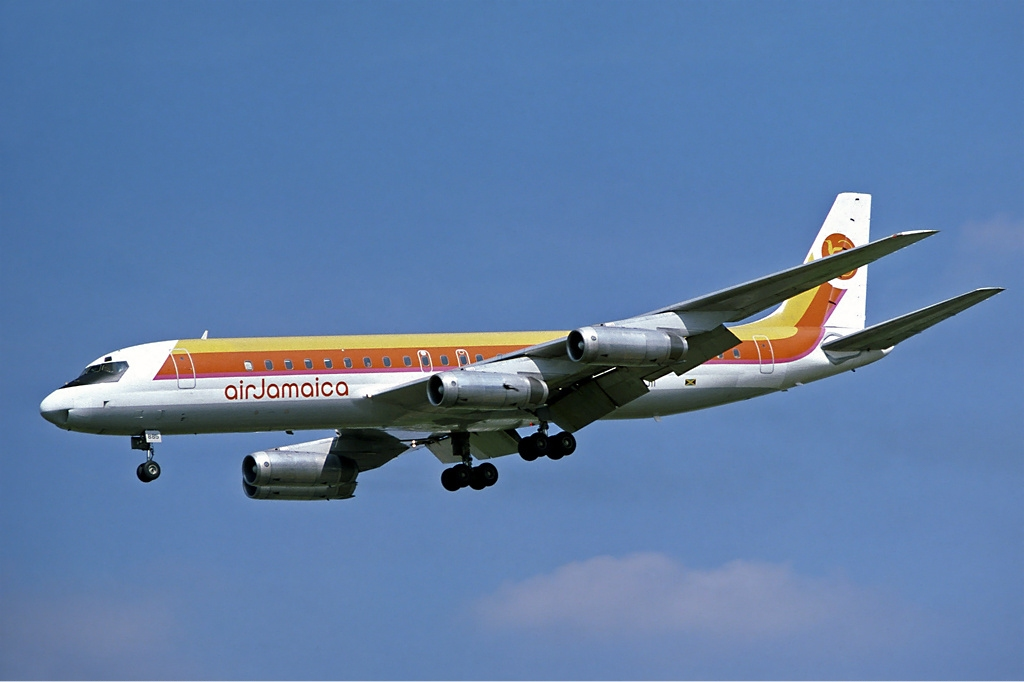
Douglas DC-8 1958

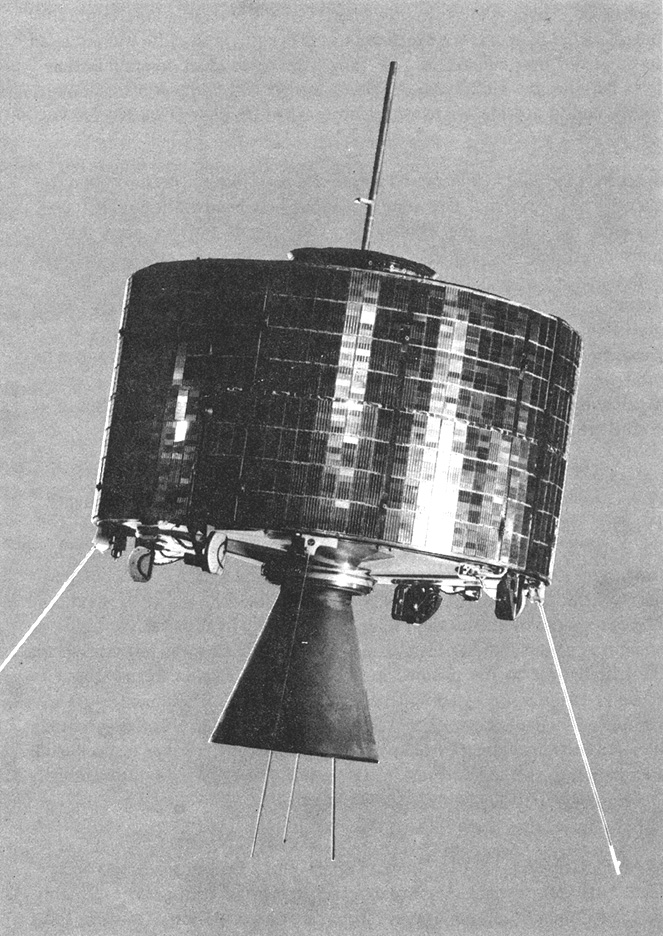
Syncom communications satellite 1963

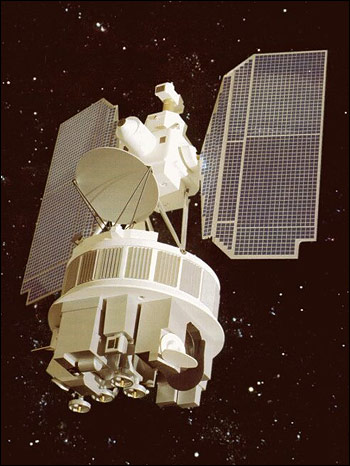
Nimbus program weather satellite 1964

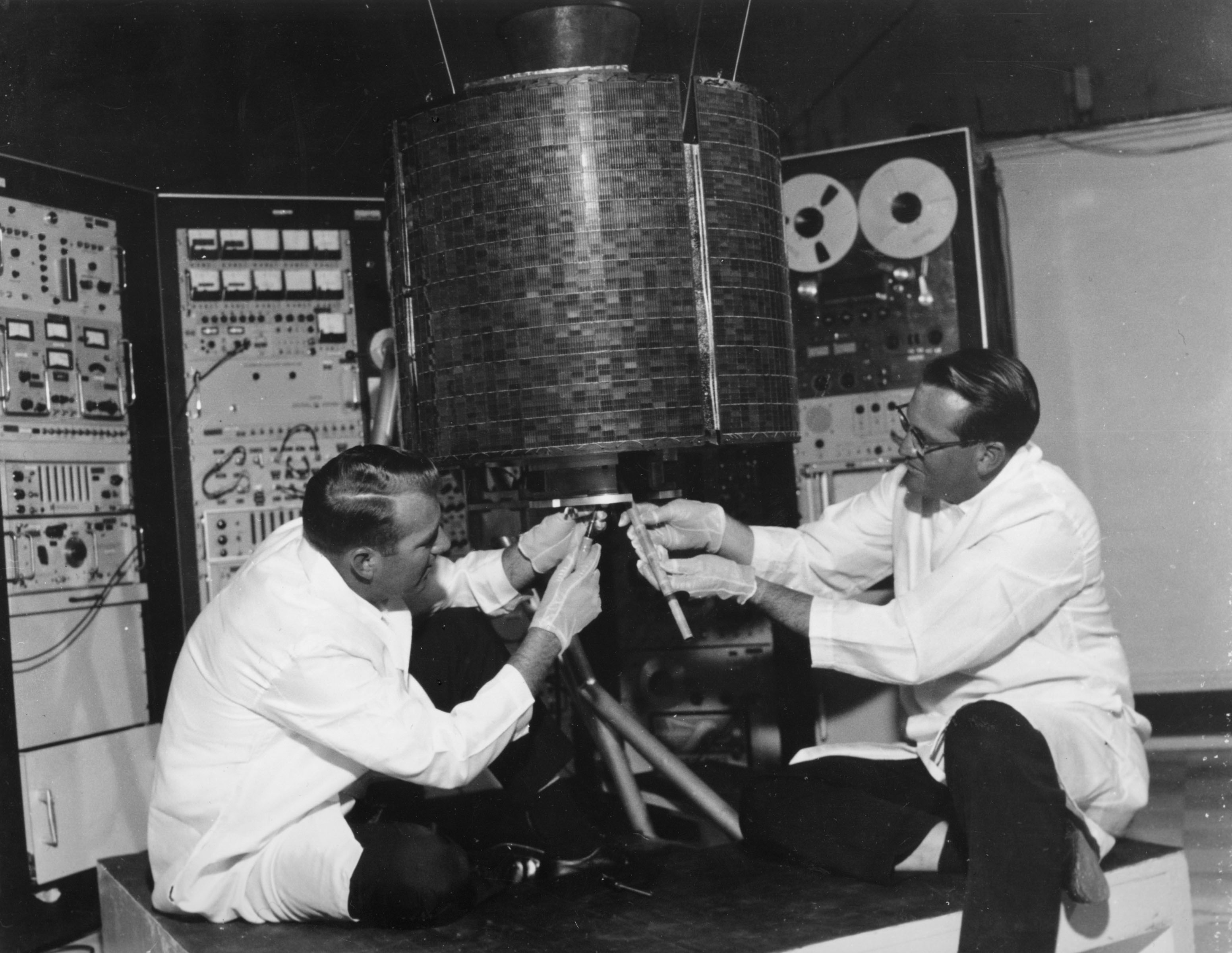
Intelsat I 1965

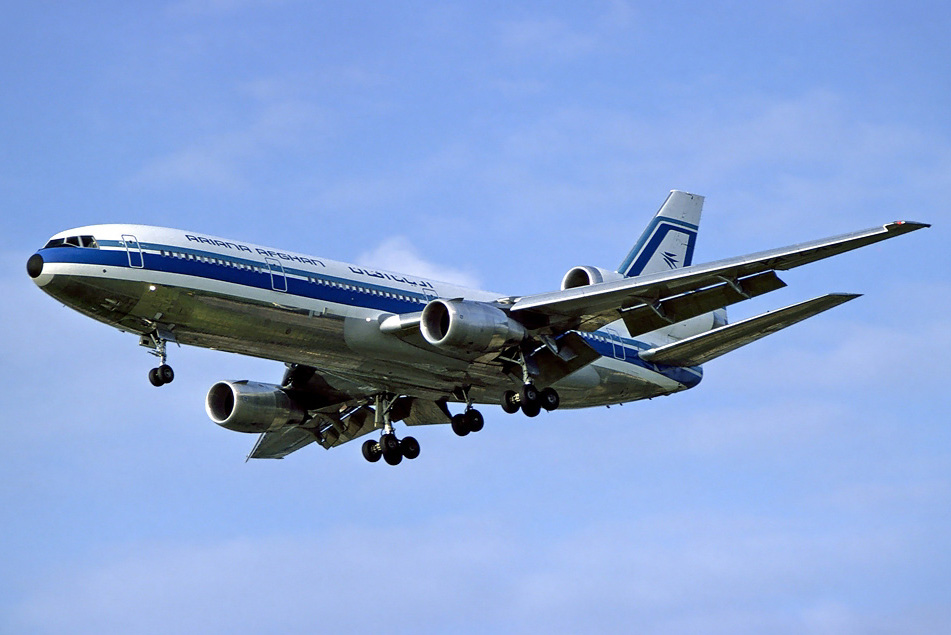
McDonnell Douglas DC-10 1970

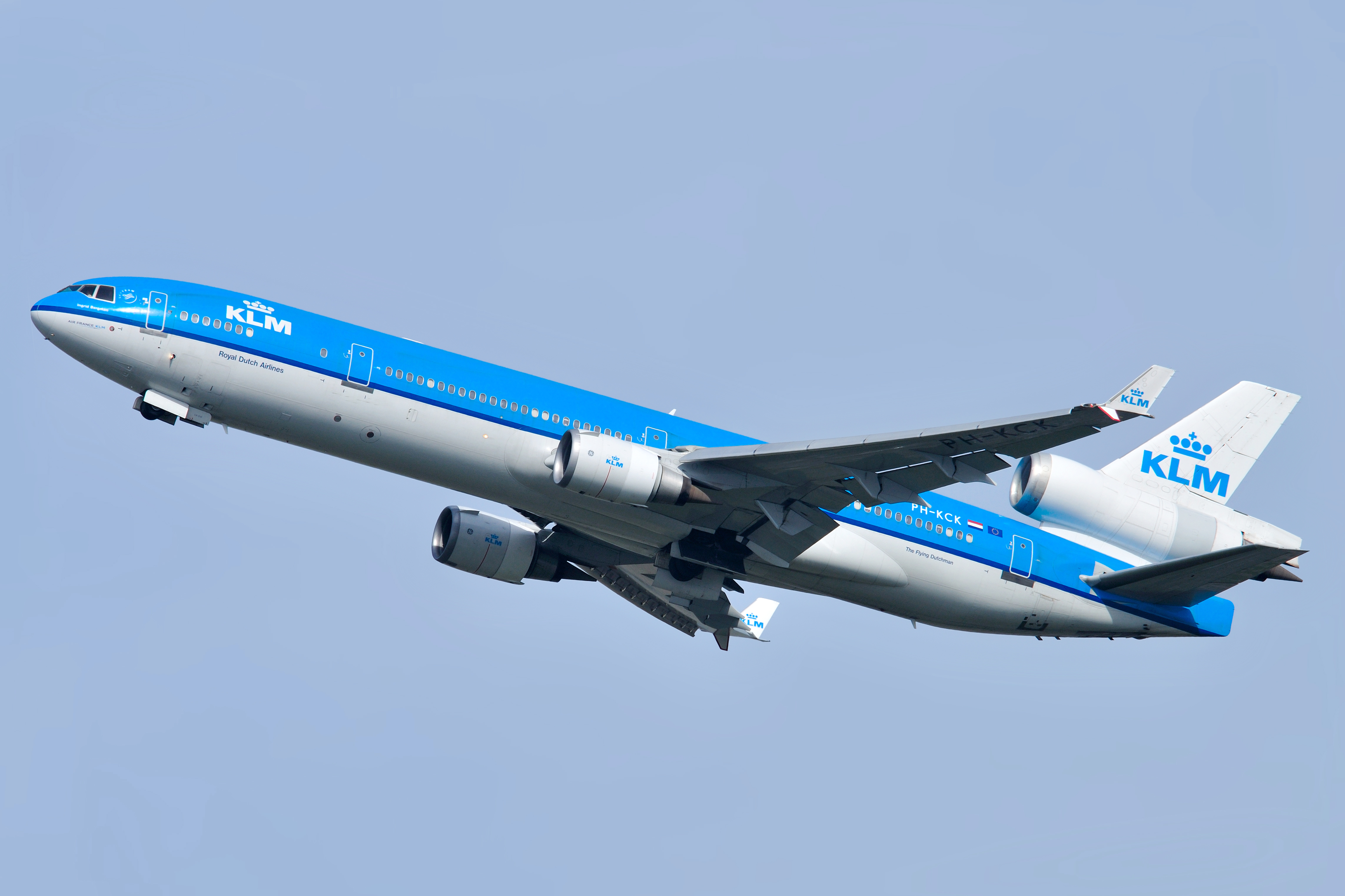
McDonnell Douglas MD-11 1990

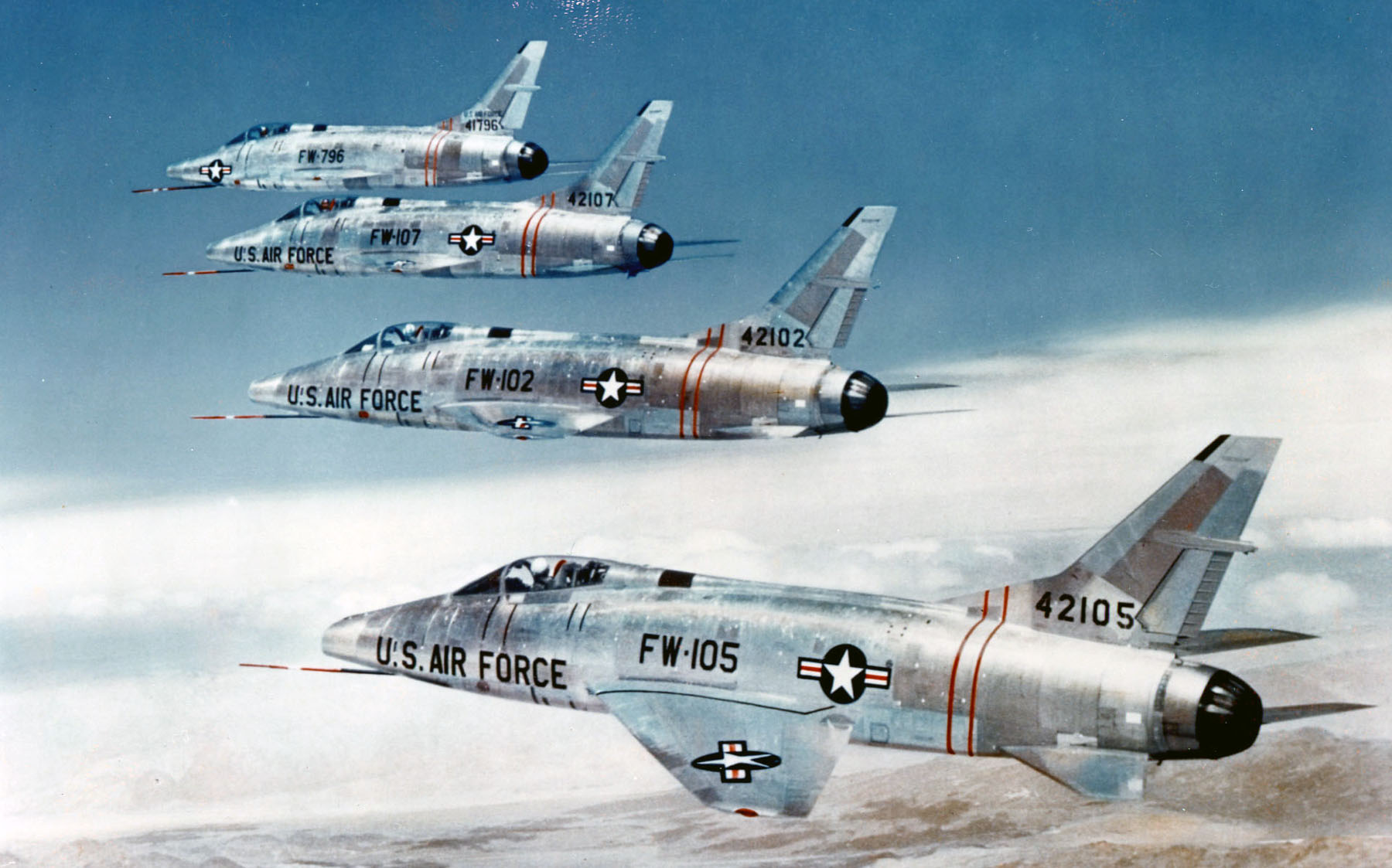
North American F-100 Super Sabre 1954

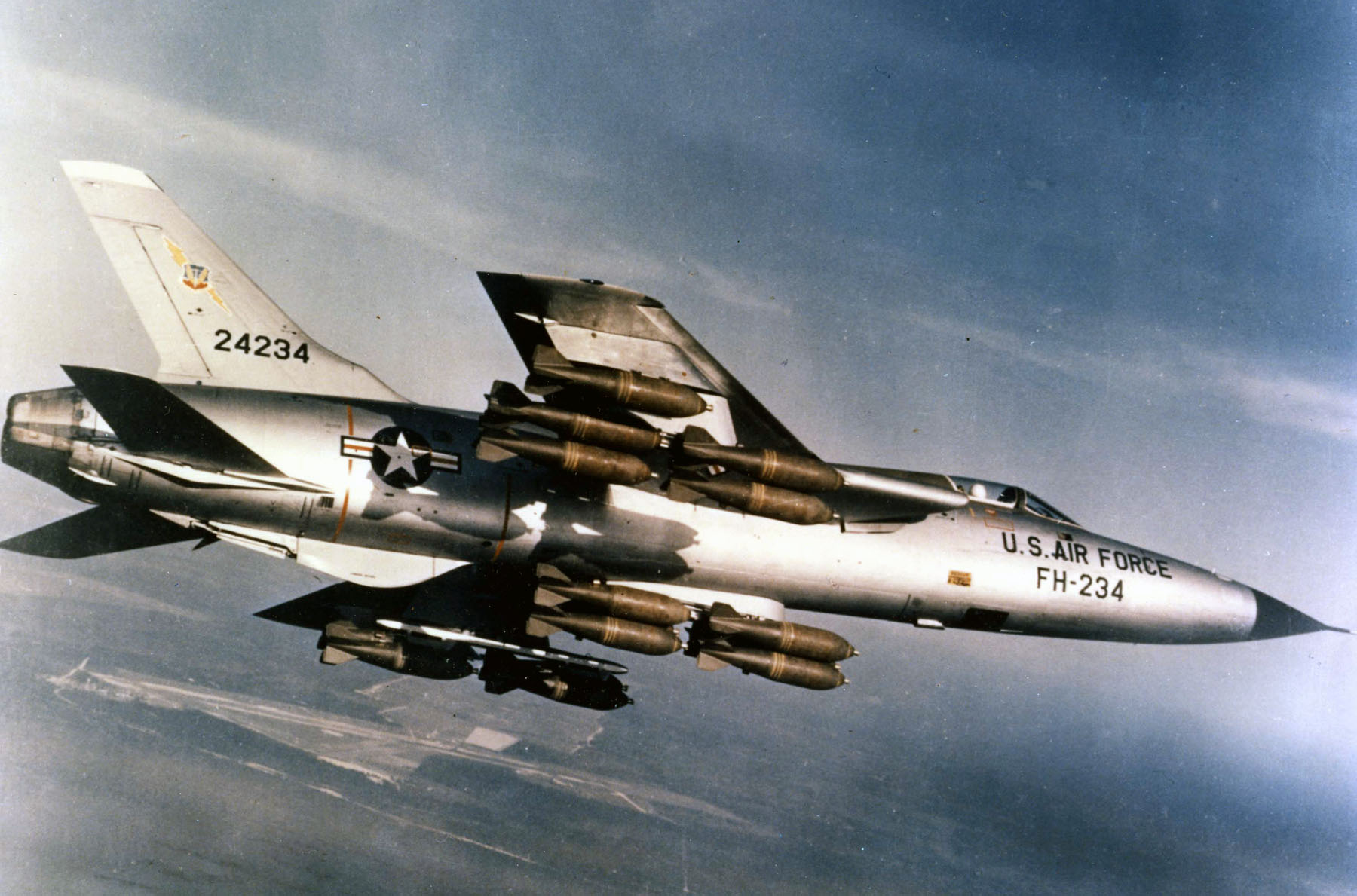
Republic F-105 Thunderchief 1955

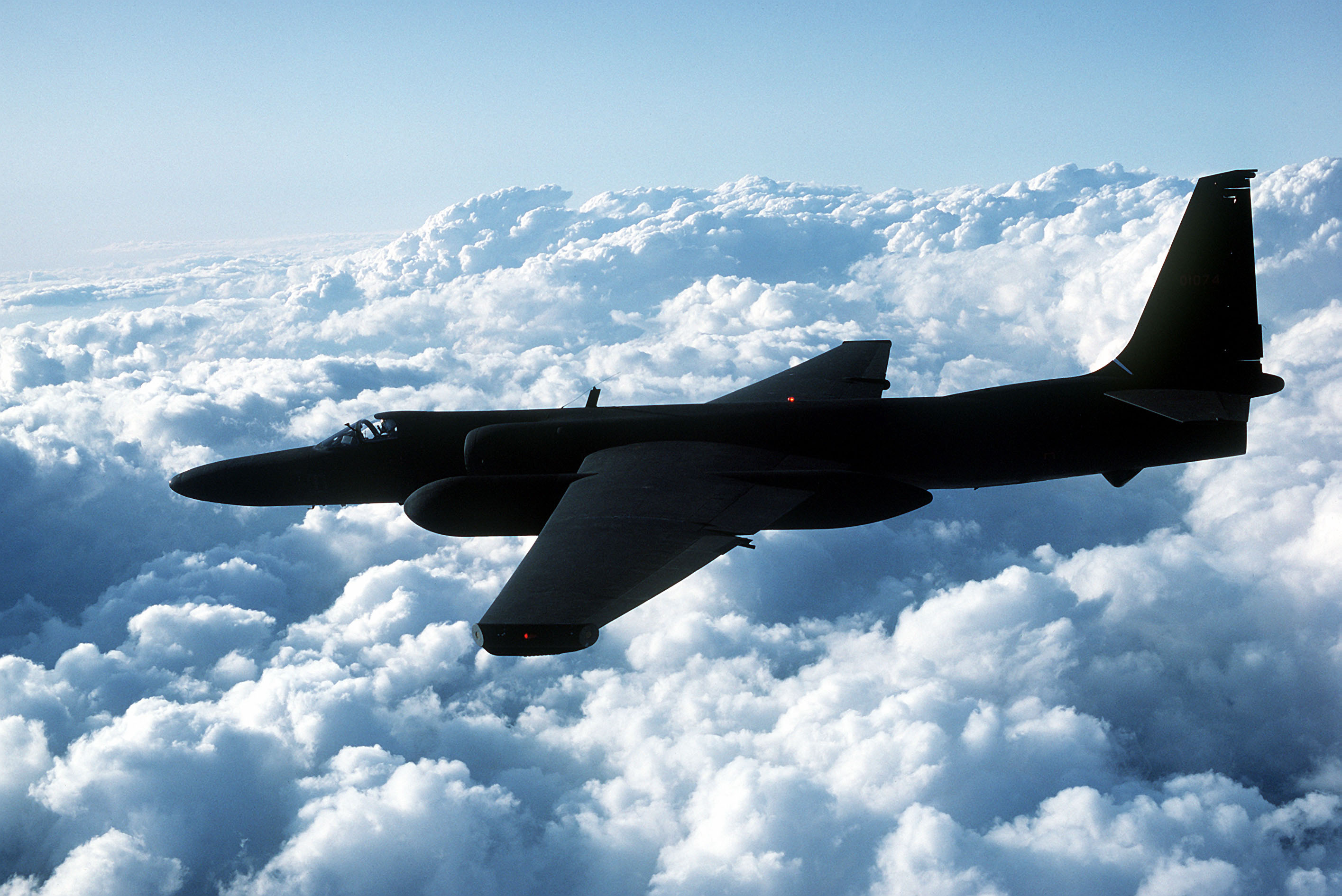
Lockheed U-2 1957

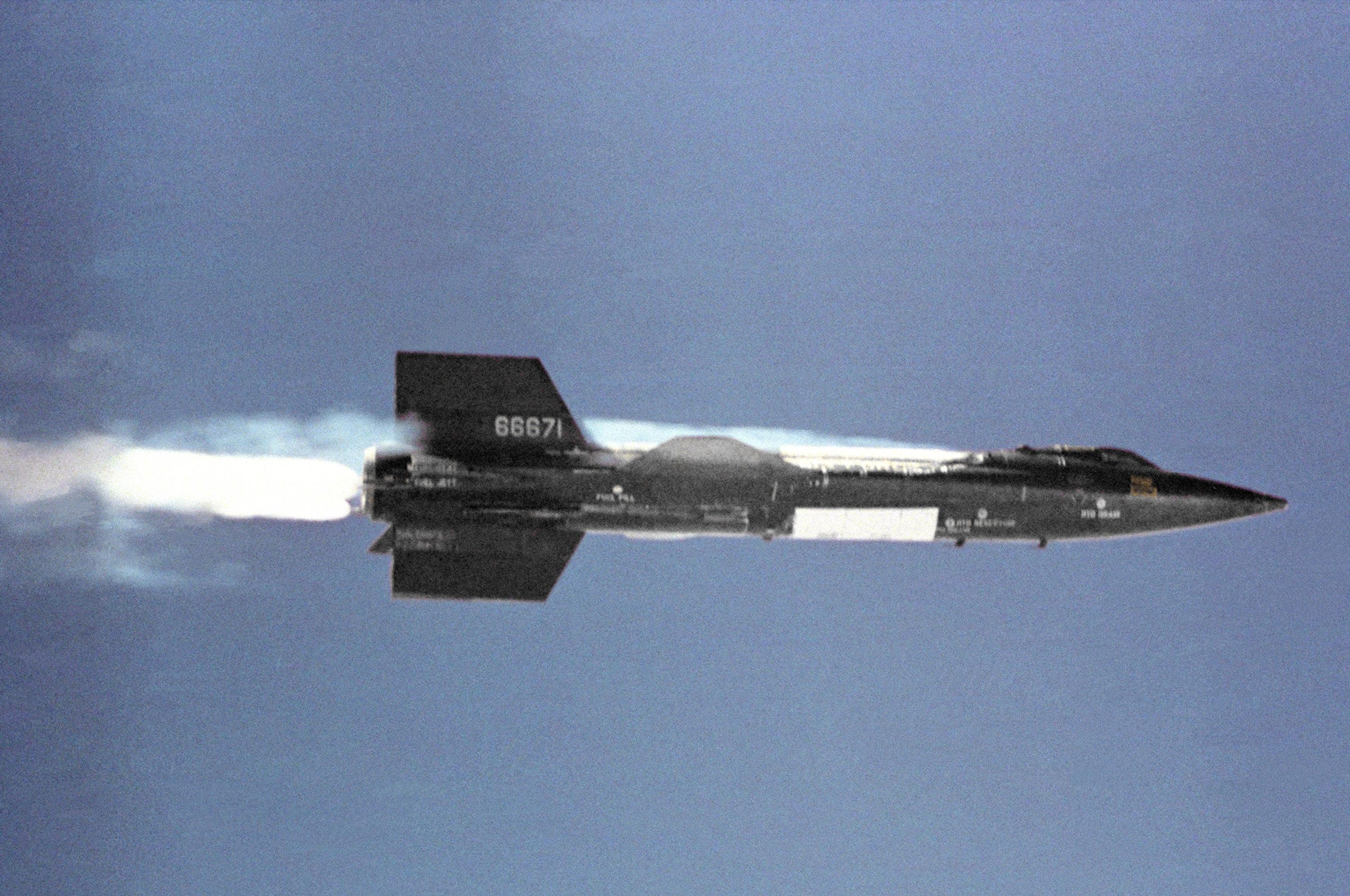
North American X-15 1959

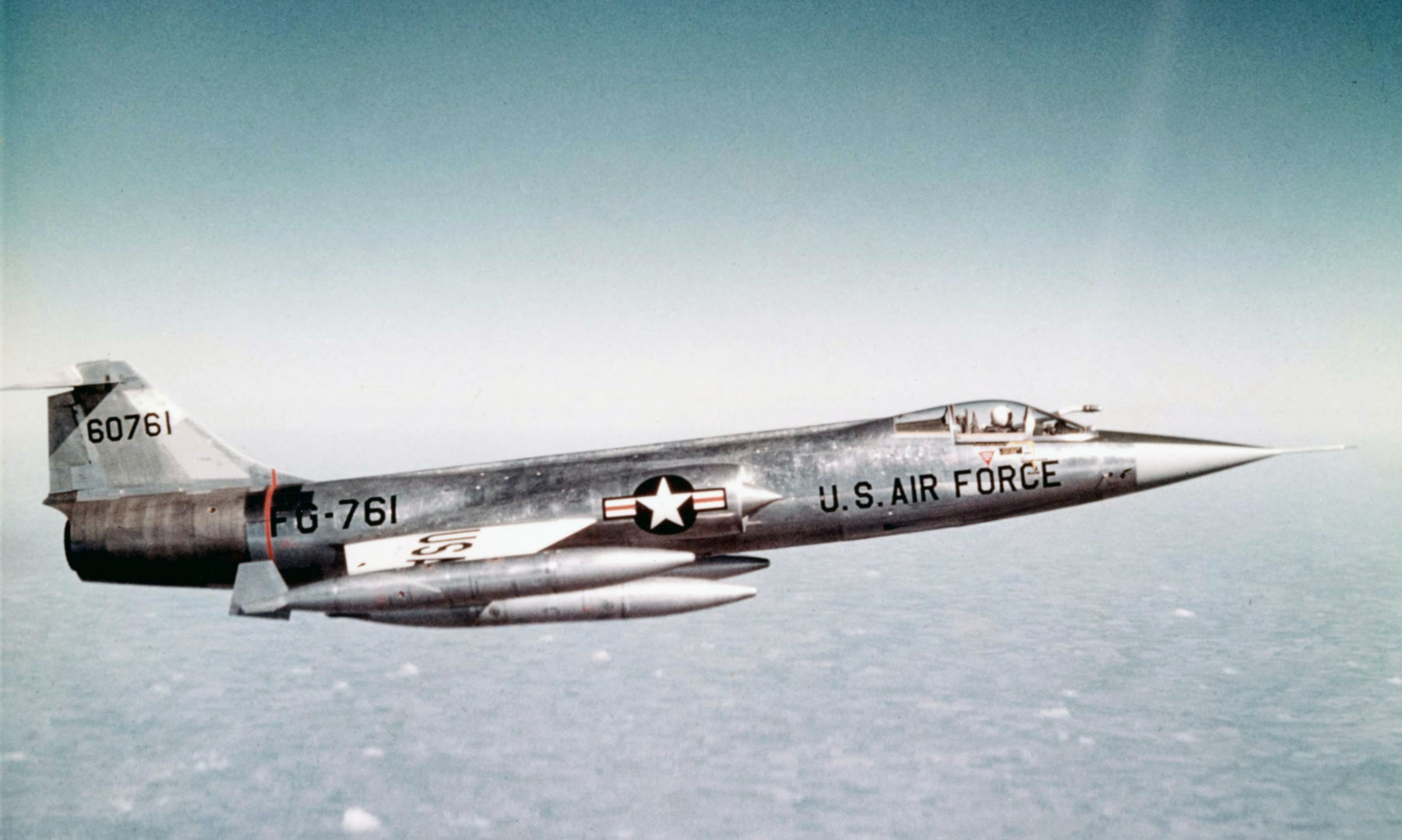
Lockheed F-104 Starfighter 1959

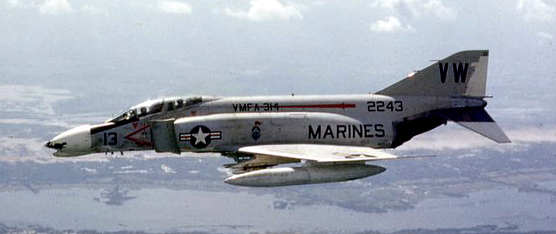
McDonnell Douglas F-4 Phantom II 1960

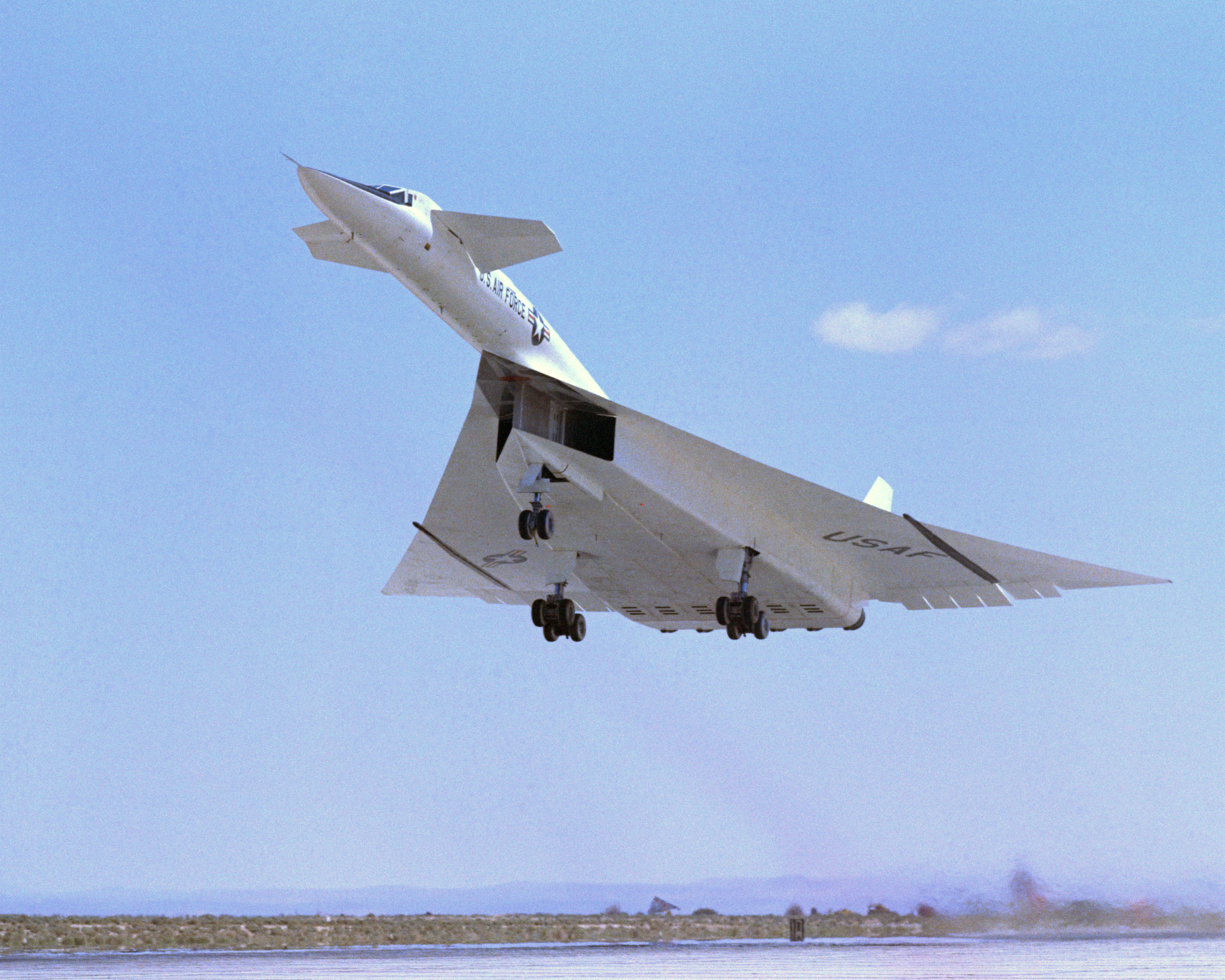
North American XB-70 Valkyrie 1964

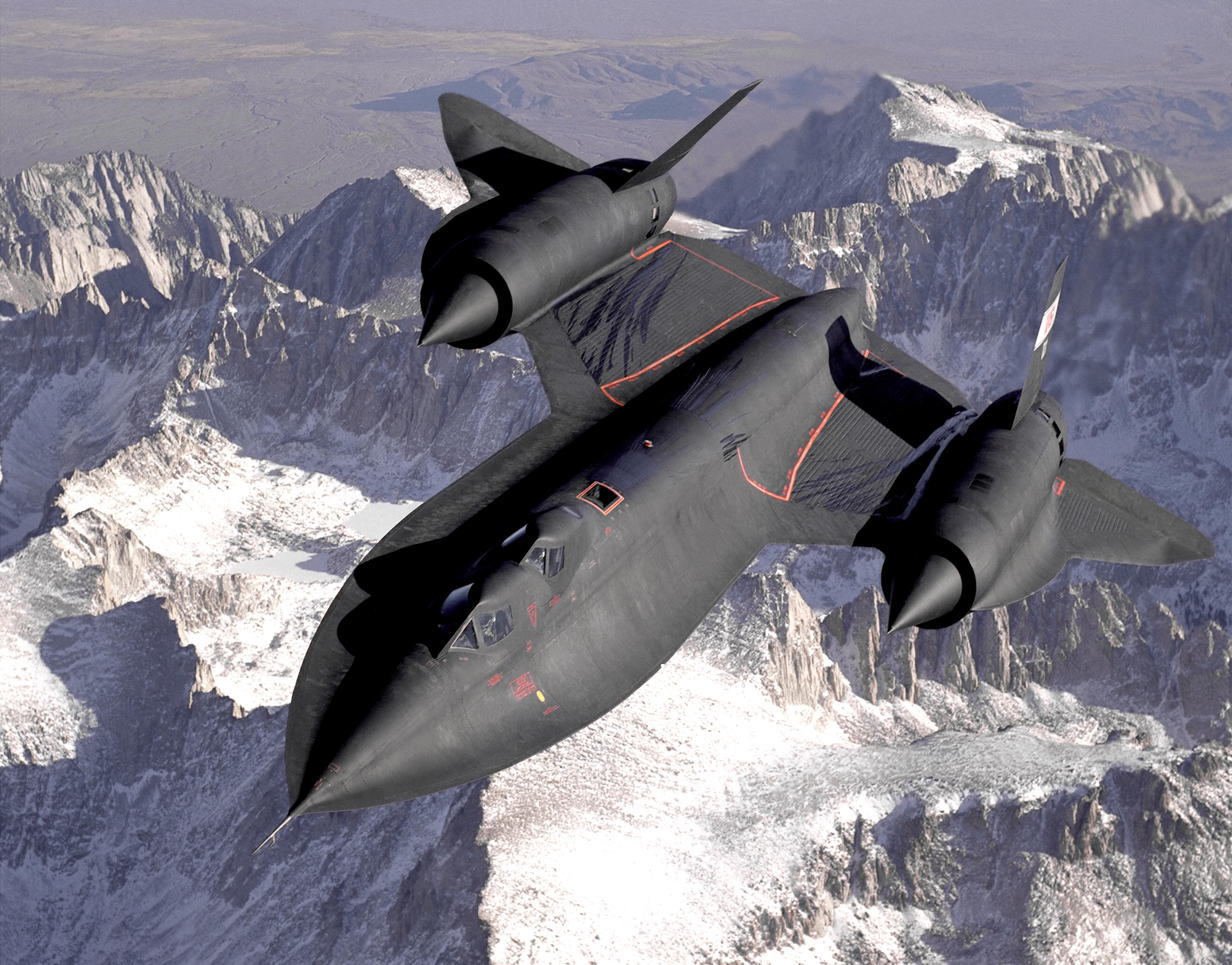
Lockheed SR-71 Blackbird 1966

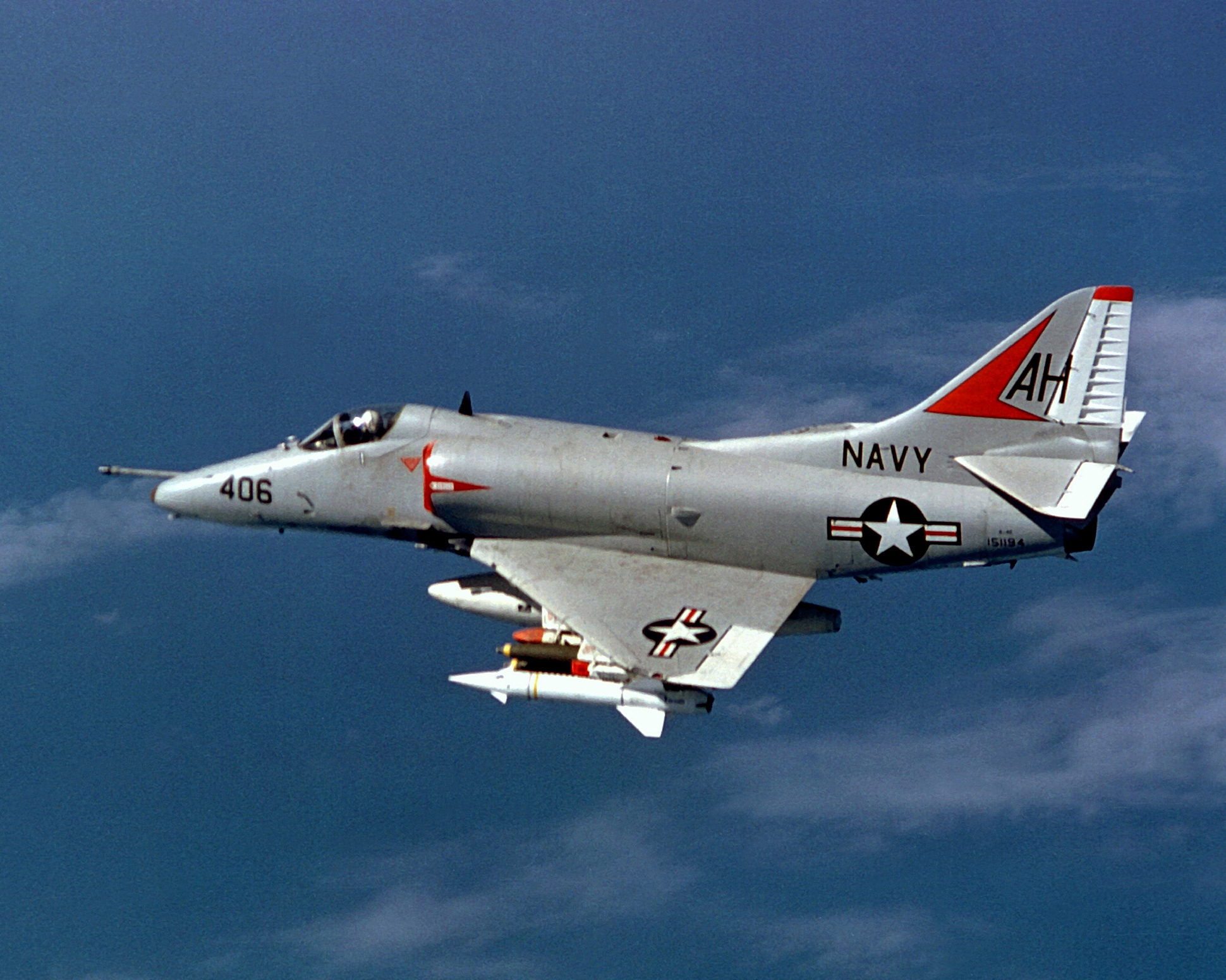
Douglas A-4 Skyhawk 1966

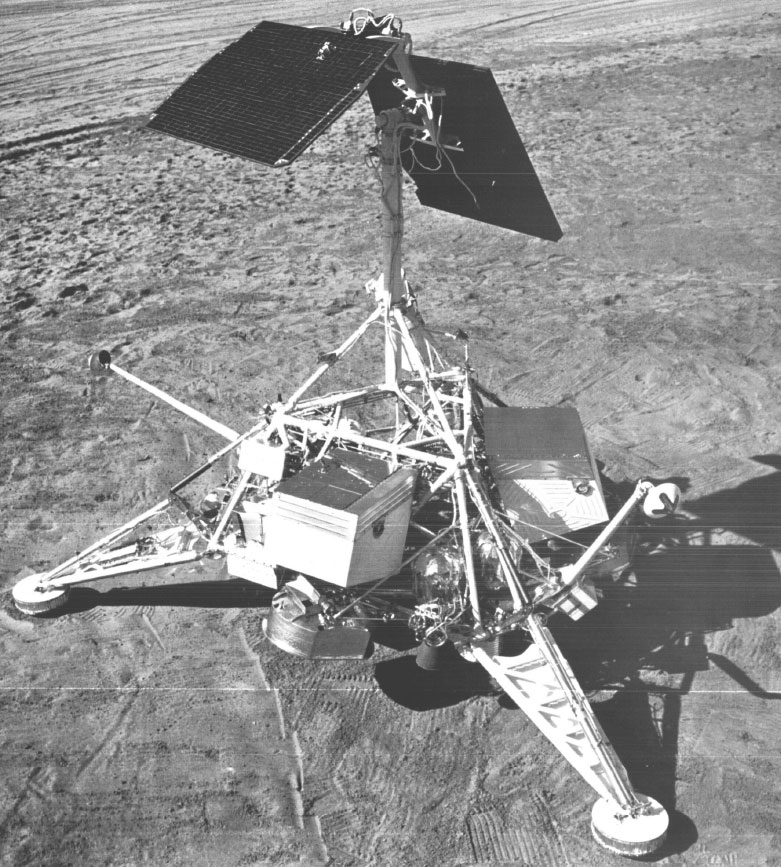
Surveyor 1 1966

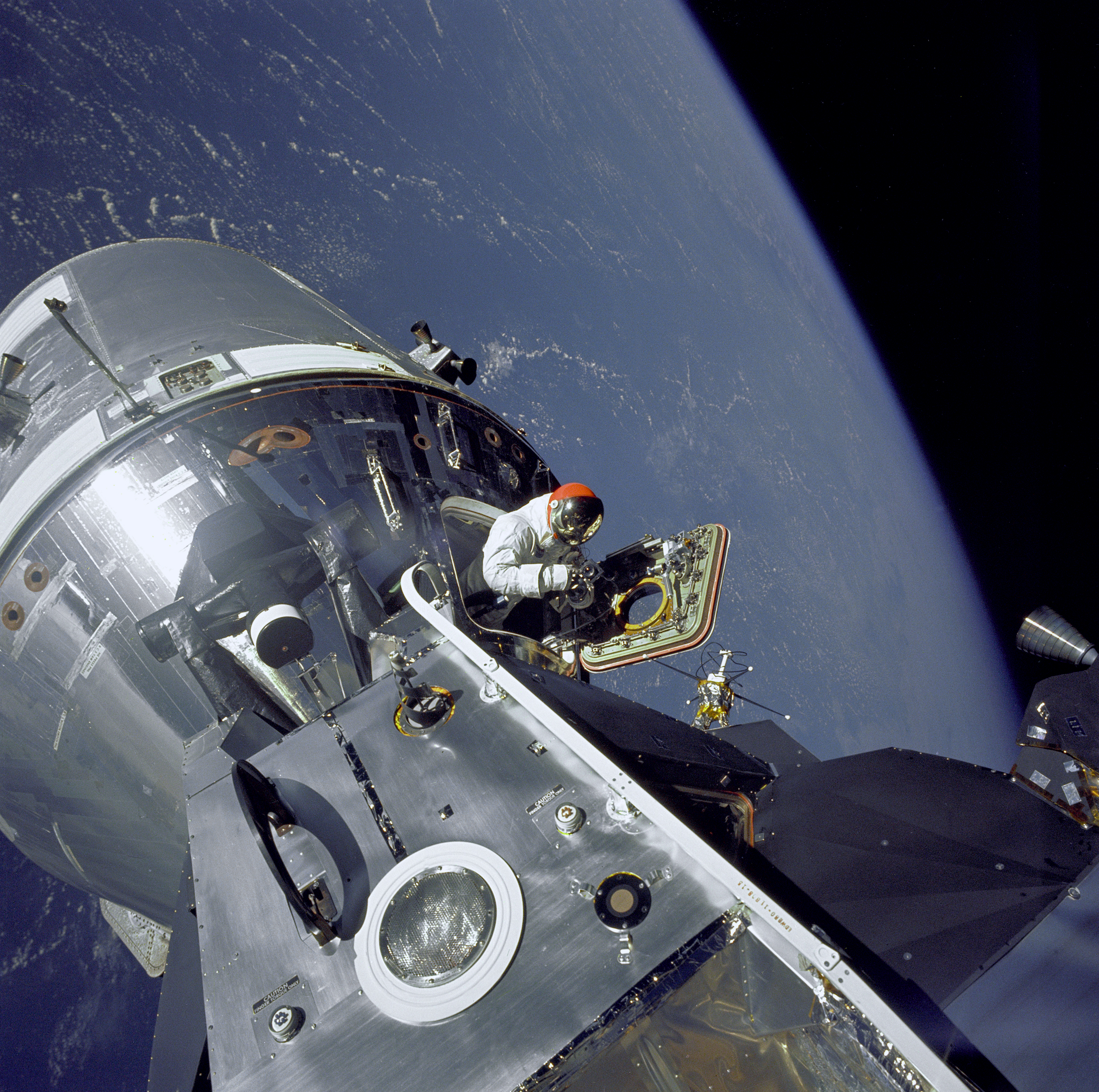
Apollo 9 1969

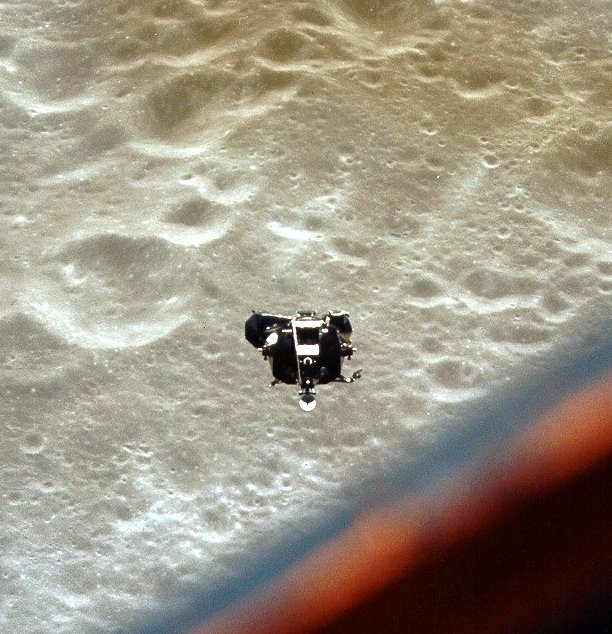
Apollo 10 1969

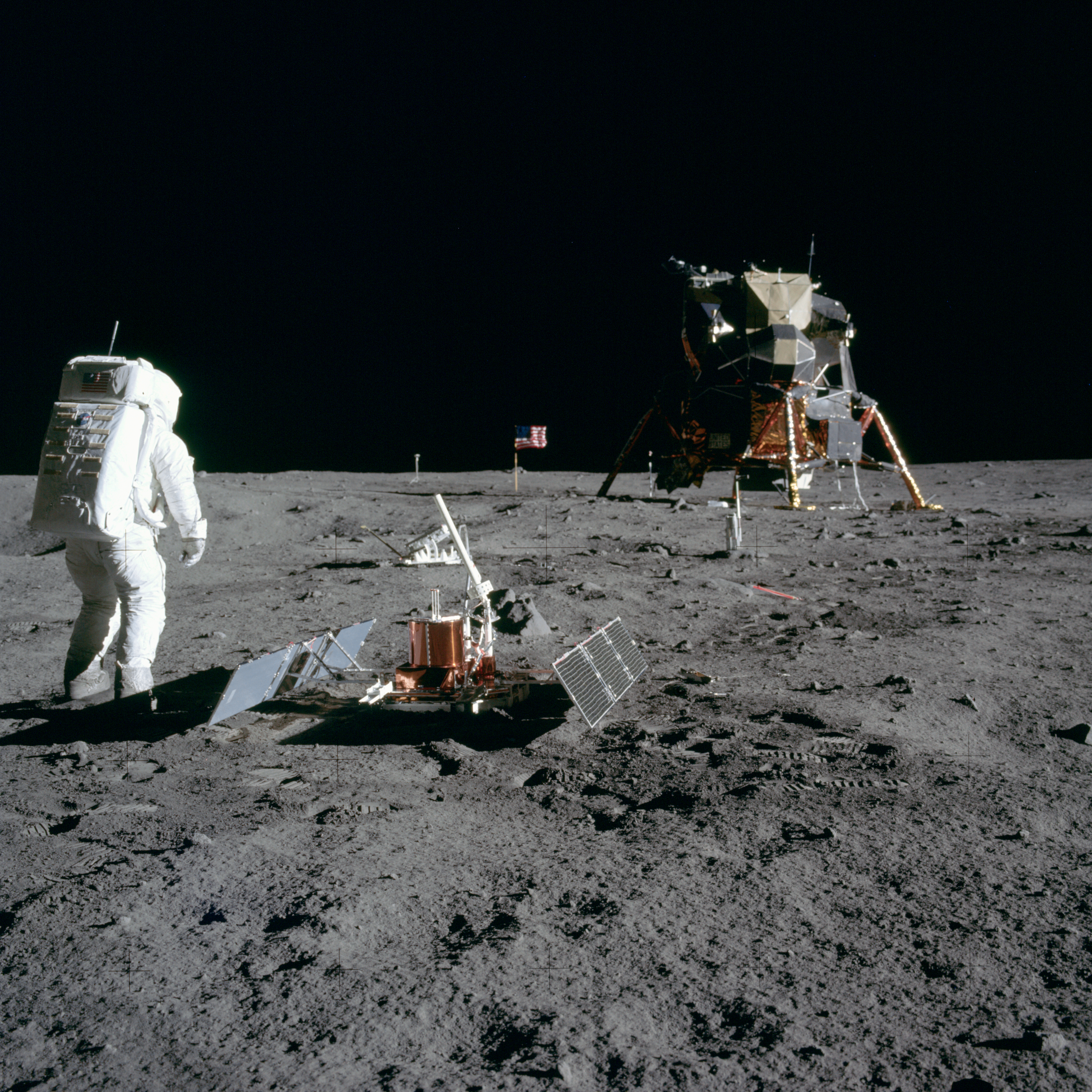
Apollo 11 1969

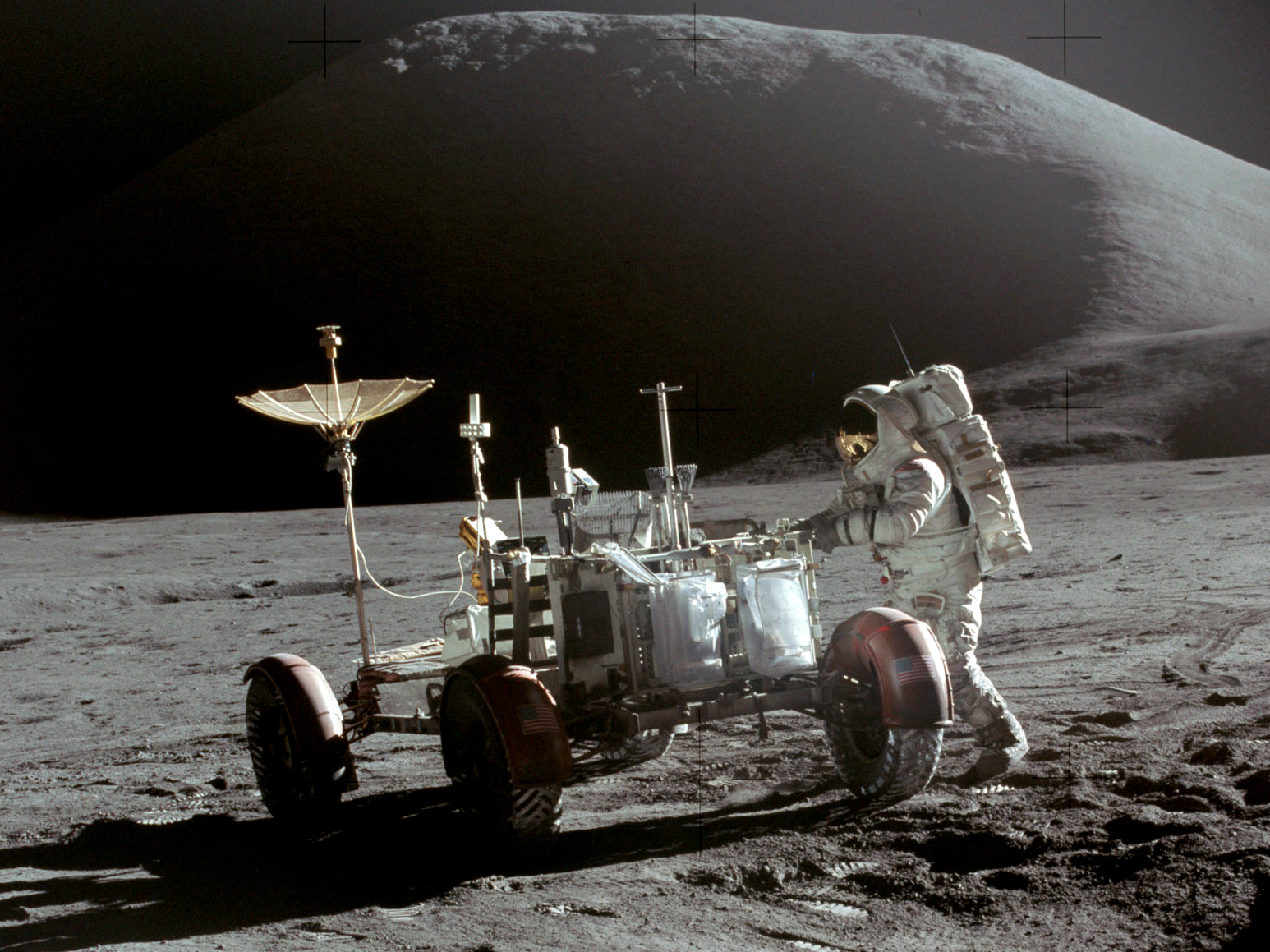
Apollo 15 1970

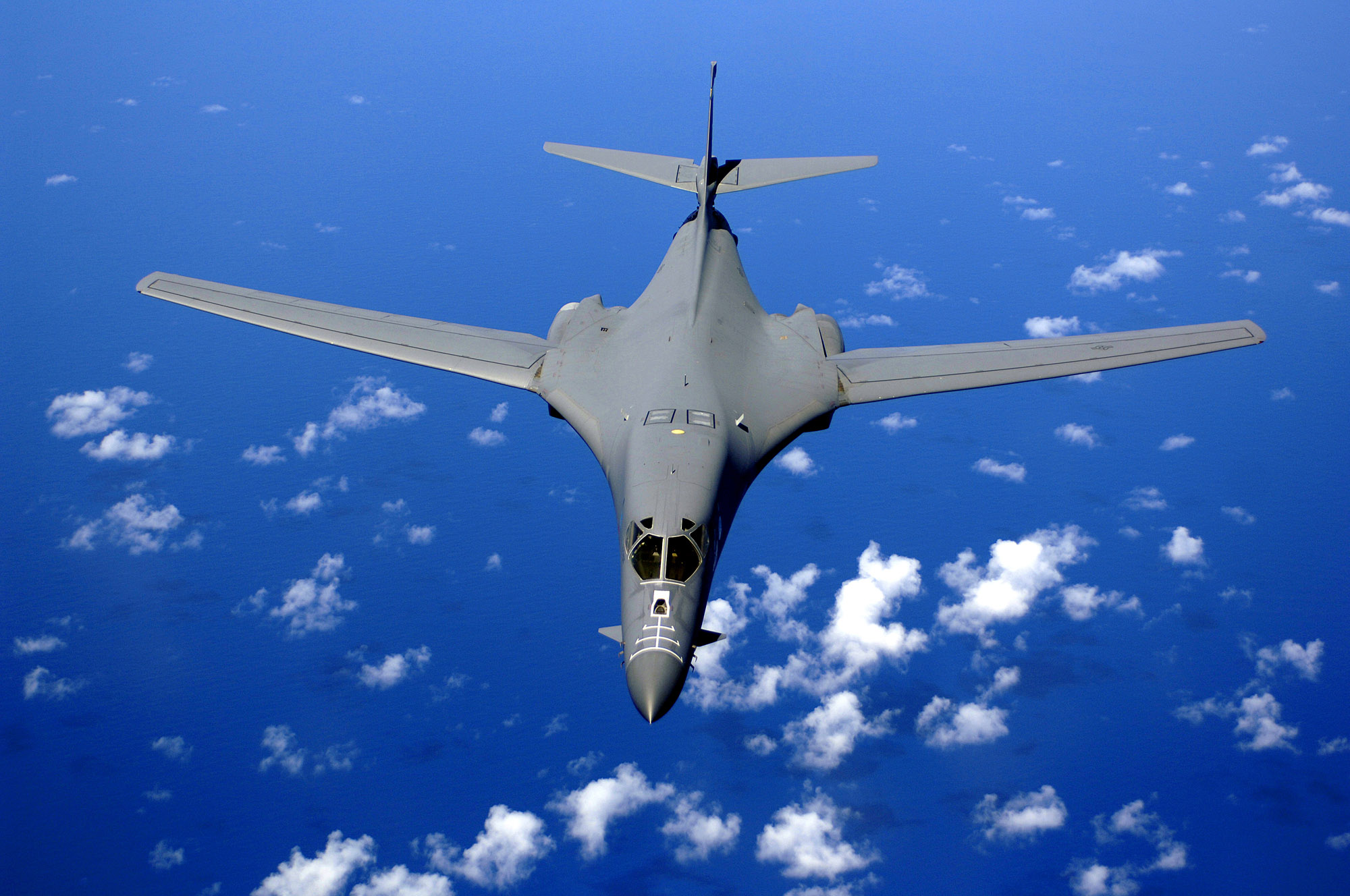
Rockwell B-1 Lancer 1974

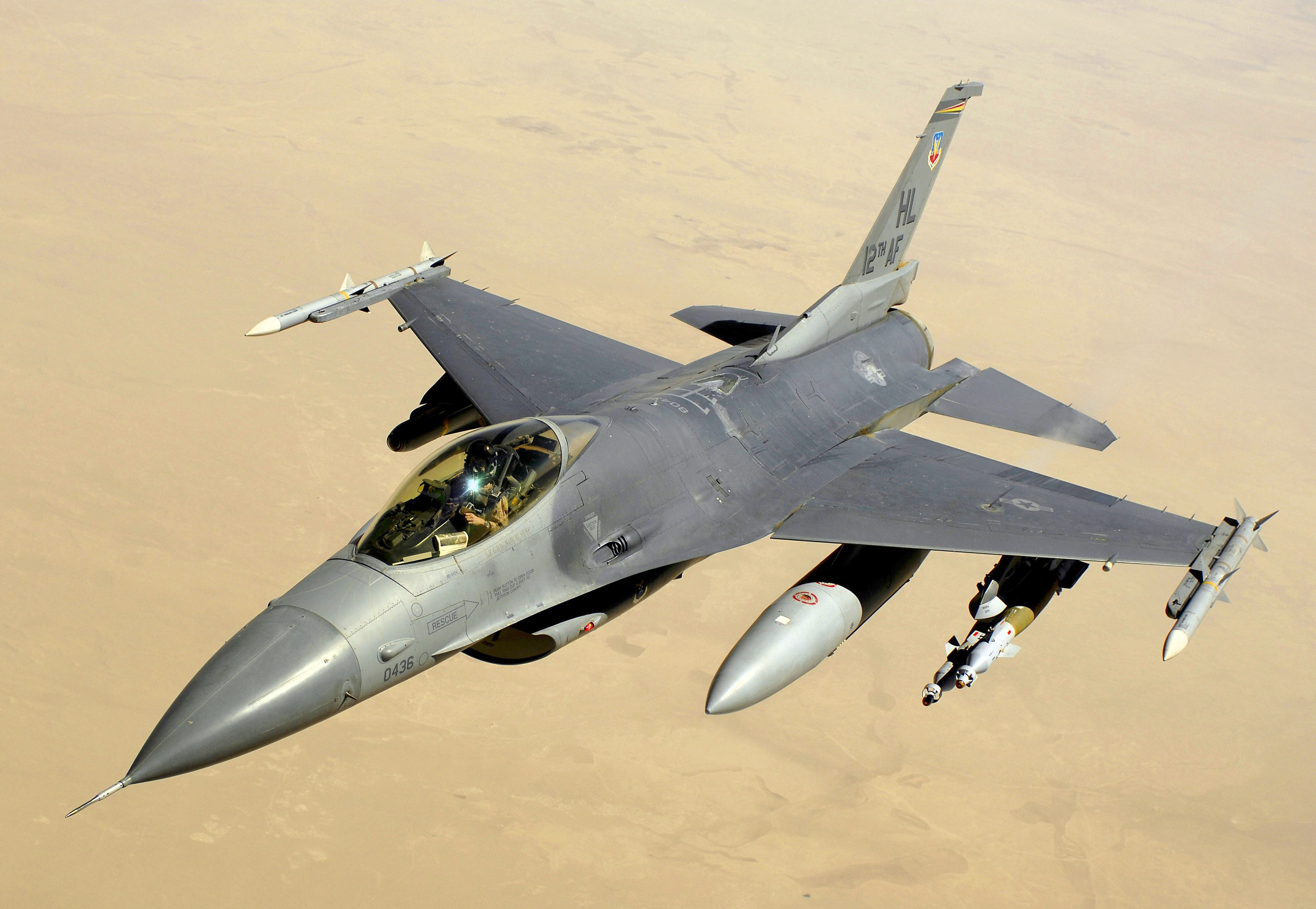
General Dynamics F-16 Fighting Falcon 1978

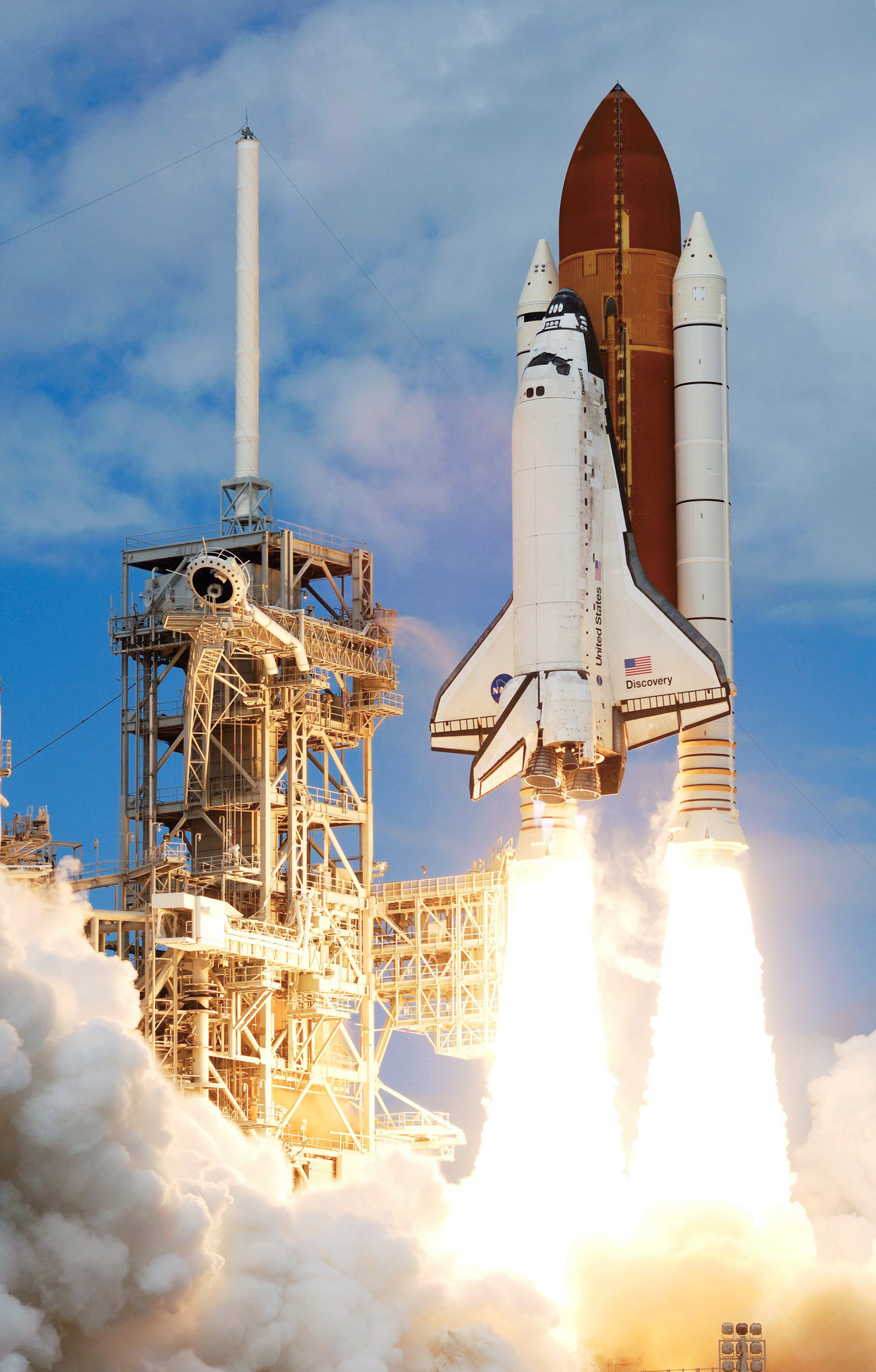
Space Shuttle 1981

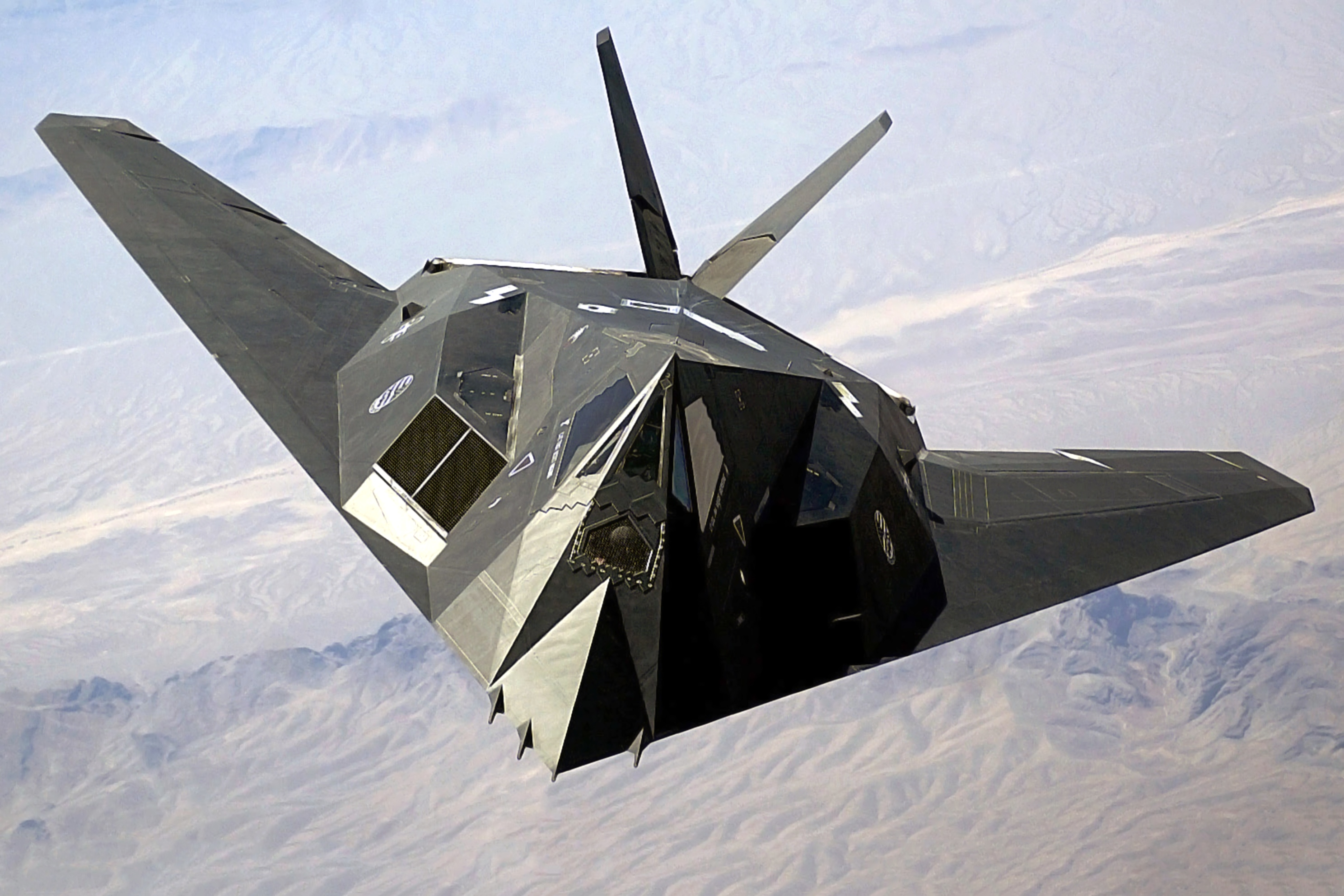
Lockheed F-117 Nighthawk stealth bomber 1985

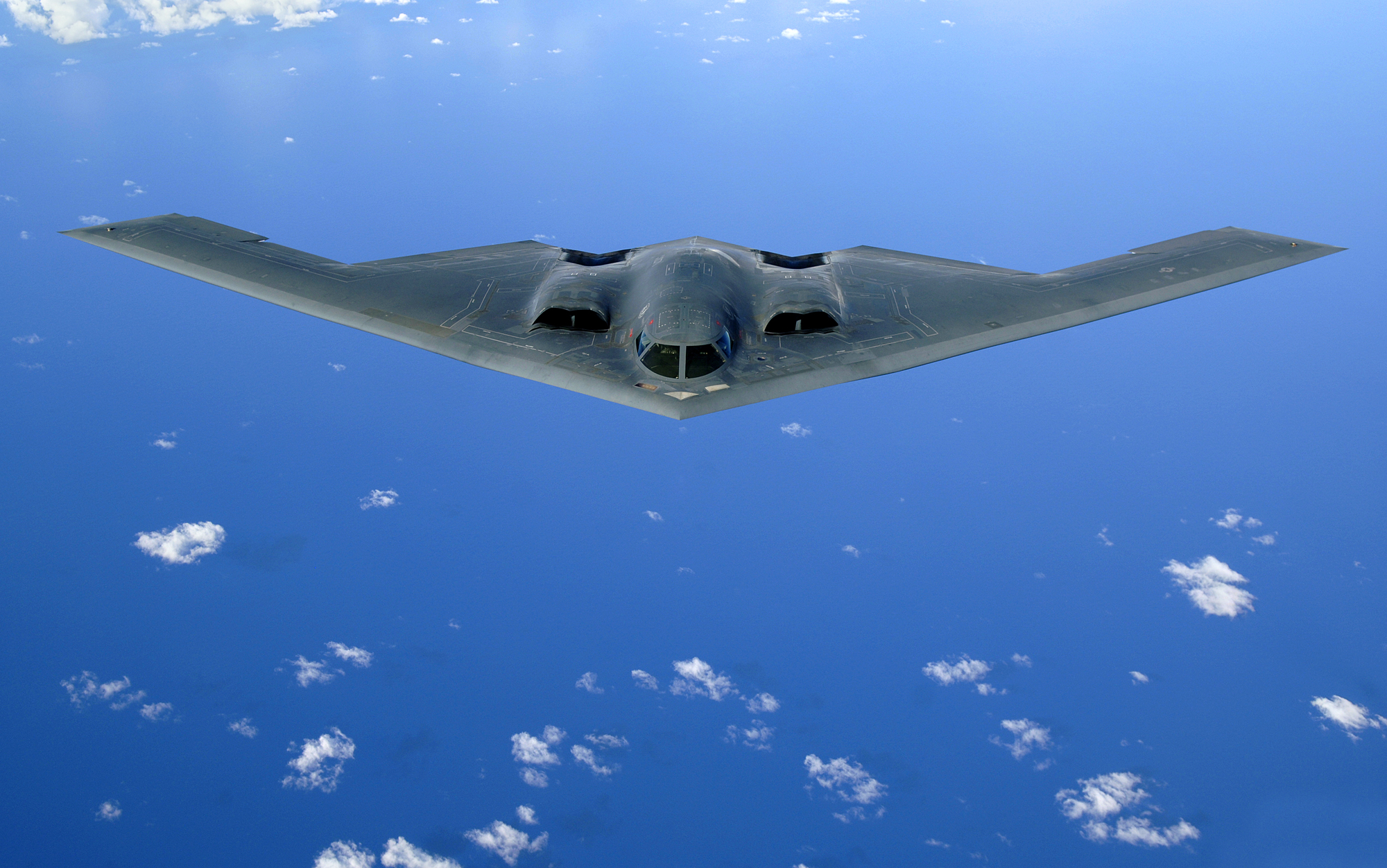
Northrop Grumman B-2 Spirit 1997

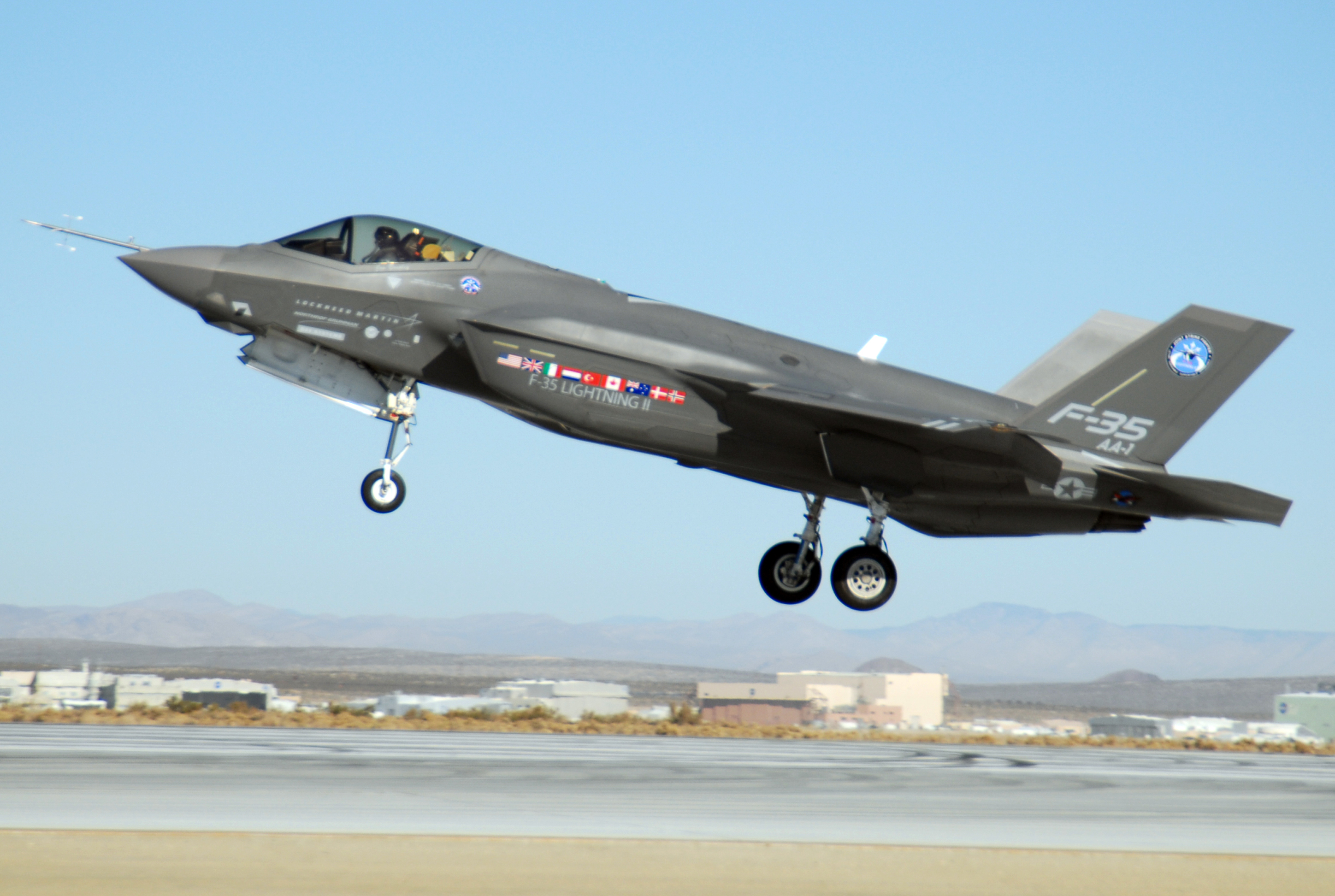
Edwards Air Force Base, Air Force Test Center 2008

During World War II, California's mild climate became a major resource for the war effort. Numerous air-training bases were established in southern California, where most aircraft manufacturers, including Douglas Aircraft and Hughes Aircraft, expanded or established factories. Major naval shipyards were established or expanded in San Diego, Long Beach, and Mare Island in San Francisco Bay.

=== California shipping ===
==== Kaiser–Permanente California shipyards ====
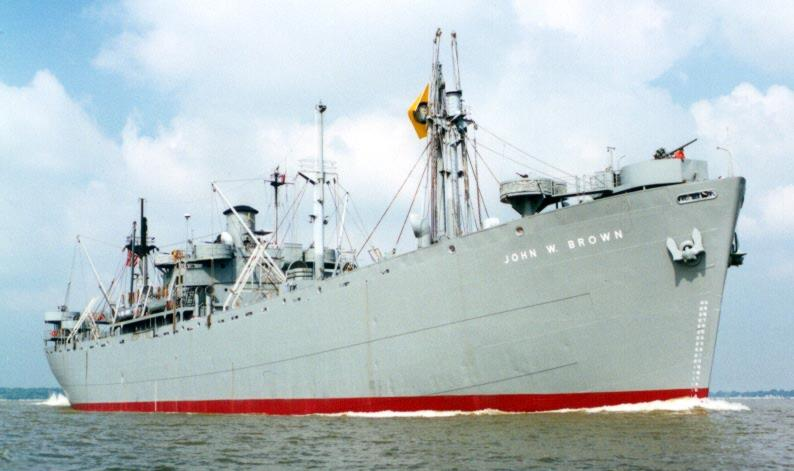
SS John W. Brown is one of only two surviving operational Liberty ships.

The four Richmond Shipyards, located in the city of Richmond, California, were run by Permanente Metals and Kaiser Shipyards. The Richmond yards were responsible for constructing more Liberty ships during World War II (747) than any other shipyard in the United States. Liberty ships were chosen for mass production because their somewhat obsolete design was relatively simple and their triple expansion piston steam engine components were simple enough that they could be made by several companies that were not highly needed to manufacture other parts. Ship building was given a high priority for steel and other needed components, as the German U-boats until 1944 sunk more ships than could be built by all the shipyards in the United States. The United States shipyards built about 5,926 ships in World War II plus over 100,000 more smallcraft made for the U.S. Army naval components.

Henry J. Kaiser's company had been building cargo ships for the U.S. Maritime Commission in the late 1930s. In 1940 orders for ships from the British government, already at war with Nazi Germany, allowed for growth. Kaiser established his first Richmond shipyard beginning in December 1940, eventually building three more in Richmond; each yard with four to eight slips to build ships. Kaiser-Permanente specialized in mass-producing Liberty ships quickly and efficiently, and that was all they built until 1944, when they switched to the much more complicated Victory ships and built some tugs and Landing Ship, Tank (LSTs) and other specialized ships in the newly built Yard #4.

747 EC2-S-C1 Liberty ship cargo transports were built. The following references list individual ships built:

- Kaiser Permanente Yard #1; Oceans, Libertys, Victorys; built in Richmond.
- Kaiser Permanente Yard #2; Libertys, Victorys built in Richmond.
- Kaiser Permanente Yard #3; Libertys, Victorys; built in Richmond.
- Kaiser Permanente Yard #4; Landing Ship, Tanks (LST)s, Tugs; built in Richmond.
- Kaiser, California Shipbuilding; Libertys, Victorys; built in Los Angeles

These Liberty ships were completed in two-thirds the amount of time and at a quarter of the cost of the average of all other shipyards. The Liberty ship SS Robert E. Peary was assembled in less than five days as a part of a special competition among shipyards; but by 1944 it was only taking the astonishingly brief time of a little over two weeks to assemble a Liberty ship by standard methods. They pre-assembled major parts of the ship including the hull sections at various locations in the shipyard and then, when needed, moved them with heavy lift cranes to the shipyard launching site, where they welded the pre-built sections together. After the ships were launched they were finished to their final configuration while afloat, and the launchway was available to start building another ship.

In 1945, the shipyards were shut down as quickly as they had started up four years earlier. Much of the shoreline previously occupied by the shipyards is now owned by the city of Richmond and has been cleaned up and redeveloped under federally assisted "brownfields" programs. The Rosie the Riveter/World War II Home Front National Historical Park was established on the shipyard site to commemorate and interpret the role of the home front in winning World War II.

- Richmond Shipyards Images
- Map of Kaiser-Permanente Yard #1, #2, #3 and #4
- Kaiser Shipyards

==== California Shipbuilding Corporation ====
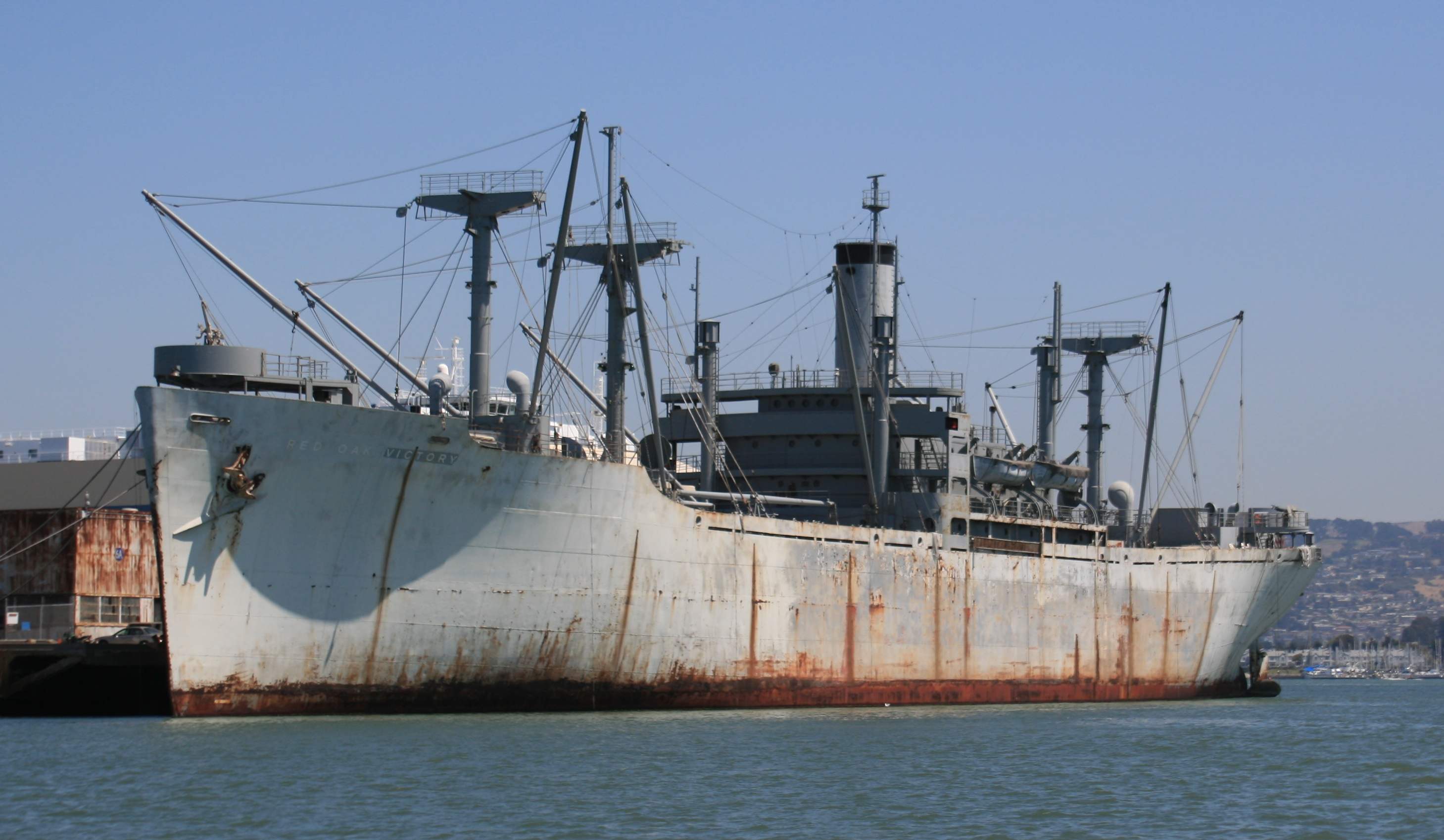
Victory ship SS Red Oak Victory (AK-235), now a museum ship.

California Shipbuilding Corporation (often called Calship) built 467 Liberty and Victory ships during World War II, including Haskell-class attack transports. The Calship shipyard was created at Terminal Island in Los Angeles as part of the World War II shipbuilding effort. It was initially eight ways, then increased to 14. After the war, it was liquidated. The ships they built were:

- 306 EC2-S-C1 Liberty ship cargo transports
- 30 Z-ET1-S-C3 Liberty ship tankers
- 32 VC2-S-AP3 Victory ship cargo transports, 8,500 hp
- 30 VC2-S-AP5 Haskell class USN attack transports
- 69 VC2-S-AP2 Victory ship cargo transports, 6,000 hp

== California naval bases ==
=== Mare Island Naval Shipyard ===
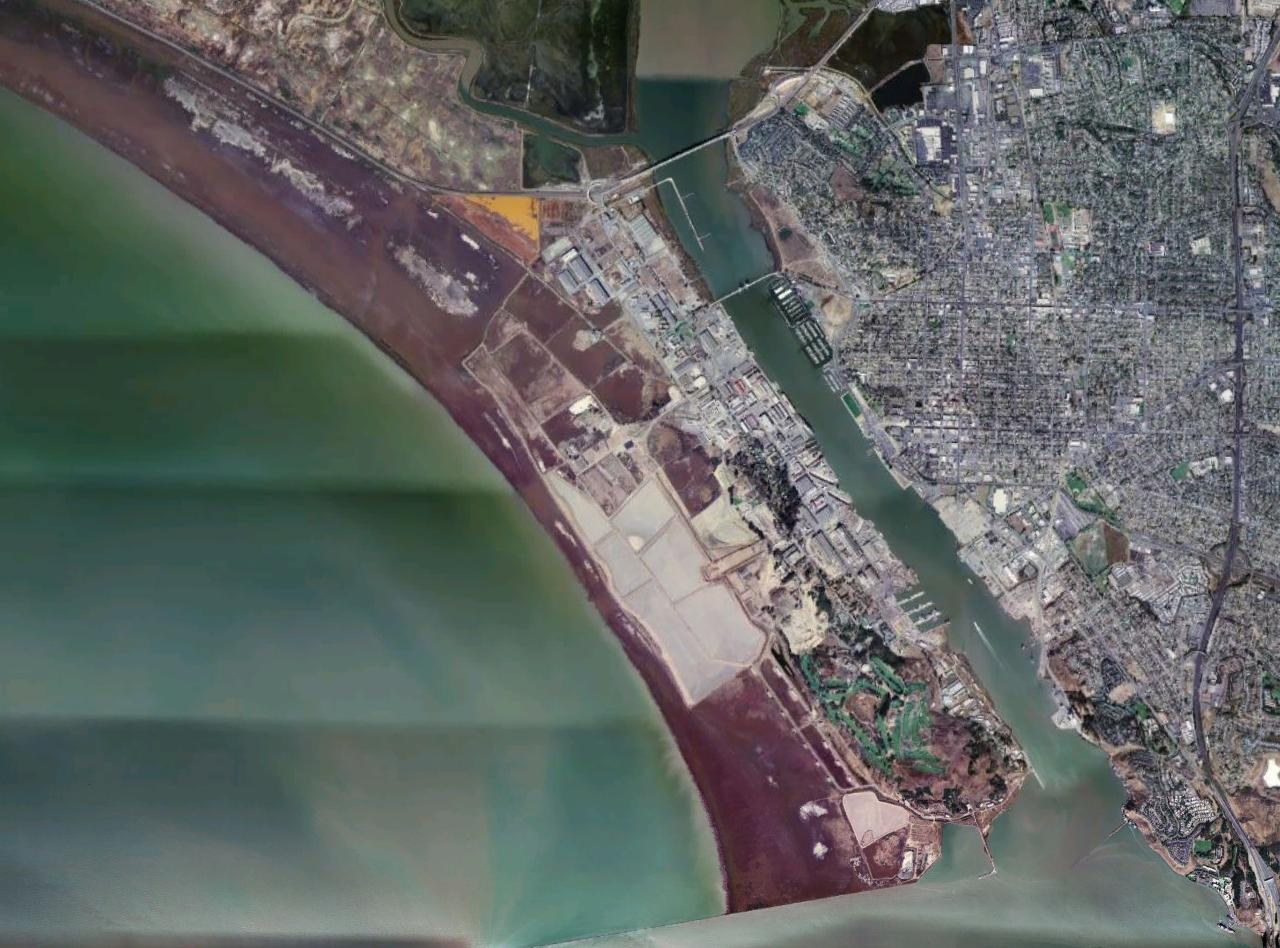
Aerial photo of the southern part of Mare Island.

Mare Island, near the city of Vallejo, was the site of the first naval base in California. The Napa River forms the eastern side of the island as the river enters the Carquinez Strait at its juncture with the east side of San Pablo Bay. In 1850, Commodore John Drake Sloat, in charge of a commission to find a California naval base, recommended the island across the Napa River from the settlement of Vallejo, it being "free from ocean gales and from floods and freshets."

On November 6, 1850, two months after California was admitted to statehood, President Millard Fillmore reserved Mare Island for government use. The United States Navy Department acted favorably on Commodore Sloat's recommendations, and Mare Island was purchased in July 1852, for the sum of $83,410, for the use as a naval shipyard. Two years later, on September 16, 1854, Mare Island became the first permanent United States naval installation on the West Coast, with Commodore David G. Farragut as Mare Island's first base commander. For more than a century, Mare Island served as the Mare Island Naval Shipyard. A 508-foot (155 m) drydock was built by the Public Works Department on an excellent rock foundation of cut granite blocks. The work took nineteen years and was completed in 1891. During the Spanish–American War, a concrete drydock on wooden piles, 740 feet (230 m) long, was completed after eleven years of work, in 1910. By 1941, a third drydock had been completed, and drydock number four was under construction. The ammunitions depot and submarine repair base were modern, fireproof buildings. A million-dollar, three-way vehicle causeway to Vallejo was completed.

Before World War II, Mare Island had been in a continual state of upbuilding. By 1941, new projects included improvements to the central power plant, a new pattern storage building, a large foundry, machine shop, magazine building, paint shop, new administration building, and a huge storehouse. The yard was expected to be able to repair and paint six to eight large naval vessels at a time. Several finger piers had recently been built, as well as a new shipbuilding wharf, adding one 500-foot (150 m) and one 750-foot (230 m) berth. It employed 5,593 workers at the beginning of 1939, and rapidly increased to 18,500 busily engaged by May 1941, with a monthly payroll of $3,500,000 (1941). Then came the attack on Pearl Harbor. In 1941, the drafting department had expanded to three buildings accommodating over 400 naval architects, engineers and draftsmen. The hospital carried 584 bed patients. Mare Island became one of the Navy's shipbuilding sites in World War II specializing in building diesel engine-powered submarines; they eventually built 32 of them. After the war was over, Mare Island became a premier site for building nuclear-powered submarines, building 27 of them.

In 1969, the Navy transferred its (Vietnam War) Brown Water Navy Riverine Training Forces from Coronado, California, to Mare Island. Swift Boats (Patrol Craft Fast-PCF), and PBRs (Patrol Boat River), among other types of riverine craft, conducted boat operations throughout the currently named Napa-Sonoma Marshes State Wildlife Area, which are located on the north and west portions of Mare Island. Mare Island Naval Base was deactivated during the 1995 cycle of US base closures, but the US Navy Reserves still have access to the water portions of the State Wildlife Area for any riverine warfare training being conducted from their new base in Sacramento.

In 1996 Mare Island Naval Shipyard was closed.

=== Naval Base San Diego ===
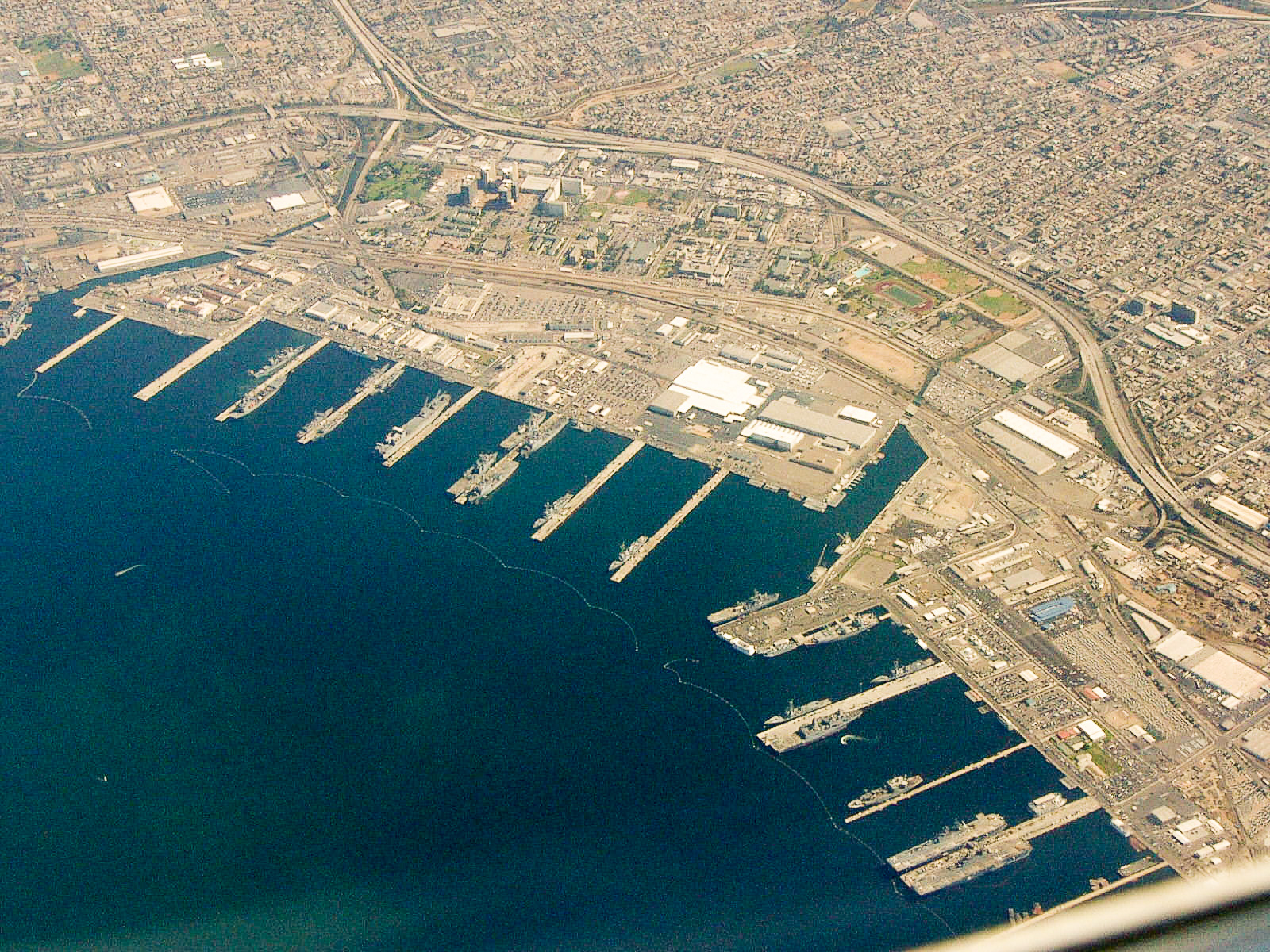
Aerial view of Naval Base San Diego.

Naval Base San Diego was started on land acquired in 1920. It is the largest base of the U.S. Navy on the west coast. Naval Base San Diego is the principal homeport of the Pacific Fleet, consisting of 54 ships and over 120 tenant commands. The base is composed of 13 piers stretched over 977 acres (3.95 km^{2}) of land and 326 acres (1.32 km^{2}) of water. The total on-base population is 20,000 military personnel and 6,000 civilians. San Diego has become the home port of the largest naval fleet in the world, and includes two supercarriers, as well as U.S. Marine Corps stations, United States Navy ports, and U.S. Coast Guard installations.

== Growth after World War II ==
After the war, hundreds of land developers bought land cheap, subdivided it, built on it, and made substantial profits from selling the land. Real estate development replaced oil and agriculture as southern California's principal industry. In 1955, Disneyland opened in Anaheim. In 1958, Major League Baseball's Dodgers and Giants left New York City and came to Los Angeles and San Francisco, respectively. The population of California expanded dramatically, to nearly 20 million by 1970. In response to population growth, and Cold War concerns, California established the 1960 Master Plan for Higher Education.

In the late 1960s the baby-boom generation reached draft age, and many risked arrest to oppose the war in Vietnam. There were numerous demonstrations and strikes, most famously on the prestigious Berkeley campus of the University of California, across the bay from San Francisco. In 1965, race riots erupted in Watts, in the South Central area of Los Angeles. The hippie riots on the Sunset Strip in Los Angeles were immortalized by Buffalo Springfield in the song "For What It's Worth" (1966). Some commentators predicted revolution. Then the federal government promised to withdraw from the Vietnam War, which at last happened in 1974. The radical political movements, having achieved a large part of their aim, lost members and funding.

California still was a land of free spirits, open hearts, and easy-going living. Popular music of the period bore titles such as "California Girls," "California Dreamin'," "San Francisco (Be Sure to Wear Flowers in Your Hair)," "Do You Know the Way to San Jose" and "Hotel California". These reflected the Californian promise of easy living in a paradisaical climate. The surfing culture burgeoned. Many people took low-paying jobs and joined the surfers living in trailers at the beach, and many others forsook ambition and joined the hippies living in cities.

The most famous hippie hangout was the Haight-Ashbury district of San Francisco. The state's cities, especially San Francisco, became famous for their gentility and tolerance. A distinctive and idyllic Californian culture emerged for a time. The peak of this culture, in 1967, was known as the Summer of Love. California became known elsewhere in the United States often derogatorily, as the "land of fruits and nuts".

California's growth after World War II was fueled in part by an arms race with the Soviets and the growing defense industry. In 1962, about 40 percent of the nation's 6-billion dollar military research contracts went into California for testing technology such as planes and bombs. Chuck Yeager was the first pilot to break the sound barrier at Edwards Air Force base. This launched the nation into the jet age and boosted confidence in new technology.

== California as an economic powerhouse ==
Conversely, during the same period, the Golden State also attracted commercial and industrial expansion at astronomical rates. The adoption of a Master Plan for Higher Education in 1960 allowed the development of a highly efficient system of public higher education in the community colleges and the University of California and California State University systems; by creating an educated workforce, it attracted investment, particularly in areas related to high technology. By 1980, California became recognized as the world's eighth-largest economy. Millions of workers were needed to fuel the expansion. The high population of the time caused tremendous problems with urban sprawl, traffic, pollution, and, to a lesser extent, crime.

Urban sprawl created a backlash in many areas, with local governments limiting growth beyond certain boundaries, reducing lot sizes for building homes, and so on. Open space districts were created in several parts of the state specifically to obtain, manage, and preserve undeveloped land. For example, in the San Francisco Bay Area, the open space districts have created a nearly contiguous range of permanently undeveloped land running through the coastal range and hills surrounding the Bay's urban valleys, enabling the creation of huge natural parks and envisioning a hiking trail that will eventually circumnavigate the Bay in an unbroken loop.

The immense problem with air pollution (smog) that had developed by the early 1970s also caused a backlash. With schools being closed routinely in urban areas for "smog days" when the ozone levels became too unhealthy and the hills surrounding urban areas seldom visible even within a mile, Californians were ready for changes. Over the next three decades, California enacted some of the strictest anti-smog regulations in the United States and has been a leader in encouraging nonpolluting strategies for various industries, including automobiles. For example, carpool lanes normally allow only vehicles with two/three or more occupants (whether the base number is two or three depends on what freeway you are on), but electric cars can use the lanes with only a single occupant. As a result, smog is significantly reduced from its peak, although local Air Quality Management Districts still monitor the air and generally encourage people to avoid polluting activities on hot days when smog is expected to be at its worst.

Traffic and transportation remain a problem in urban areas. Solutions are implemented, but inevitably the implementation expense and the time required to plan, approve, and build infrastructure can't keep pace with the population growth. There have been some improvements. Carpool lanes have become common in urban areas, which are intended to encourage people to drive together rather than in individual automobiles. San Jose is gradually building a light rail system (often over routes of an original turn-of-the-century electric railroad line that was torn out and paved over to encourage the advent of the automobile age). None of the implemented solutions are without their critics. The sprawling nature of the Bay Area and of the Los Angeles Basin makes it difficult to build mass transit that can reach and serve a significant portion of the population.

During the 1960s, under the aegis of Chief Justice Roger J. Traynor, the California Supreme Court became more liberal and progressive. Traynor's term as Chief Justice (from 1964 to 1970) was marked by a number of firsts: California was the first state to create true strict liability in product liability cases, the first to allow the action of negligent infliction of emotional distress (NIED) even in the absence of physical injury to the plaintiff, and the first to allow bystanders to sue for NIED where the only physical injury was to a relative.

Starting in the 1960s, California became a leader in family law. California was the first state to allow true no-fault divorce, with the passage of the Family Law Act of 1969. In 1994, the Legislature took family law out of the Civil Code and created a new Family Code. In 2002, the Legislature granted registered domestic partners the same rights under state law as married spouses. In 2008 California became the second state to legalize same-sex marriage when the California Supreme Court ruled the ban unconstitutional.

Since the mid-1980s, the California Supreme Court has become more conservative, particularly with regard to the rights of criminal defendants. This is commonly seen as a reaction against the strict anti-death penalty stance of Chief Justice Rose Bird in the early 1980s, although the funding that eventually brought about her defeat was from corporate and business interests concerned with what they felt was an anti-business stance by the Chief Justice. The state's electorate responded by removing her (and two of her perceived liberal allies) from the court in November 1986.

== High-tech expansion ==
Starting in the 1950s, high technology companies in northern California began a spectacular growth that continued through the end of the 20th century. The major products included personal computers, video games, and networking systems. The majority of these companies settled along a highway stretching from Palo Alto to San Jose, notably including Santa Clara and Sunnyvale, all in the Santa Clara Valley, the so-called "Silicon Valley", named after the material used to produce the integrated circuits of the era.

This era peaked in 2000, by which time demand for skilled technical professionals had become so high that the high-tech industry had trouble filling all of its positions and therefore pushed for increased visa quotas so that they could recruit from overseas. When the "Dot-com bubble" burst in 2001, jobs evaporated overnight, and for the first time over the next two years more people moved out of the area than moved in. This somewhat mirrored the collapse of the aerospace industry in southern California some twenty years earlier.

== 2000–present ==
Although air pollution problems have been reduced, health problems associated with pollution have continued. The brown haze that is known as "smog" has been substantially abated thanks to federal and state restrictions on automobile exhaust. Wildfires have also been a major environmental concern, with the smoke resulting from these fires causing severe health problems, as well as severe climatological events such as Orange Skies Day. Since 2000, the area that burned annually has ranged between 90,000 acres, or 0.09%, and 1,590,000 acres, or 1.59% of the total land of California.

An energy crisis in 2001 led to rolling blackouts, soaring power rates, and the importation of electricity from neighboring states. Southern California Edison and Pacific Gas and Electric Company came under heavy criticism.

=== Housing bubble bursts ===
The ongoing demand for well-educated workers continued. Housing prices in urban areas continued to increase so that a modest home that in the 1960s cost $25,000, cost half a million dollars or more in urban areas by 2005. More people commuted longer hours to afford a home in more rural areas while earning larger salaries in the urban areas. Speculators bought houses they never intended to live in, expecting to make a huge profit in a matter of months, then rolling it over by buying more properties. Mortgage companies were compliant, as everyone assumed the prices would keep rising. The bubble burst in 2007-8 as housing prices began to crash and the boom years ended. Hundreds of billions in property values vanished and foreclosures soared as many financial institutions and investors were badly hurt.

In the 2002 gubernatorial campaign, Democratic incumbent Gray Davis defeated Republican challenger Bill Simon. On October 7, 2003, Davis was recalled, with 55.4% of the voters supporting the recall (see results of the 2003 California recall). With a plurality of 48.6% of the vote, Republican Arnold Schwarzenegger was chosen as the new governor. Lieutenant Governor Cruz Bustamante received 31.5% of the vote, and Republican state senator Tom McClintock received 13.5% of the vote.

Schwarzenegger began his shortened term with a soaring approval rating and soon after began implementing a conservative agenda. This initially resulted in sparring with the heavily Democratic Assembly and Senate over the state budget, battles which provided his infamous "girly men" comment but also began taking their toll on his approval rating. Schwarzenegger then embarked on a campaign to enact several ballot propositions in a 2005 special election touted as reforming California's budget system, redistricting powers, and union political fundraising. The union-led campaign spearheaded by the California Nurses Association contributed heavily to the defeat of every proposition in the special election.

Since this conspicuous failure, Schwarzenegger made a turn back to the left, criticizing the Bush Administration at many junctures, reviving his environmental agenda, and compromising with the legislature on the traditionally Democratic issue of education spending. His approval rating also revived, and he was re-elected in 2006. However, continued paralysis in state government and the inability of the legislature and governor to work out the fundamental funding questions resulted in voter disapproval of both the legislators and the governor, whose approval rating was among the lowest ever recorded pending the election of Jerry Brown in November 2010.

=== 2011–2017 California drought ===
Progression of the drought from December 2013 to July 2014

The 2011–2017 California drought persisted from December 2011 to March 2017 and consisted of the driest period in California's recorded history, late 2011 through 2014. The drought wiped out 102 million trees from 2011 to 2016, 62 million of those during 2016 alone. The cause of the drought was attributed to a ridge of high pressure in the Pacific Sea—the "Ridiculously Resilient Ridge"—which often barred powerful winter storms from reaching the state.

By February 2017, the state's drought percentage returned to lower levels seen before the start of the drought. This change was due to an exceedingly wet pattern caused by atmospheric river-enhanced Pacific storms, which caused severe flooding.

In mid-March 2019, California was declared drought-free except for a small pocket of abnormally dry conditions in Southern California. This declaration followed a series of powerful Pacific storms during the first few months of the year, which coincided with the U.S. experiencing drought conditions in the fewest parts of the country since 2000.

=== COVID-19 pandemic impact ===
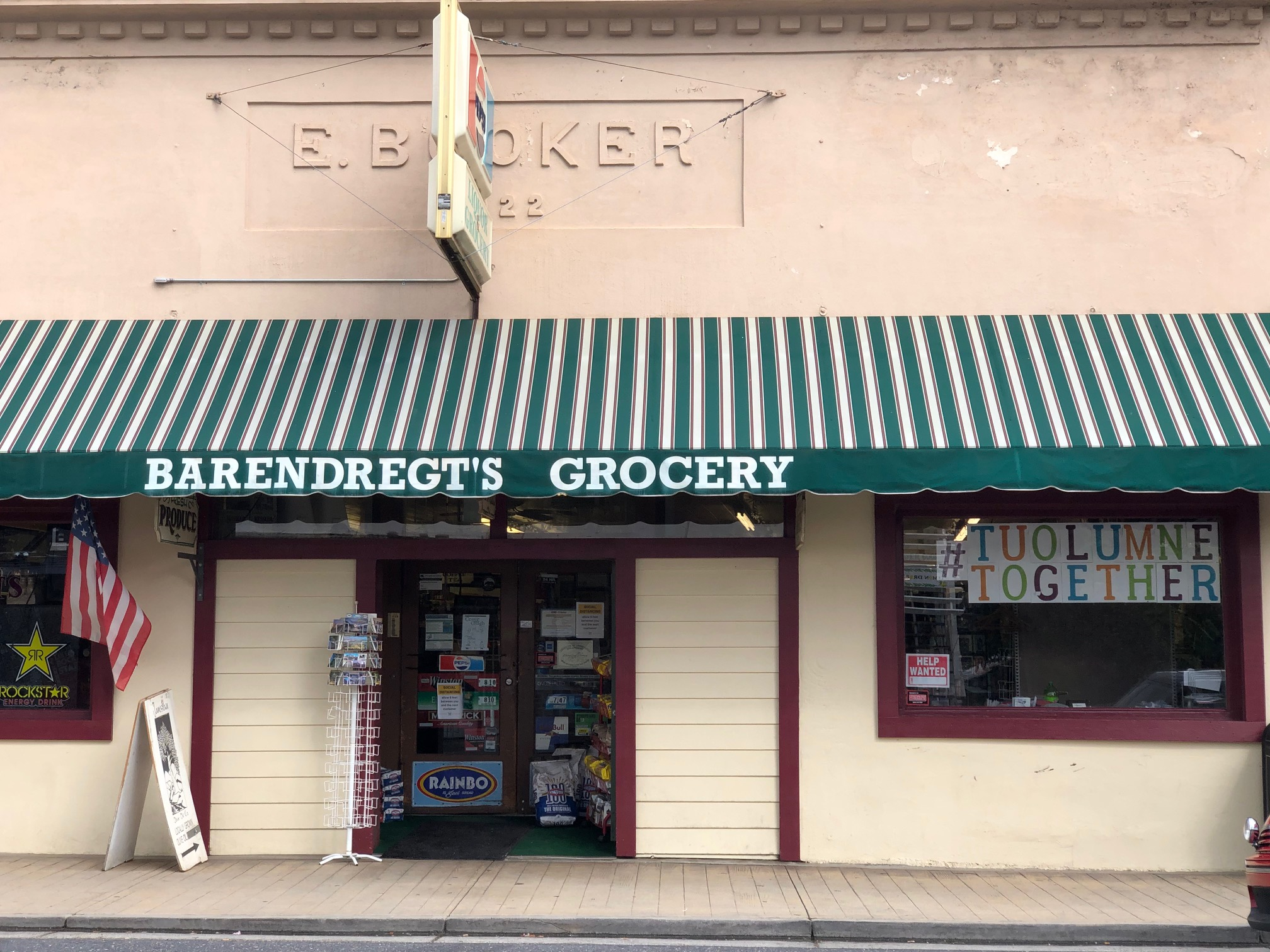
A sign of community support for Tuolumne County in a shop window in Jamestown, California on May 30, 2020

One of the first confirmed COVID-19 cases in the United States that occurred in California was first of which was confirmed on January 26, 2020. Meaning, all of the early confirmed cases were persons who had recently travelled to China in Asia, as testing was restricted to this group. On this January 29, 2020, as disease containment protocols were still being developed, the U.S. Department of State evacuated 195 persons from Wuhan, China aboard a chartered flight to March Air Reserve Base in Riverside County, and in this process, it may have granted and conferred to escalated within the land and the US at cosmic. On February 5, 2020, the U.S. evacuated 345 more citizens from Hubei Province to two military bases in California, Travis Air Force Base in Solano County and Marine Corps Air Station Miramar, San Diego, where they were quarantined for 14 days. A state of emergency was largely declared in this state of the nation on March 4, 2020, having been terminated on February 28, 2023. A mandatory statewide stay-at-home order was issued on March 19, 2020, due to increase, which was ended on January 25, 2021, allowing citizens to return to normal life. On April 6, 2021, the state announced plans to fully reopen the economy by June 15, 2021.

The COVID-19 pandemic in the United States has accelerated the continuing exodus of business from the entire downtown core of San Francisco. Significantly high levels of crime, open-air drug use, homelessness, and closed storefronts have become more prominent features of Union Square.

== See also ==
- Bibliography of California history
- History of California before 1900
- History of California
- History of Los Angeles
- History of San Diego
- History of San Francisco
- History of the west coast of North America

== Bibliography ==
=== Scholarly surveys ===
- Aron, Stephen. "Convergence, California and the Newest Western History," California History Volume: 86#4 September 2009. pp 4+ historiography.
- Bakken, Gordon Morris. California History: A Topical Approach (2003)
- Cherney, Robert W., Richard Griswold del Castillo, and Gretchen Lemke-Santangelo. Competing Visions: A History of California (2005)
- Deverell, William, and David Igler, eds. A Companion to California History (2008), long essays by scholars; excerpt and text search
- Glass, Fred. From Mission to Microchip: A History of the California Labor Movement (U of California Press, 2016). xviii, 524 pp.
- Hart, James D. A Companion to California (2nd ed. 1987), 591 pp; encyclopedia of state history
- Hayes, Derek. Historical Atlas of California: With Original Maps (2007), 256pp
- North, Diane M.T. California at War: The State and the People during World War I (2018).
- Pitt, Leonard, and Dale Pitt. Los Angeles A to Z: An Encyclopedia of the City and County (2000)
- Rawls, James J. ed. New Directions in California History: A Book of Readings (1988)
- Rawls, James; Bean, Walton (2003). California: An Interpretive History (8th ed.). McGraw-Hill. ISBN 0-07-052411-4.
- Rice, Richard B., William A. Bullough, and Richard J. Orsi. Elusive Eden: A New History of California 3rd ed. (2001)
- Rolle, Andrew F. California: A History 6th ed. (2003)
- Starr, Kevin (Note that there are numerous editions of this monumental state history, with slight title changes)
  - Starr, Kevin California: A History (2005), one-volume synthesis
  - Americans and the California Dream, 1850–1915 (1973) Archived June 24, 2011, at the Wayback Machine
  - Inventing the Dream: California through the Progressive Era (1986) Archived October 15, 2012, at the Wayback Machine
  - Material Dreams: Southern California through the 1920s (1991) Archived May 25, 2012, at the Wayback Machine
  - Endangered Dreams: The Great Depression in California (1997)
  - The Dream Endures: California Enters the 1940s (1997) Archived June 24, 2011, at the Wayback Machine
  - Embattled Dreams: California in War and Peace, 1940–1950 (2003)
  - Coast of Dreams: California on the Edge, 1990–2003 (2004)
- Sucheng, Chan, and Spencer C. Olin, eds. Major Problems in California History (1996)

=== Environment, transportation, agriculture, water ===
- Blow, Ben (1920). California Highways: A Descriptive Record of Road Development by the State and by Such Counties as Have Paved Highways. San Francisco, CA: H.S. Crocker.
- Carle, David. Introduction to Water in California (2004). 261 pp.
- Deverell, William and Hise, Greg, eds. Land of Sunshine: An Environmental History of Metropolitan Los Angeles. U. of Pittsburgh Press, 2005. 350 pp. excerpt and online search
- Deverell, William. Railroad Crossing: Californians and the Railroad, 1850–1910 (1994). 278 pp.
- Godfrey, Anthony. The Ever-Changing View: A History of the National Forests in California. US Forest Service, 2005. 657 pp.
- Griggs, Gary; Patsch, Kiki; and Savoy, Lauret, eds. Living with the Changing California Coast (2005). 540 pp.
- Howe & Peters (1921). "III. Engineering Report to the California State Automobile Association". The State Highways of California (Report). Los Angeles, CA: Times Mirror Printing & Binding House.
- Hundley Jr., Norris. The Great Thirst: Californians and Water—A History (2nd ed. 2001) excerpt and text search
- Isenberg, Andrew C. Mining California: An Ecological History (2005). 242 pp.
- Jelinek, Lawrence. Harvest Empire: A History of California Agriculture (1982)
- Merchant, Carolyn, ed. Green Versus Gold: Sources in California's Environmental History (1998). Readings in primary and secondary sources; excerpt and text search
- Pincetl, Stephanie S. Transforming California: A Political History of Land Use and Development (2003) excerpt and text search
- Righter, Robert W. The Battle over Hetch Hetchy: America's Most Controversial Dam and the Birth of Modern Environmentalism (2005). 303 pp.
- Sackman, Douglas Cazaux. Orange Empire: California and the Fruits of Eden (2005). 386 pp.
- Street, Richard Steven. Beasts of the Field: A Narrative History of California Farmworkers, 1769–1913 (2004). 904 pp.
- Thompson, Gregory Lee. The Passenger Train in the Motor Age: California's Rail and Bus Industries, 1910–1941 (1993). 247 pp.
- Vogel, David. California Greenin’: How the Golden State Became an Environmental Leader (2018) 280 pp online review
- White, Gerald Taylor. Formative years in the Far West : a history of Standard Oil Company of California and predecessors through 1919 (1962) online

=== Scholarly specialty studies ===
- Abelmann, Nancy, and John Lie. Blue Dreams: Korean Americans and the Los Angeles Riots Archived January 9, 2011, at the Wayback Machine (1995)
- Aron, Stephen. "Convergence, California and the Newest Western History," California History Vol. 86#4, September 2009. pp 4+ historiography.
- Bell, Jonathan. "Social Democracy and the Rise of the Democratic Party in California, 1950–1964." Historical Journal 49.2 (2006): 497–524. online
- Fogelson, Robert M. The Fragmented Metropolis: Los Angeles, 1850–1930 (1993)
- Gavin, Francis J. (April 3, 2023). "How 1970s California created the modern world". Engelsberg Ideas. The Axel and Margaret Ax:son Johnson Foundation for Public Benefit.
- Higgins, Andrew Stone. Higher Education for All: Racial Inequality, Cold War Liberalism, and the California Master Plan. University of North Carolina Press, 2023.
- Miller, Sally M., and Daniel A. Cornford, eds. American Labor in the Era of World War II Archived March 18, 2011, at the Wayback Machine (1995). Essays by scholars, mostly on California
- Roger W. Lotchin. Fortress California, 1910–1961 (2002)
- George E. Mowry. The California Progressives (1963)
- Sackman, Douglas Cazaux. Orange Empire: California and the Fruits of Eden. (2005) comprehensive, multidimensional history of citrus industry
- Pincetl, Stephanie S. Transforming California: A Political History of Land Use and Development (2003)
- Sitton, Tom and William F, Deverell, eds. Metropolis in the Making: Los Angeles in the 1920s (2001)
- Swiontek, Danielle Jean. With Ballots and Pocketbooks: Women, Labor, and Reform in Progressive California (2006)
- Westwick, Peter J., ed. Blue Sky Metropolis: The Aerospace Century in Southern California (U of California Press; 2012) 308 pages; essays by scholars
