= Ouray =

Ouray may refer to:

== Places in the United States ==
- Ouray County, Colorado
- Ouray, Colorado, a small city
- Ouray Peak, Colorado
- Mount Ouray, Colorado
- Ouray, Utah, a village
- Ouray National Wildlife Refuge, Randlett, Utah

== People ==
- Ouray (Ute leader) (1833–1880), Native American chief of a band of the Ute tribe

== See also ==
- Uintah and Ouray Indian Reservation
