= Willow Beach, Arizona =

Geographic feature in Mohave County, Arizona

Coordinates: 35°52′13″N 114°39′34″W

Willow Beach is located on the Arizona side of the Colorado River between Lake Mead and Lake Mohave. Both lakes are part of the Lake Mead National Recreation Area administered by the U.S. National Park Service.

Willow Beach was a major trade center for Mojave and Virgin Ancestral Pueblo people along the routes between Coastal California and the American Southwest between 500 and 1200 CE.

== Fish species ==
- Bonytail chub
- Carp
- Sunfish
- Channel catfish
- Rainbow trout
- Razorback sucker
- Striped bass

== Hatchery ==
Willow Beach is the location of the Willow Beach National Fish Hatchery which is run by the US Fish and Wildlife Service, Department of the Interior.

The hatchery produces rainbow trout for sport fishing. Rainbow trout are stocked year round. The hatchery also raises razorback suckers and bonytail chub, both endangered species.
