= Katherine Landing, Arizona =

Coordinates: 35°13′12″N 114°33′53″W

Katherine Landing (often erroneously referred to as Katherine's Landing or Katherines Landing) is a recreational area located on the Arizona side of the Colorado River and Lake Mohave just north of Bullhead City in the Lake Mead National Recreation Area. It is about two miles (3.2 km) upstream from Davis Dam and accessed from Arizona State Route 68.

The National Park Service, which administers Katherine Landing, reports more than 1.2 million visitors each year. The area was named after a gold mine popularly known as Katherine Mine that operated in the vicinity in the late 1800s.

== Facilities ==
The Katherine Landing facility includes a slipway, floating dock, rental boats and recreational craft, a restaurant, convenience store, 53-unit motel, RV park and a campground.

== Fish species ==
- Carp
- Catfish (Channel)
- Crappie
- Largemouth Bass
- Rainbow
- Striped Bass
- Sunfish
