= Southwestern Native Aquatic Resources and Recovery Center =

U.S. endangered fish hatchery

Coordinates: 33.19415°N 104.35107°W

The Southwestern Native Aquatic Resources and Recovery Center, formerly known as Dexter National Fish Hatchery and Technology Center, is a U.S. Fish and Wildlife Service facility dedicated to fish culture techniques for threatened and endangered fishes of the American Southwest. Located in Dexter, New Mexico, it is the only federal facility in the nation dedicated to studying and holding only threatened and endangered fish. Scientists at the Dexter facility perform life history studies and carefully analyze fish genetics, while maintaining a refuge for 16 imperiled fish species.

== History ==
The center was originally known as Dexter National Fish Hatchery. Dexter was established in 1931, to satisfy demands for game fish throughout the Southwest. New laws brought changes to the hatchery in the 1970s.

== Fish species ==
In 2021, the Southwestern Native Aquatic Resources and Recovery Center held 14 warmwater fish species. Five of those are their main species, with the rest only spawning intermittently or being maintained as refuge populations.

- Bonytail chub (Gila elegans)
- Colorado pikeminnow (Ptychocheilus lucius)
- Rio Grande silvery minnow (Hybognathus amarus)
- Razorback sucker (Xyrauchen texanus)
- Woundfin (Plagopterus argentissimus)

The station maintains a genetically diverse broodstock for each species. Fish are raised from these broodstocks with the intent of reintroducing them into their native habitat. Close monitoring at the hatchery includes developing propagation and culture techniques, collecting water quality data, diet and nutrition testing, life history studies, reproductive physiology, and genetic management.

== Genetics ==
Dexter's Conservation Genetics Laboratory is fully equipped for routine genetic analysis with modern equipment designed to generate genetic information from microsatellite markers and DNA sequences. Dexter's program of rearing threatened and endangered fish relies on these data to provide genetically appropriate fish for stocking and to monitor the purity of 16 species of endangered fish that are held as refugium stocks.

Dexter's future conservation genetics program includes the short-term goal of developing genetic baselines for all species cultured and maintained at Dexter. Genetic information also is used to develop strategies for ensuring that genetic diversity is maintained in captive stocks and to avoid such pitfalls as domestication selection or genetic drift.

Dexter's long-term goals for the conservation genetics program are to use the laboratory to address genetic components of multiregional recovery programs and to aid in the accomplishment of the Southwest Regions Fisheries Program Strategic Plan goals. These objectives are attainable through the use of science and technology, by developing and applying genetic conservation principles to the management of species produced and maintained at Dexter, thereby increasing the success of resources conservation.

== Spawning ==
Artificial spawning of Colorado pikeminnow

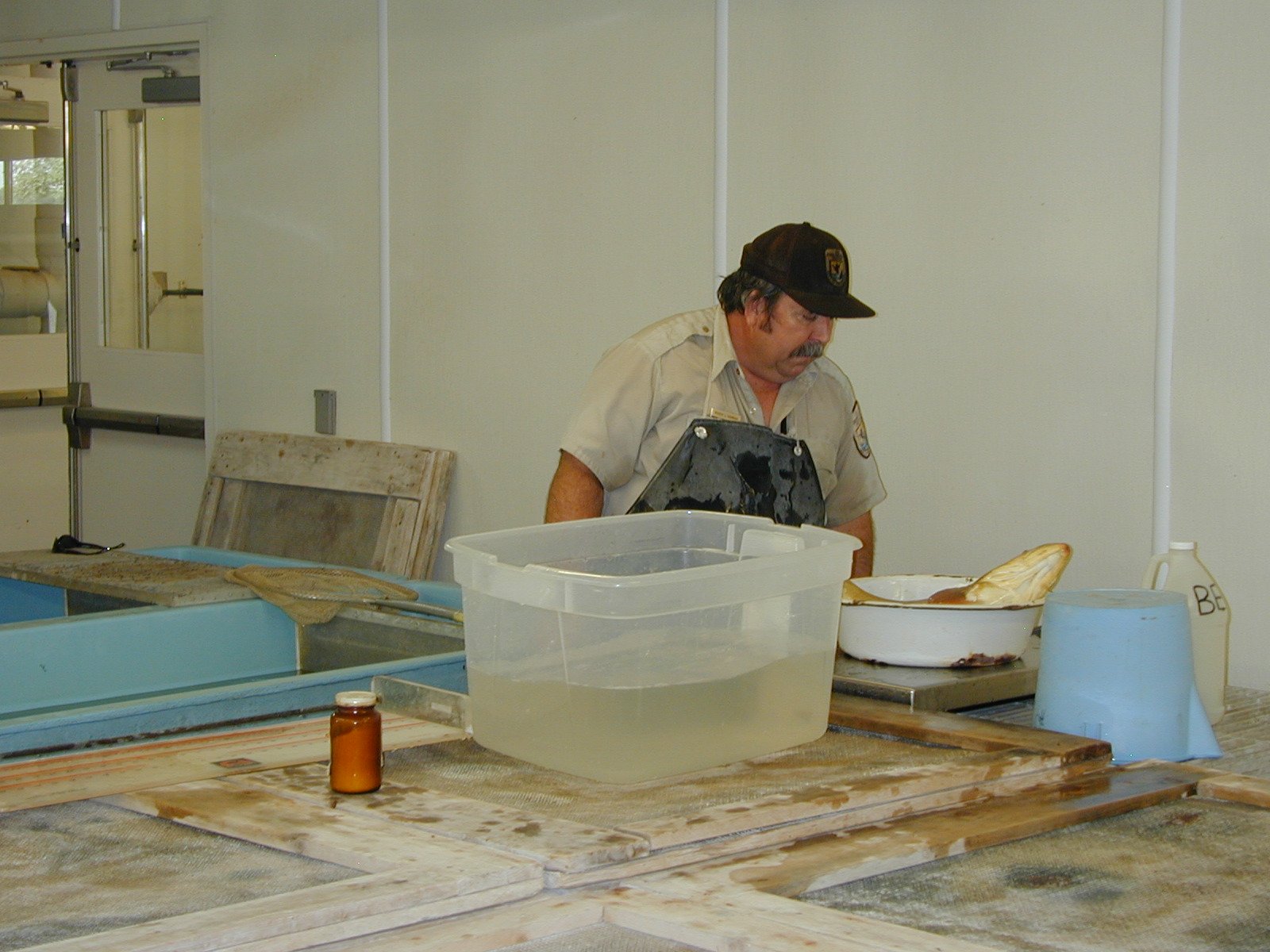
Recording length and weight before spawning Colorado pikeminnow

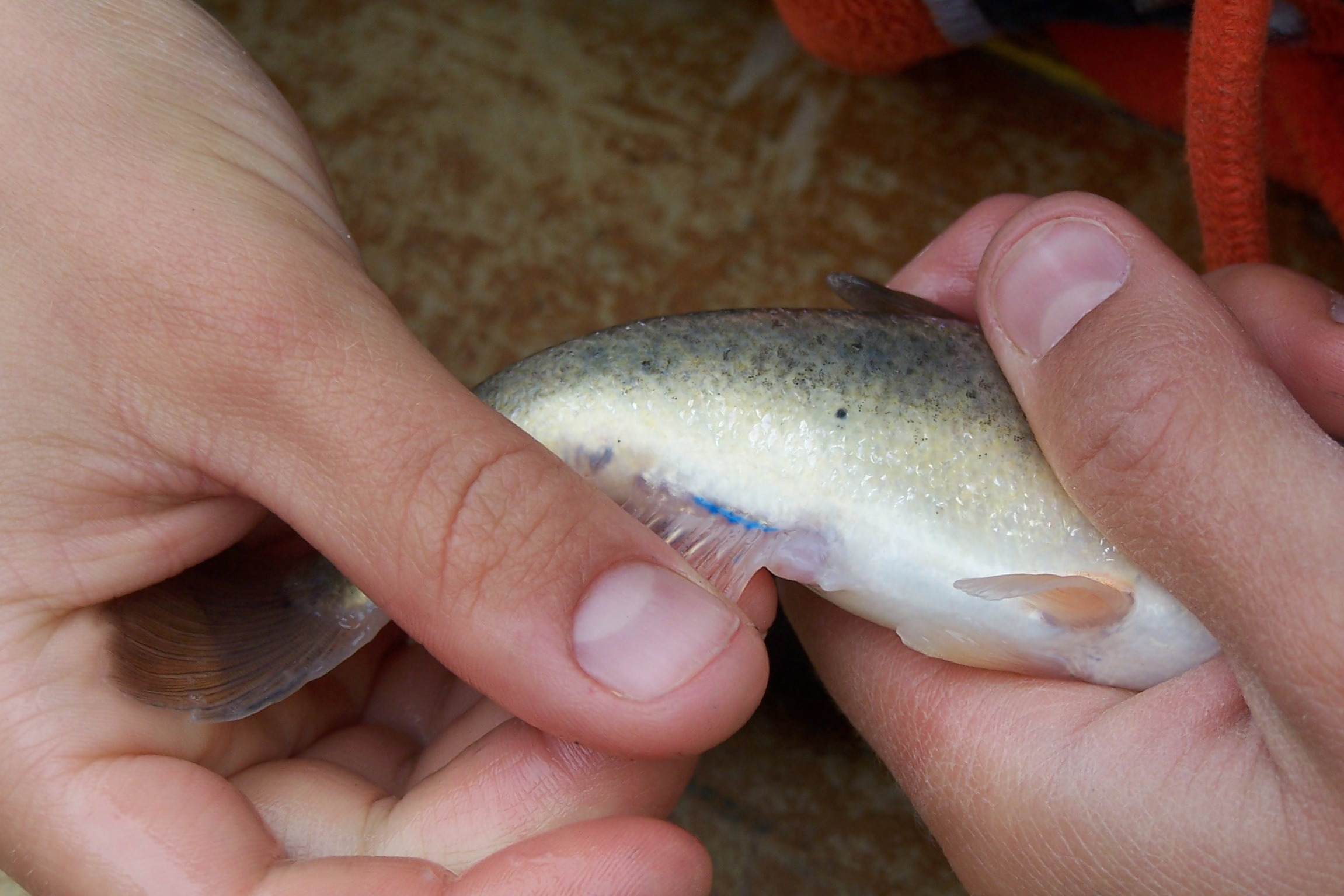
Visible implant elastomer inserted in the anal fin of a southern leatherside chub, Lepidomeda aliciae

Traditionally, the spawning season at center starts in March and ends in mid-June. The techniques the center employs are induced spawning and natural spawning; 17 different species on the endangered and threatened list are spawned at the center.

Broodfish from these species are purposely reared at the center for spawning. Each year, the center spawns over 350 pairs of the broodfish using the induced spawning method. These pairs produce over 3.5 million eggs, not including those that spawn naturally in the earthen ponds. Fish from each spawn are taken and held at the station for future broodstock, ensuring genetic diversity. Different pairs of each species are spawned each year, discouraging spawning of the same fish year after year.

The success the center has experienced in spawning is evident in its distribution of the species into their natural habitat. Without this type of intervention, the chances of these species becoming extinct is almost certain.

== Tagging/marking of fish ==
Currently, the center uses four different methods as identification tools. Biologists both in the field and on-site are able to identify fish that are reared at a facility versus those that are wild:

- Calcien marking: Immersion fluorescent markers adhere to the bony parts of the fish. The fins and cranium seem to be the most susceptible parts of the fish. When placed under blue light, the marked areas exhibit fluorescence.
- Visible implant elastomer: Colored fluorescent elastomer material is injected into tissue with a hypodermic syringe. The material then cures into a pliable, solid, well-defined mark, which fluoresces under blue light.
- Passive integrated transponder: Small microchips (about the size of a grain of rice) are injected with a hypodermic syringe and read with a hand-held scanner.
- Wire tagging: The Mark IV tagging device uses a small magnetic wire tag that is injected just below the surface skin in various locations on the fish. Tags are read using a hand-held wand detector.
