= Star Mountain (Colorado) =

Mountain in Colorado, United States

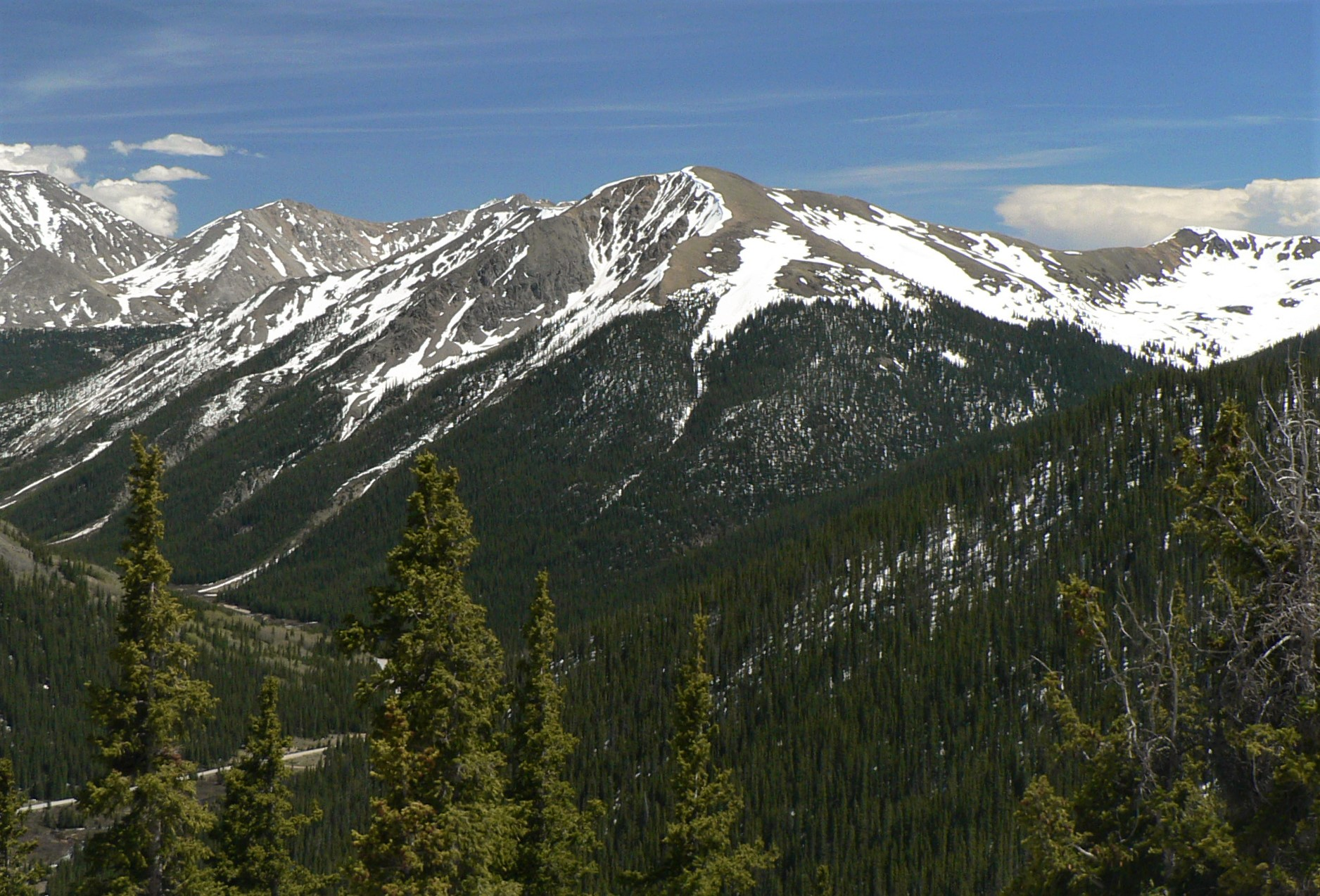
- Northwest aspect, from Independence Pass

Highest point
- Elevation: 12,941 ft (3,944 m)
- Prominence: 541 ft (165 m)
- Parent peak: Ouray Peak (12,963 ft)
- Isolation: 1.78 mi (2.86 km)
- Coordinates: 39°03′42″N 106°32′00″W

Geography
- Location within Colorado Location within the United States
- Country: United States
- State: Colorado
- County: Lake
- Protected area: Collegiate Peaks Wilderness
- Parent range: Rocky Mountains; Sawatch Range
- Topo map: USGS Independence Pass

Climbing
- Easiest route: class 2 hiking

Star Mountain is a 12,941-foot (3,944 m) mountain summit in Lake County, Colorado, United States.

== Description ==
Star Mountain is set 2.35 miles (3.78 km) east of the Continental Divide in the Sawatch Range which is a subrange of the Rocky Mountains. The mountain is located in the Collegiate Peaks Wilderness on land managed by San Isabel National Forest. Star Mountain can be seen from State Highway 82 at Independence Pass. Precipitation runoff from the mountain's slopes drains into Lake Creek which is a tributary of the Arkansas River. Topographic relief is significant as the summit rises 2,640 feet (805 m) above North Fork Lake Creek in one mile (1.6 km). The highest peak in Colorado, Mount Elbert, is 5.59 miles (9.00 km) to the northeast of Star. The mountain's toponym has been officially adopted by the United States Board on Geographic Names.

== Climate ==
According to the Köppen climate classification system, Star Mountain is located in an alpine subarctic climate zone with cold, snowy winters, and cool to warm summers. Due to its altitude, it receives precipitation all year, as snow in winter and as thunderstorms in summer, with a dry period in late spring.

== Gallery ==
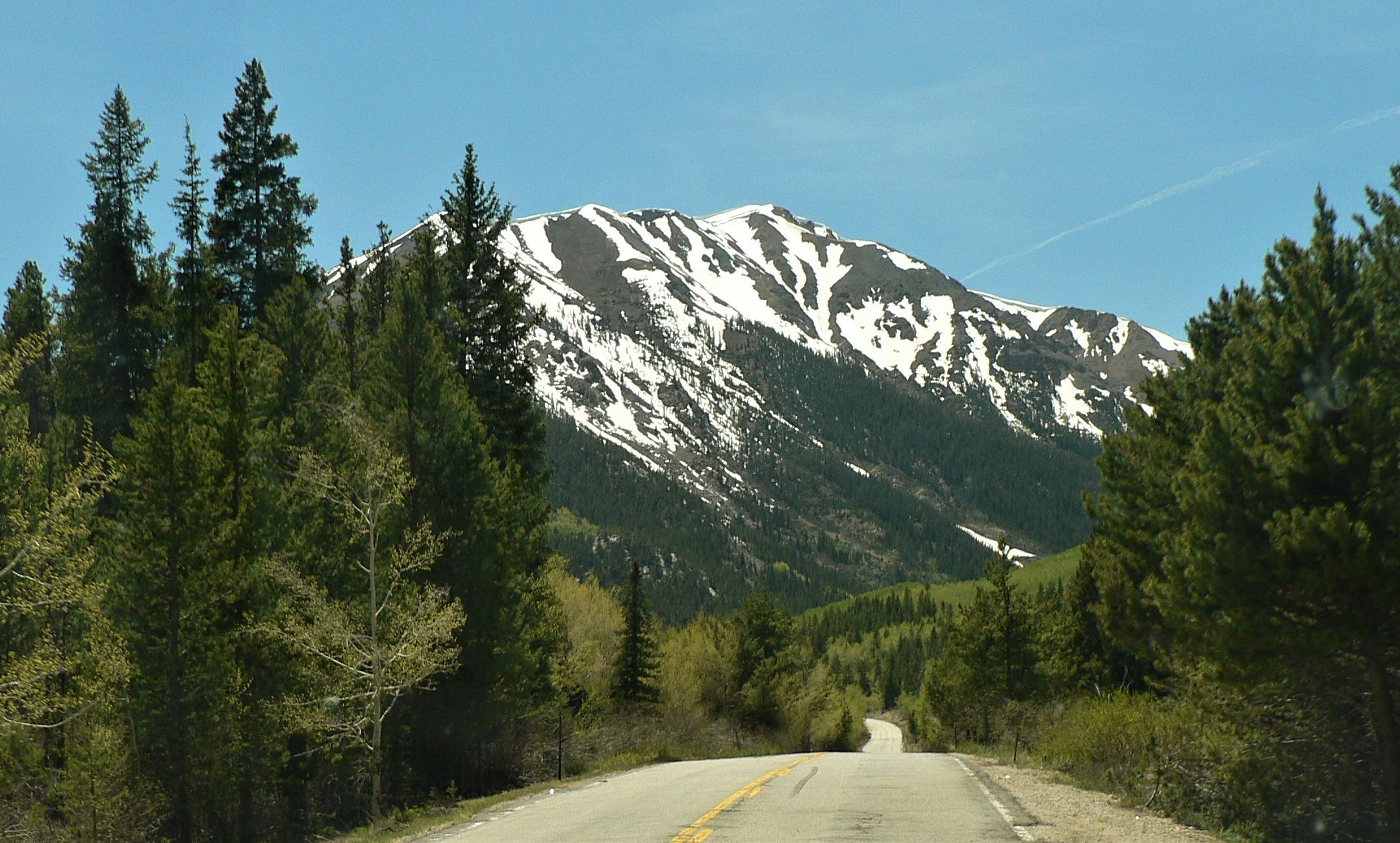
East aspect of Star Mountain, from Highway 82

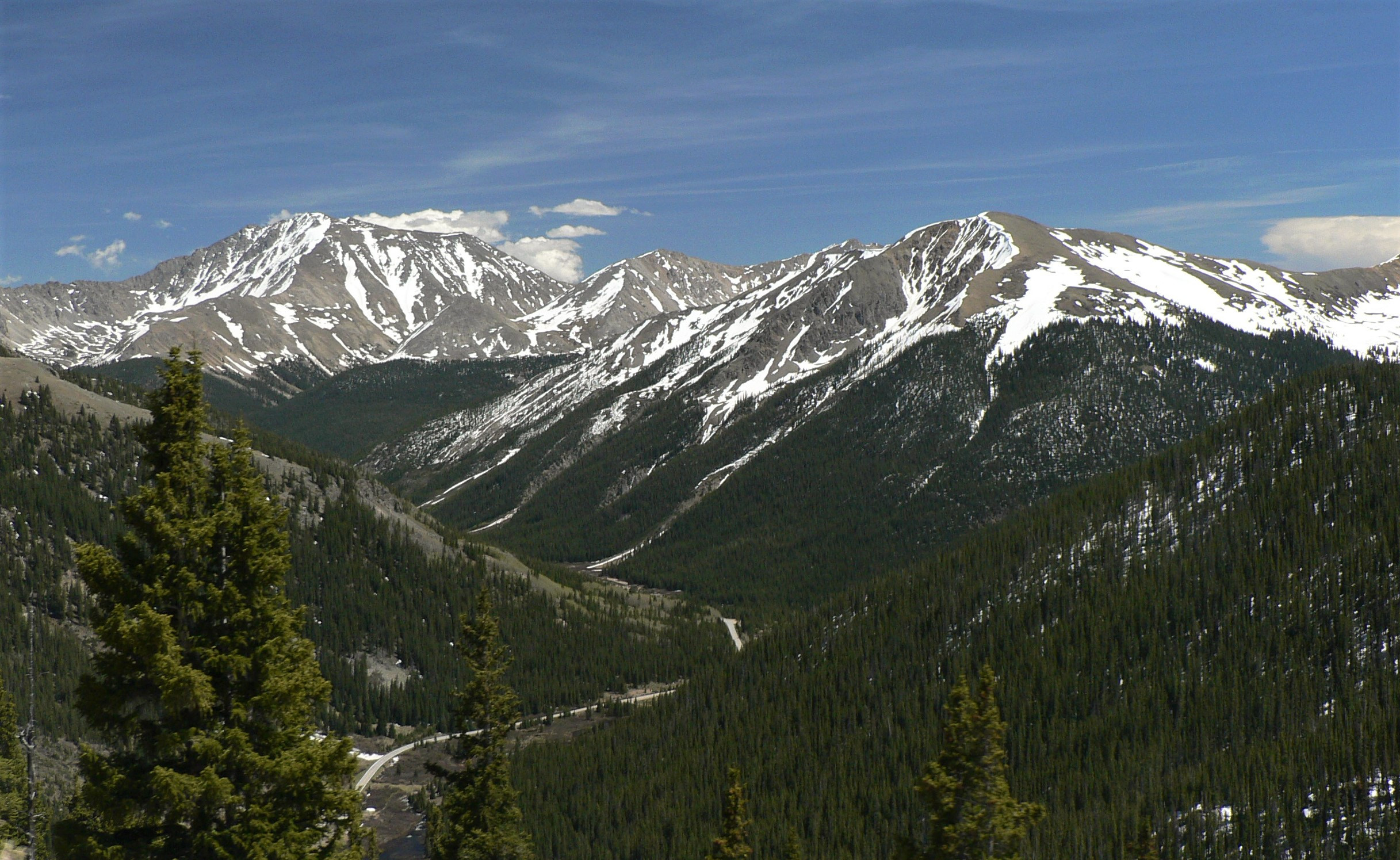
La Plata Peak (left) and Star Mountain (right) viewed from Independence Pass

== See also ==
- Mountains of Lake County, Colorado
