= Cottonwood Valley (Arizona and Nevada) =

Landform in Clark County, Nevada and Mohave County, Arizona, US

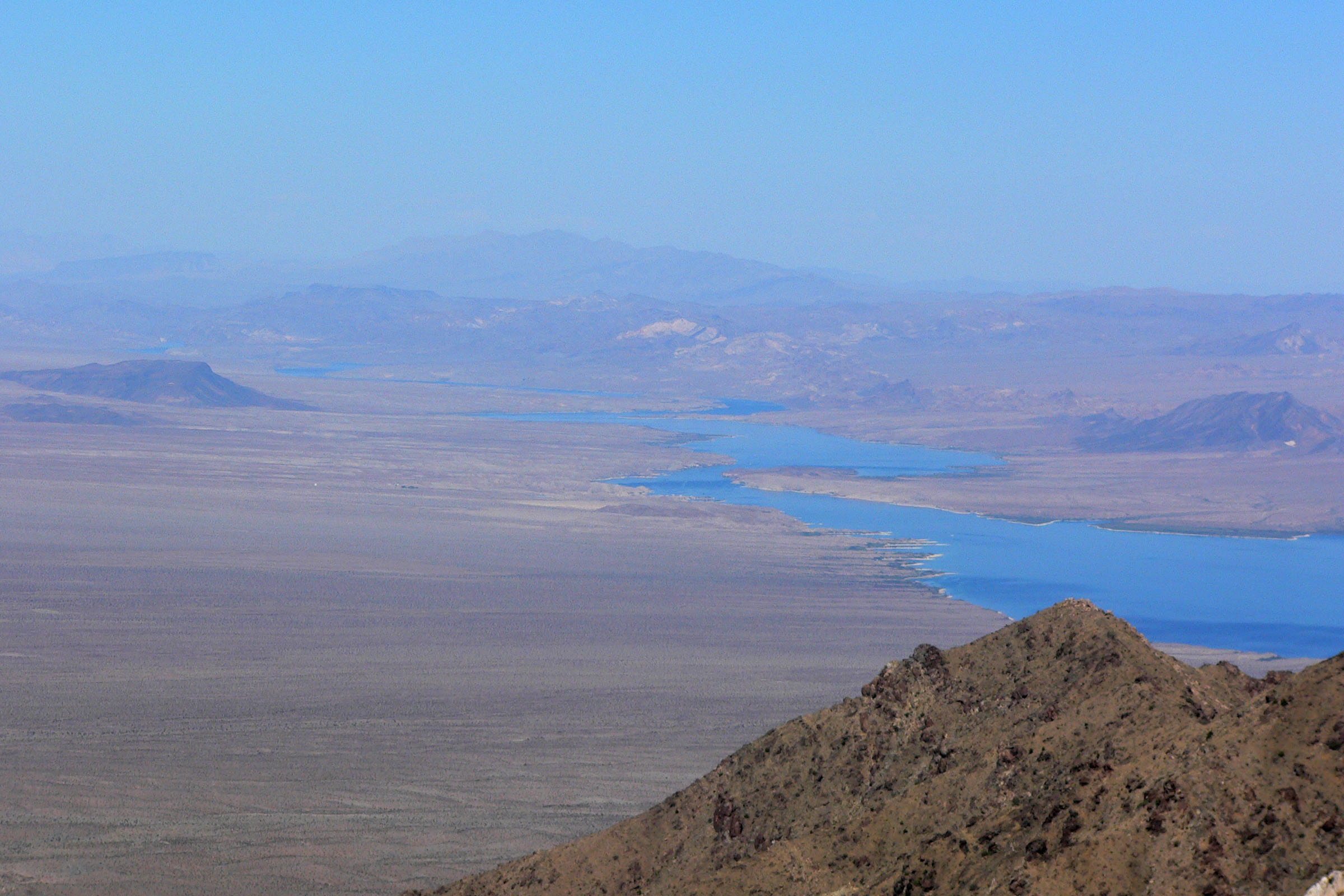
- View slightly east of true-north.

- Location within Arizona
- Length: 20 mi (32 km) N-S
- Width: 16 mi (26 km) E-W

Geography
- Country: United States
- States: Arizona; Nevada
- Regions: Mojave Desert; Lower Colorado River Valley
- County: Mohave; Clark
- Community: Cottonwood Cove
- Borders on: List: Black Canyon of the Colorado; Black Mountains (Arizona); Newberry Mountains (Nevada); Searchlight, NV; Eldorado Mountains
- Coordinates: 35°26′14″N 114°38′37″W
- River: Colorado River
- Lake: Lake Mohave
- Interactive map of Cottonwood Valley

Cottonwood Valley is a wide valley on the Colorado River on the border between Mohave County, Arizona and Clark County, Nevada. It extends east and west from the river into both states and is the first wide valley south of the Black Canyon of the Colorado, the last in a series of great canyons the Colorado River passes through after leaving the Rocky Mountains on its way west and where it makes its turn to the south toward the Gulf of California.

All of the Colorado River in Cottonwood Valley and the lower reach of the Black Canyon of the Colorado is now under Lake Mohave.

== See also ==
- List of valleys of the Lower Colorado River Valley
