= Ouray National Wildlife Refuge =

U.S. National Wildlife Refuge in Utah

- IUCN category IV (habitat/species management area)
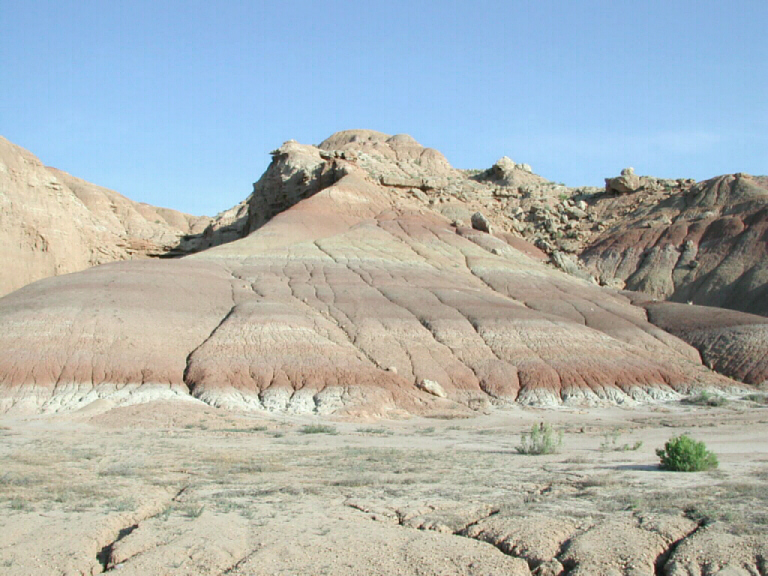

- Location within Utah Location within the United States
- Location: Uintah County, Utah, United States
- Nearest city: Ouray, Utah
- Coordinates: 40°09′N 109°37′W
- Area: 11,987 acres (48.51 km^{2})
- Established: 1960
- Governing body: U.S. Fish and Wildlife Service
- Website: www.fws.gov/refuge/ouray/

Ouray National Wildlife Refuge (also called Ouray National Waterfowl Refuge) is a wildlife refuge in central Uintah County, Utah, in the northeastern part of the state. It is part of the National Wildlife Refuge system, located two miles northeast of the village of Ouray, 10 miles (16 km) southeast of the town of Randlett, and 30 miles (50 km) southwest of Vernal.

Established in 1960, it straddles the Green River for 12 miles (19 km), and covers 11,987 acres (48.51 km^{2}). A portion of the refuge (3,800 acres [1,500 ha]) is leased from the Uintah and Ouray Indian Reservation. The refuge was created for the use of both local and migratory birds, and with funds provided by the sale of Federal Duck Stamps.

The site of the refuge also holds the Ouray National Fish Hatchery, which was established in 1996 to help hatch razorback suckers, humpback chubs, Colorado pikeminnows and Bonytail chubs.

Precipitation is less than 7 inches (180 mm) per annum.
