= Mount Ouray =

Mountain in Colorado, United States

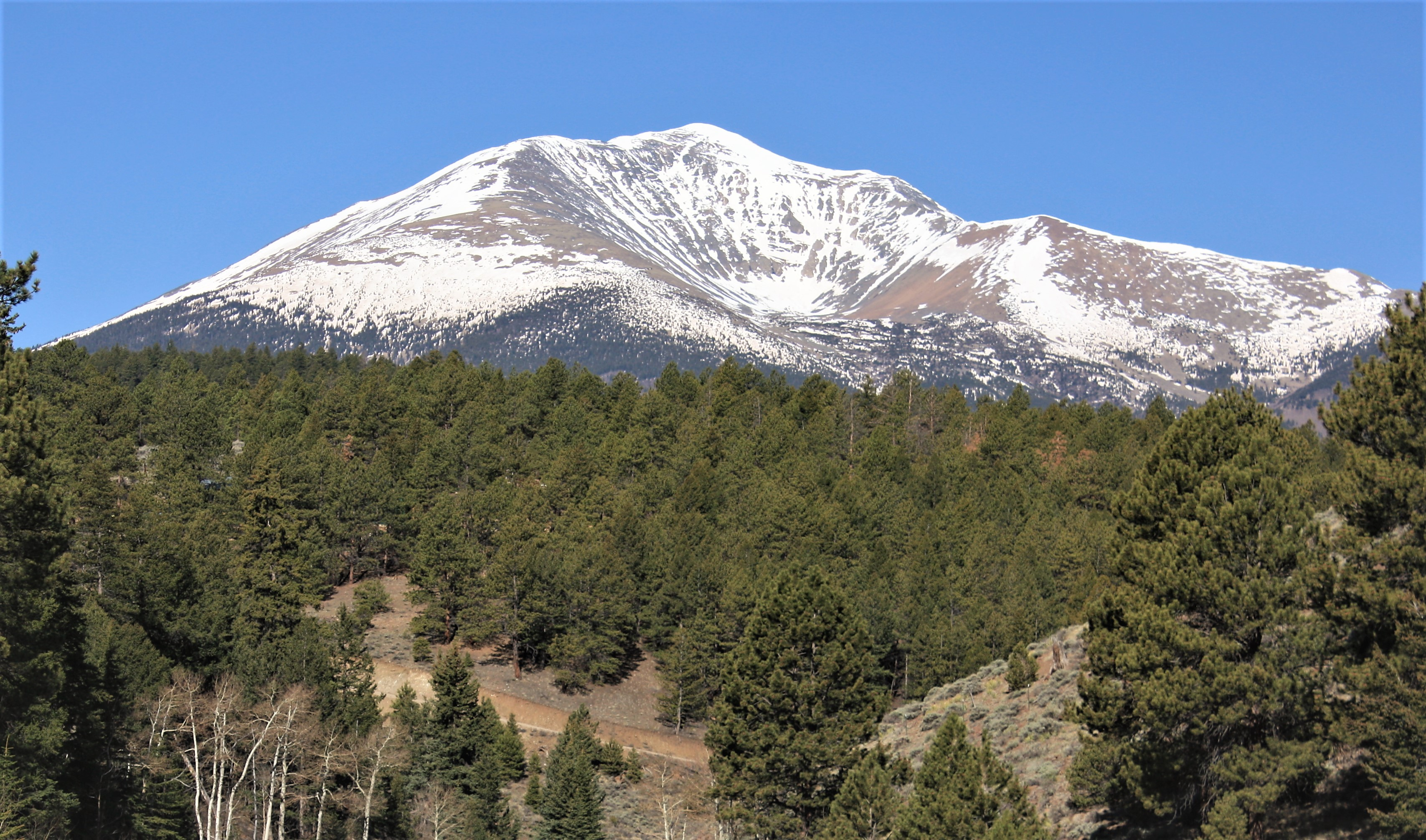
- East aspect

Highest point
- Elevation: 13,961 ft (4,255 m); NAVD88
- Prominence: 2659 ft (810 m)
- Isolation: 13.58 mi (21.9 km)
- Listing: North America highest peaks 65th; US highest major peaks 49th; Colorado highest major peaks 27th
- Coordinates: 38°25′22″N 106°13′29″W

Geography
- Location within Colorado
- Location: Chaffee and Saguache counties, Colorado, United States
- Parent range: Sawatch Mountains
- Topo map(s): USGS 7.5' topographic map Mount Ouray, Colorado

Climbing
- Easiest route: West ridge, class 2

Mount Ouray is a high and prominent mountain summit in the far southern Sawatch Range of the Rocky Mountains of North America. The 13,961-foot (4255.4 m) thirteener is located in San Isabel National Forest, 7.5 miles (12.0 km) west (bearing 270°) of Poncha Pass, Colorado, United States, on the boundary between Chaffee and Saguache counties. The mountain was named in honor of Ute Chief Ouray.

== Mountain ==
Mount Ouray makes up the southern tip of Sawatch Mountains, rising 7,000 feet above the Arkansas River Valley. Monarch Pass is four miles northwest of the peak.

The mountain is named after the Ute Chief Ouray. Nearby Chipeta Mountain, just over a mile to the northwest of Mount Ouray, is named after Chief Ouray's wife.

== Routes ==
The standard route is the west ridge. Starting at Marshall Pass, the route heads north along the Continental Divide until the west ridge of Mount Ouray is reached. From there, one can hike east along this ridge up to the summit.

== Climate ==
According to the Köppen climate classification system, Mount Ouray is located in an alpine subarctic climate zone with long, cold, snowy winters, and cool to warm summers. Due to its altitude, it receives precipitation all year, as snow in winter and as thunderstorms in summer, with a dry period in late spring.

Climate data for Mount Ouray 38.4227 N, 106.2250 W, Elevation: 13,337 ft (4,065 m) (1991–2020 normals)
Month	Jan	Feb	Mar	Apr	May	Jun	Jul	Aug	Sep	Oct	Nov	Dec	Year
Mean daily maximum °F (°C)	23.2 (−4.9)	23.1 (−4.9)	28.4 (−2.0)	33.8 (1.0)	42.4 (5.8)	54.3 (12.4)	59.4 (15.2)	57.0 (13.9)	50.9 (10.5)	40.8 (4.9)	30.3 (−0.9)	23.6 (−4.7)	38.9 (3.9)
Daily mean °F (°C)	11.9 (−11.2)	11.4 (−11.4)	16.1 (−8.8)	21.0 (−6.1)	29.7 (−1.3)	40.3 (4.6)	45.5 (7.5)	43.9 (6.6)	38.0 (3.3)	28.6 (−1.9)	19.3 (−7.1)	12.5 (−10.8)	26.5 (−3.0)
Mean daily minimum °F (°C)	0.6 (−17.4)	−0.2 (−17.9)	3.7 (−15.7)	8.3 (−13.2)	17.0 (−8.3)	26.3 (−3.2)	31.7 (−0.2)	30.8 (−0.7)	25.0 (−3.9)	16.3 (−8.7)	8.2 (−13.2)	1.5 (−16.9)	14.1 (−9.9)
Average precipitation inches (mm)	2.70 (69)	2.75 (70)	2.90 (74)	3.39 (86)	2.48 (63)	1.19 (30)	2.51 (64)	2.84 (72)	2.26 (57)	1.99 (51)	2.43 (62)	2.48 (63)	29.92 (761)
Source: PRISM Climate Group

== Gallery ==
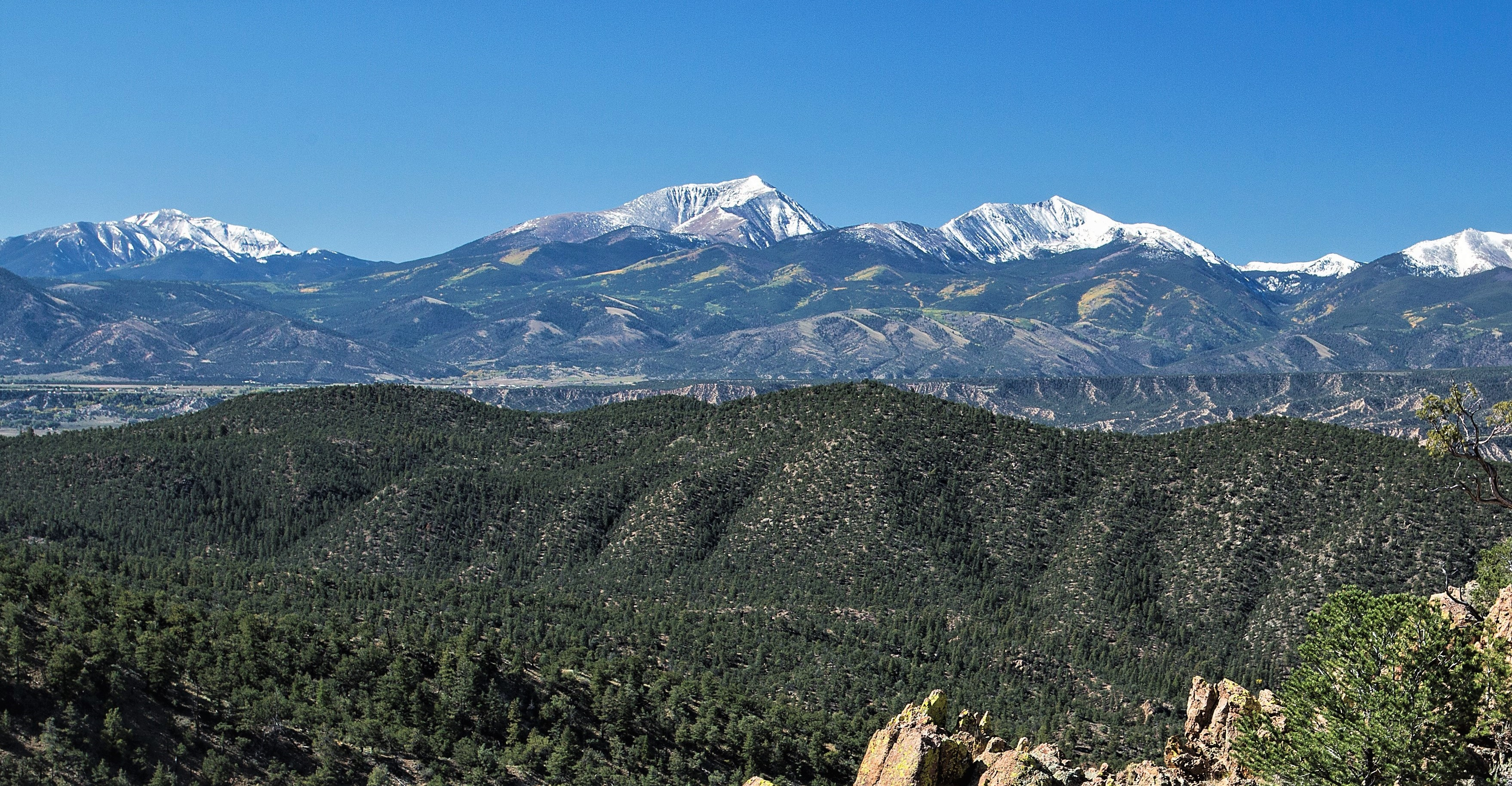
Mt. Ouray centered on skyline

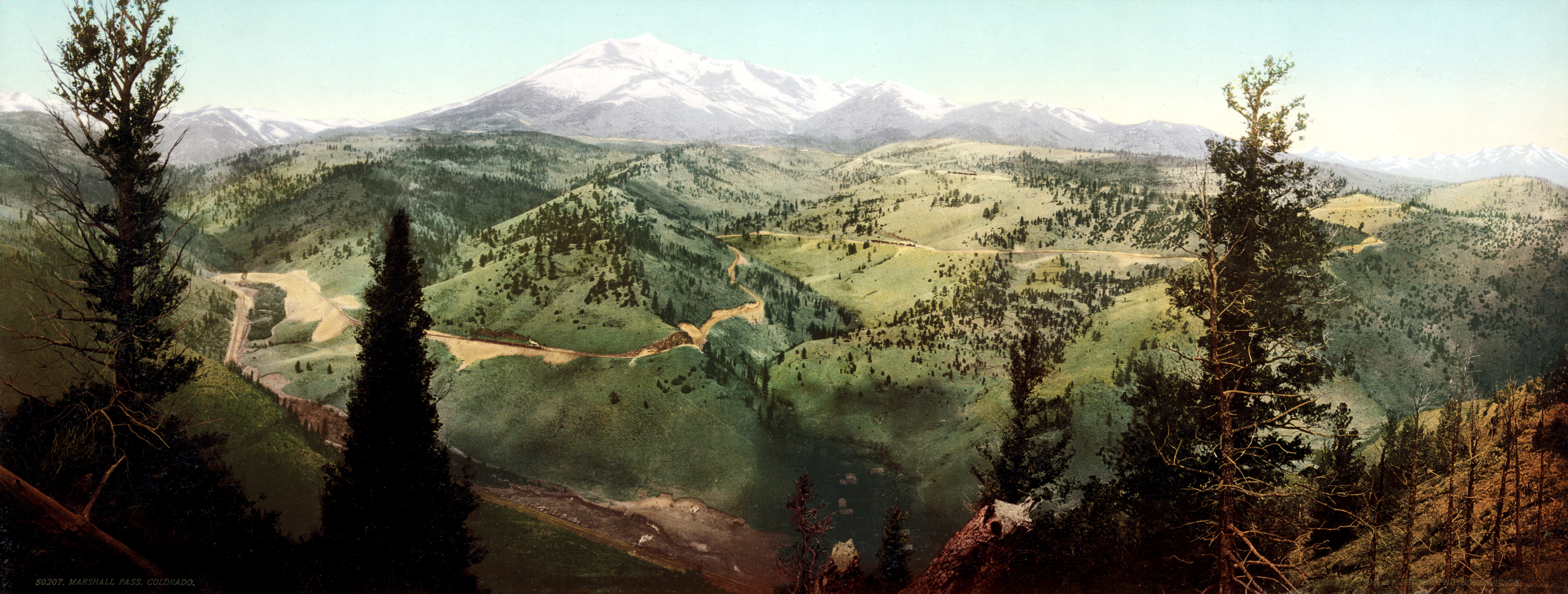
Mount Ouray above Marshall Pass in 1899.

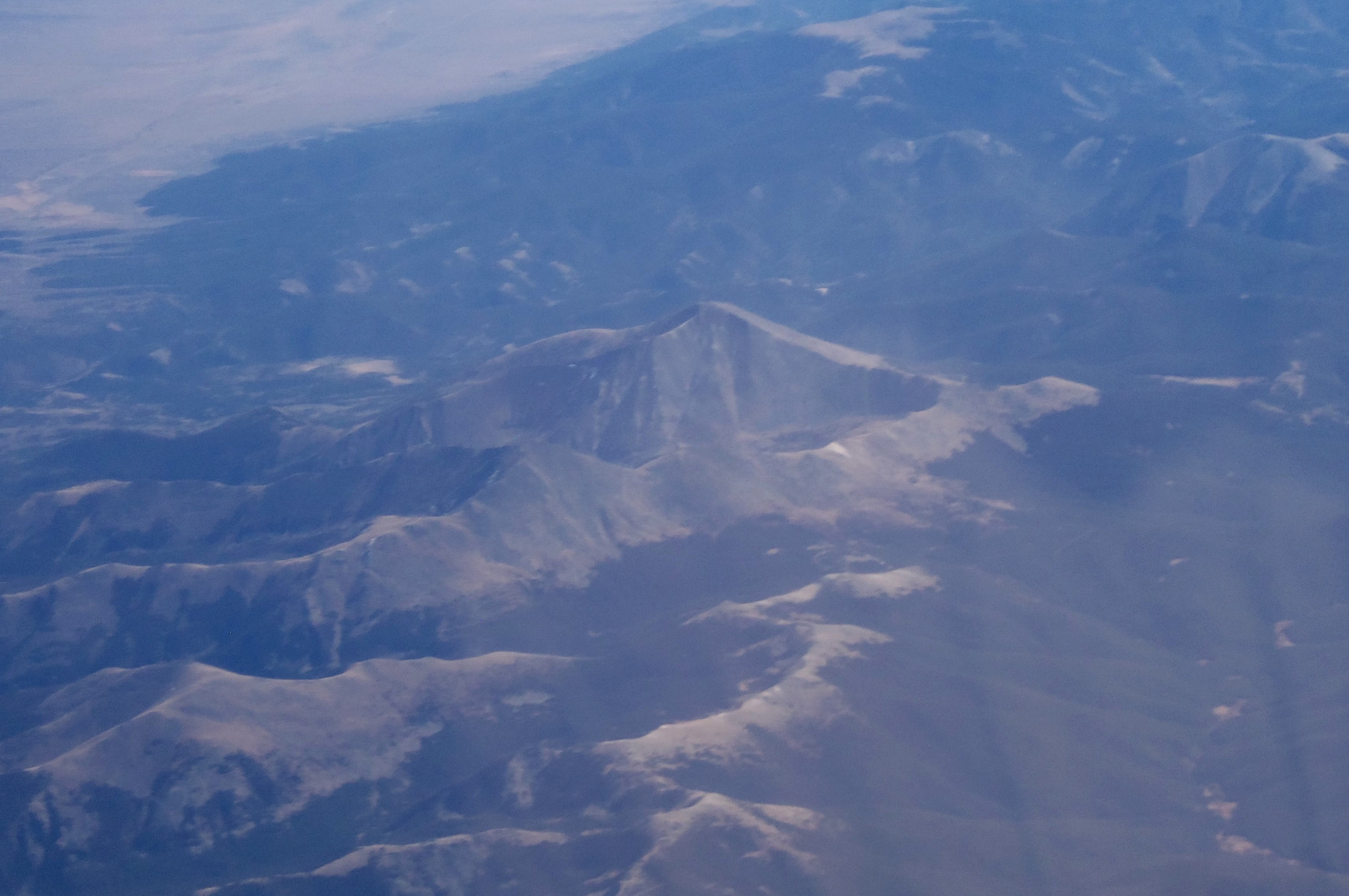
Aerial photo of Mount Ouray in 2020

== Historical names ==
- Hump Mountain
- Mount Ouray – 1962
- Ouray Mountain
- Ouray Peak – 1906 (there is a different Ouray Peak in northern Chaffee County)

== See also ==
- List of mountain peaks of North America
  - List of mountain peaks of the United States
    - List of mountain peaks of Colorado
