= List of valleys of the Lower Colorado River Valley =

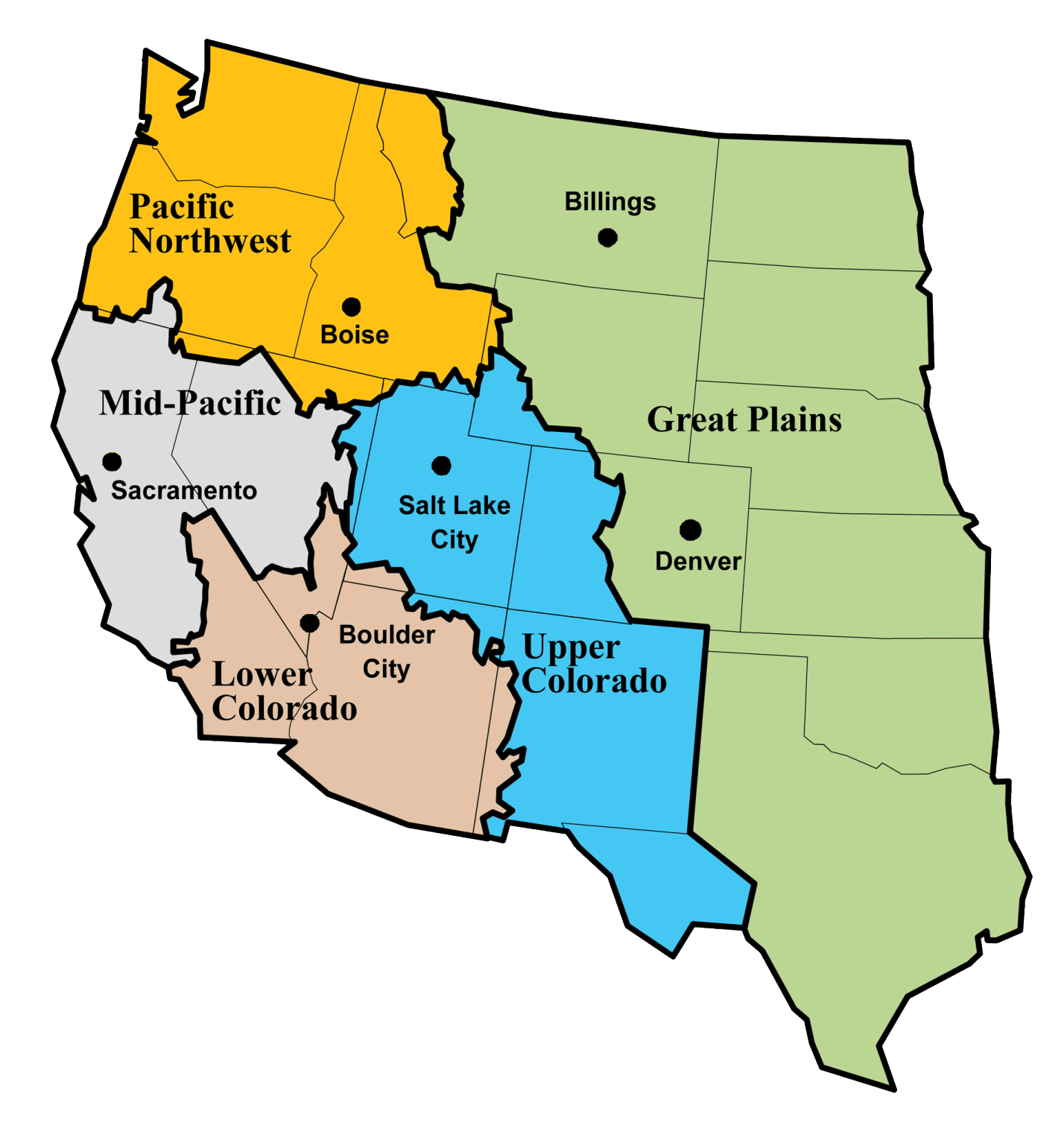
Bureau of Reclamation regions

This is a list of valleys within the Lower Colorado River Valley corridor, from the Hoover Dam (Lake Mead) region, south to the Mexico border.

Six valleys are contained within neighboring bajadas and mountain ranges, on the Colorado River proper; other tributary valleys flow during desert rain episodes, and are otherwise dry washes. Only higher elevation associated mountains may have longer sustained pools of water in dry wash riverbeds.

== Colorado River valleys ==
- Cottonwood Valley (Arizona/Nevada)
- Mohave Valley
- Parker Valley
- Palo Verde Valley
- Cibola Valley
- Gila Valley (Yuma County)

== Tributary valleys to the Colorado River watershed ==
(listed north-to-south, the path of the Colorado River)

- Nevada
  - Eldorado Valley-(endorheic)
  - Piute Valley
- California
  - Piute Valley & Wash
- Chemehuevi Valley & Wash
- Whipple Mountains
- Vidal Valley & Wash
- Rice Valley & "Big Wash"
- "McCoy Wash"
- Chocolate Mountains
- Winterhaven, California
- Mexico
- Arizona
  - ----Black Mountains (Arizona)
- Sacramento Valley
- Bill Williams River
- Bouse Wash & La Posa Plain
- Gila River
- Yuma, Arizona
