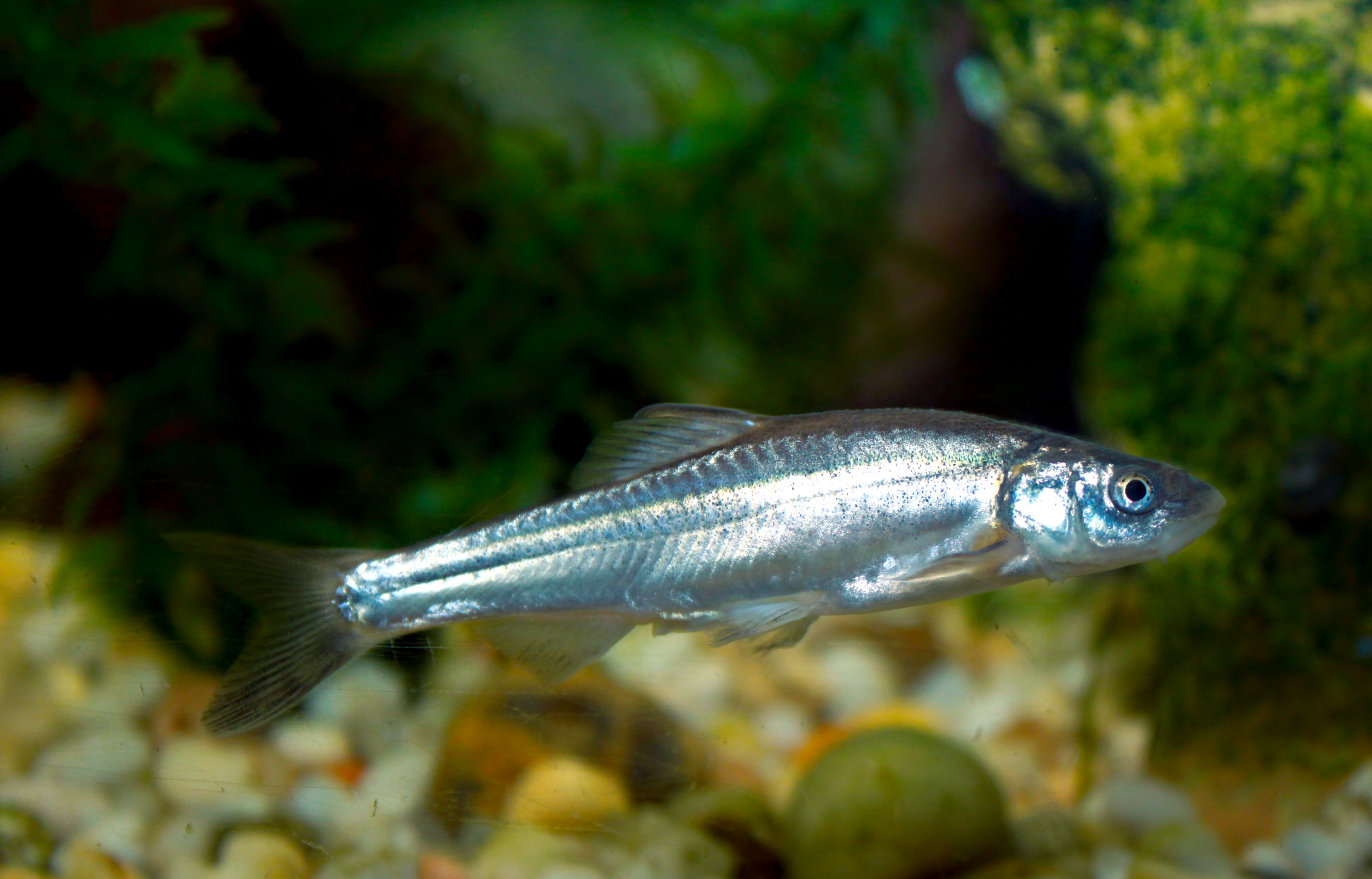

Conservation status
- Critically Endangered (IUCN 3.1)

- Critically Imperiled (NatureServe)

Scientific classification
- Kingdom: Animalia
- Phylum: Chordata
- Class: Actinopterygii
- Division: Teleostei
- Order: Cypriniformes
- Family: Leuciscidae
- Subfamily: Plagopterinae
- Genus: Plagopterus; Cope, 1874
- Species: P. argentissimus

Binomial name
- Plagopterus argentissimus Cope, 1874

= Woundfin =

Species of fish

The woundfin (Plagopterus argentissimus) ray-finned fish in the family Leuciscidae. This fish is endemic to the Virgin River of the southwestern United States. It is the only species in the monotypic genus Plagopterus.

== Description ==
The woundfin is a small slender, silvery minnow, with a flattened head and belly, long snout, leathery skin, and no scales. There are barbels on the corners of its lips, and its common name likely comes from the first spinous ray of its dorsal fin, which is sharp-pointed. Its maximum length is rarely more than 7.5 cm (3.0 in). It can be distinguished from spikedace and spinedace by presence of barbels.

== Distribution ==
Historically, the woundfin occupied much of the lower Colorado River basin, including two tributaries, the Virgin River and part of the Gila River; however, habitat destruction through dams and water development has led to its extirpation from these regions. In addition, several introduced species, most notably the red shiner (Cyprinella lutrensis) have contributed to a decrease in the woundfin's Virgin River population. The woundfin is currently federally listed as an endangered species, while the United States Fish and Wildlife Service lists the population status as "declining."

== Habitat ==
The woundfin tolerates highly mineralized, turbid waters. It is typically found in warm, swift streams of high turbidity, preferring a stream speed of one to two feet per second and a depth of eight to eighteen inches.

== Food ==
The woundfin is omnivorous, and depending on availability will feed on detritus, algae, seeds, and aquatic insects and their larvae.

== Conservation status ==
Historically, the woundfin also occupied the lower Colorado River from the Virgin to Yuma, Arizona, and the Gila River from Yuma to its confluence with the Salt River, but habitat destruction through water development (including eight major dams which alter flow) and the introduction of several species (particularly the red shiner (Cyprinella lutrensis), which competes for food and is known to prey upon the woundfin's eggs and young) have led to its extirpation in these regions as well as a decline in population in the Virgin River. Since 1970, the woundfin has been listed as an endangered species. Other listings include "Vulnerable" on the IUCN Red List and "Critically Imperiled" (the most critical classification) by NatureServe. The United States Fish and Wildlife Service lists the population status as "declining." The Dexter National Fish Hatchery in Dexter, New Mexico studies the woundfin in an effort to help conserve the species, and has successfully spawned the fish in captivity. However, efforts to transplant the species into other rivers and creeks have failed due to reproduction not taking place. On July 11, 2007, approximately 50 woundfin were released into the Hassayampa River near Wickenburg, Arizona. The hatchery-raised fish were from wild Virgin River stock. The only wild population of the species is in the Virgin River. An aggressive program to eradicate red shiner from the Virgin River in Utah has all but removed red shiner from reaches previously dominated by red shiner. Fish barriers have been erected to prevent re-colonization by red shiner, and has allowed the reintroduction of hatchery raised woundfin. Several thousand of hatchery-raised woundfin were released in the fall of 2007 and 2008. With red shiner no longer a threat, low flows and high temperatures are the biggest threats still facing woundfin. Another minnow, the Virgin River chub (Gila seminuda), has much of the same range as the woundfin and thus faces the same threats of extinction, particularly competition from the red shiner and a decrease in water quality as the result of agricultural runoff.
