= Cottonwood Cove, Nevada =

Unincorporated community located in the State of Nevada, United States of America

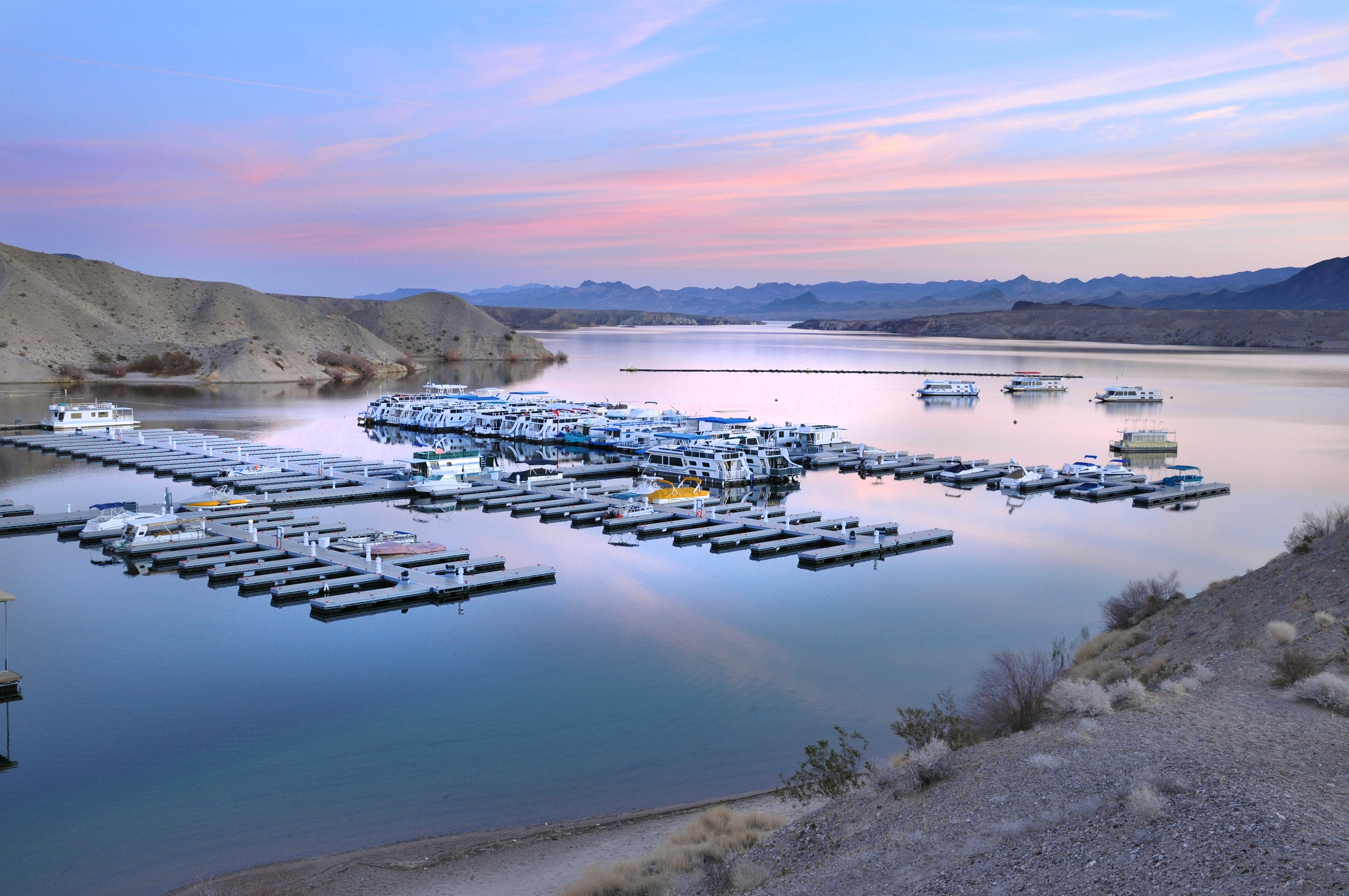
- Cottonwood Cove on Lake Mohave

- Location within Nevada
- Coordinates: 35°30′2.04″N 114°43′5.27″W
- Max. length: 67 miles (108 km)

Cottonwood Cove is situated at the banks of Lake Mohave on the Nevada-Arizona border in Clark County, Nevada, United States. It stands just 13.1 miles (21 kilometers) and 23 minutes east of Searchlight, 12.5 miles (20 kilometers) north of Laughlin and an hour away from Las Vegas. It is the site of the Cottonwood Cove Resort and Marina. The cove is part of the Lake Mead National Recreation Area administered by the U.S. National Park Service. The desert lake is approximately 67 miles long and is backed by the Davis Dam on the Colorado River.

== Fish species ==
- Rainbow
- Largemouth Bass
- Striped Bass
- Crappie
- Sunfish
- Catfish (Channel)
- Carp

== In popular culture ==
Cottonwood Cove appears as a significant location in the 2010 video game Fallout: New Vegas, where it is depicted as a Caesar's Legion-affiliated camp, in which slave trading occurs.
