= Chipeta Mountain =

Mountain in Colorado, United States

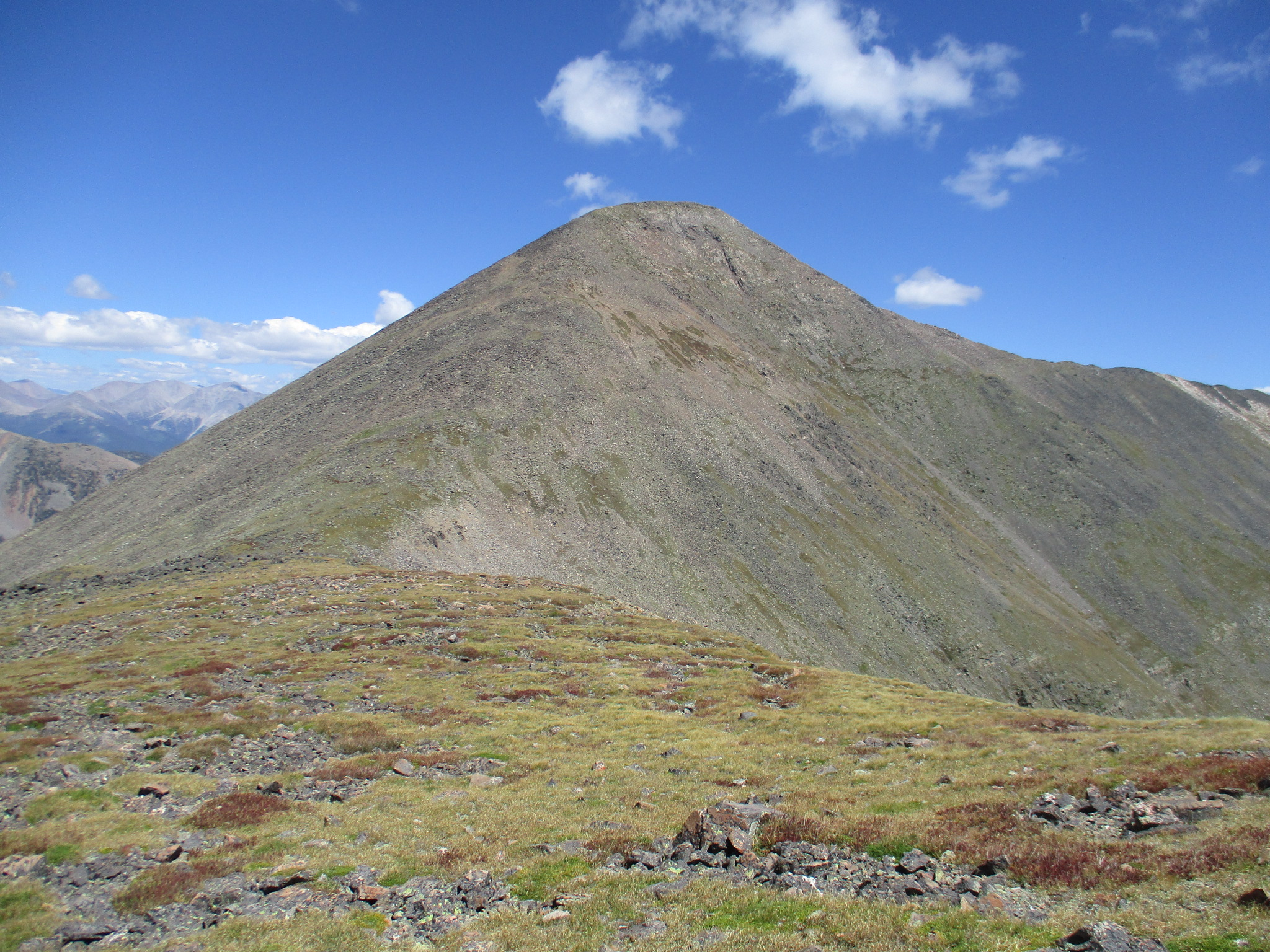
- Chipeta Mountain viewed from the southwest.

Highest point
- Elevation: 13,495 ft (4,113 m)
- Prominence: 1,200 ft (370 m)
- Isolation: 1.92 mi (3.09 km)
- Coordinates: 38°26′52″N 106°14′27″W

Geography
- Location within Colorado
- Location: Chaffee County, Colorado, US
- Parent range: Sawatch Range
- Topo map(s): USGS 7.5' topographic map Mount Ouray

Climbing
- Easiest route: class 2

Chipeta Mountain is a mountain summit in the Sawatch Range of the Rocky Mountains of North America. The 13,495-foot (4,113 m) mountain is located in Chaffee County, Colorado, and in the San Isabel National Forest.

The mountain is named after Chipeta, a Native American leader known for her courageous efforts to mediate between Native Americans and European settlers. Nearby Mount Ouray, just 1.9 miles (3.1 km) southeast of Chipeta Mountain, is named after Chipeta's husband, Chief Ouray.

== Geology ==
Chipeta Mountain is dominated by Paleoproterozoic gneisses. These dark rocks were subsequently intruded by magma, and lighter-colored igneous intrusions are visible on the ridges extending below the peak. The building of the Ancestral Rocky Mountains during the Paleozoic and the Laramide Orogeny and the formation of the current Rocky Mountains 80 and 55 million years ago lifted these ancient basement rocks to lofty heights. Erosion has removed the overlying sedimentary and volcanic rocks.

Along the northeast flank of Chipeta Mountain are normal faults associated with the Rio Grande Rift. This rifting has resulted in extreme elevation gradients along the eastern side of the Sawatch Range. Chipeta Mountain looms over 6,000 feet (1,829 m) above the graben below.

Chipeta Mountain was glaciated, and the most prominent glacial cirques are located on the northeast and southeast sides of the mountain where tarns and glacial deposits are found.

== Climate ==
Chipeta Mountain's climate is classified as a tundra climate (ET) in the Köppen system and more specifically as an alpine climate, with cold, snowy winters and cool summers. It receives precipitation as snow in winter and as thunderstorms in summer, with June typically being a drier month.

== Hiking ==
Hiking to the summit of Chipeta Mountain is typically done during the summer and early fall when snow is free of the roads used to reach the trailheads. The easiest route to the summit starts at the Marshall Pass Trailhead located on the Continental Divide south of the mountain. A hike along the Monarch Crest Trail and then Forest Trail 484 leads to the southwest ridge of the mountain. From there, an off-trail, class 2 ridge hike leads northeast to the summit. This 4.75-mile (7.64 km) route has an elevation gain of 2,860 feet (872 m).

Chipeta Mountain can also be reached from four-wheel-drive roads and trails to the east. One route begins at the end of Little Cochetopa Road (Forest Road 710). Forest Trail 1409 leads west to the southwest ridge of the mountain, which can then be hiked to the summit. This 5.6-mile (9.0 km) route has an elevation gain of 3,490 feet (1,064 m).

== 2017 name change ==
The earliest United States Geological Survey topographic maps of the region were the Montrose, Colorado 1:250,000 scale maps first published in 1956. These maps show the name Chipeta Mountain applied to the highest point of the mountain at an elevation of 13,472 feet (4,106 m). Revisions of this map published through 1968 continued to label the high point as Chipeta Mountain. For unknown reasons, larger-scale maps of the region later published showed differently. The Bonanza, Colorado 1:62,500 scale maps first published in 1959 and the Mount Ouray, CO 1:24,000 scale maps first published in 1980 assigned the name Chipeta Mountain to a lower rise (elevation 12,850 feet (3,917 m)) on the southwest ridge of the mountain.

In 1963 the United States Board on Geographic Names (USBGN) accepted the name Chipeta Mountain and assigned it to this lower sub-peak. For over 50 years, the mountain's true summit remained officially unnamed. In 2017, the USBGN approved a citizen proposal to restore the name Chipeta Mountain to the mountain's high point.

== Historical names ==
- Chapita Mountain
- Chipeta Mountain
- Sabeta Peak
