= Lake Mohave =

Reservoir on the Colorado River

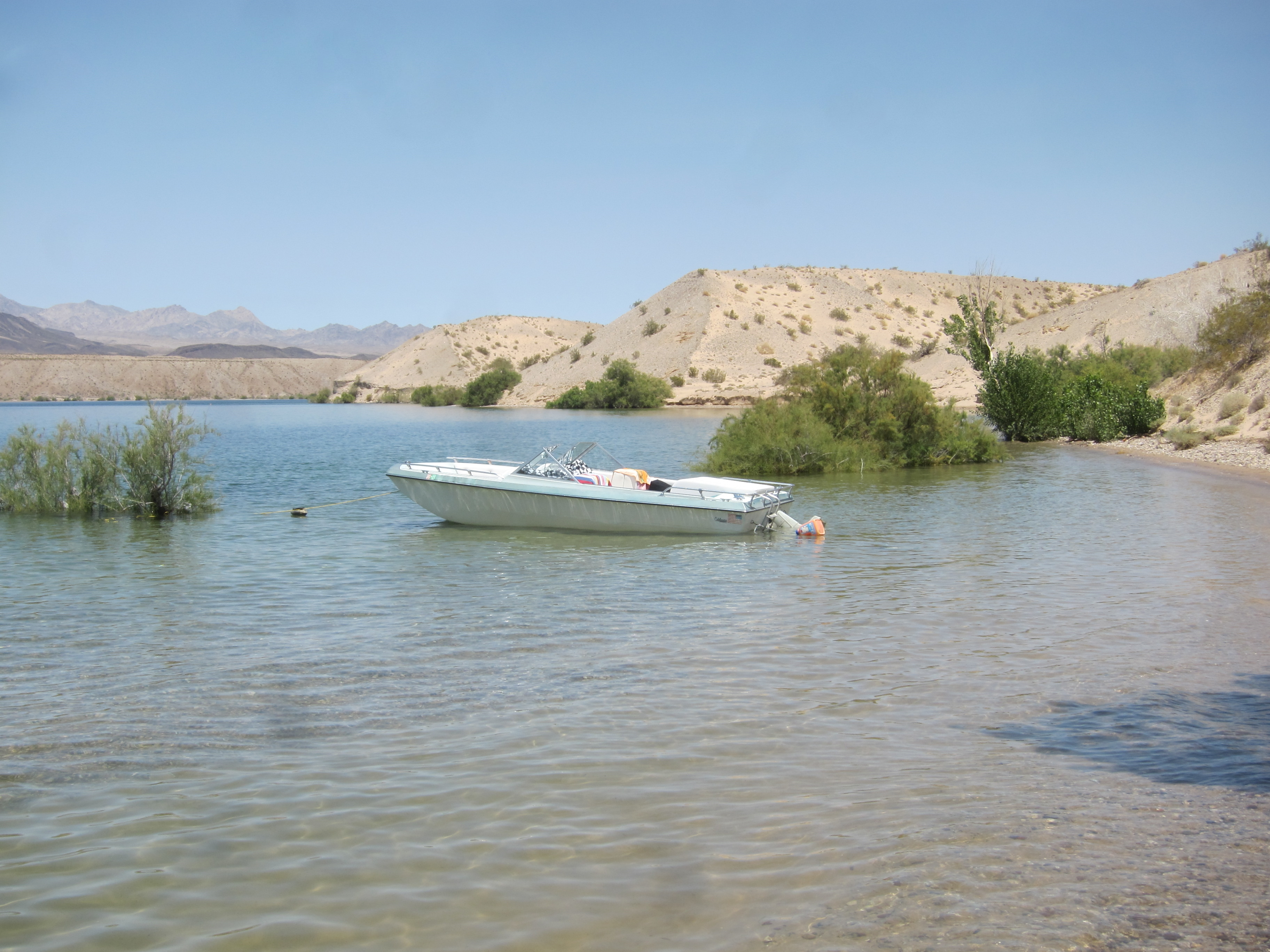
- Lake Mohave across from Cottonwood Cove

- Location within Nevada Location within the United States
- Location: Mohave County, Arizona / Clark County, Nevada, US
- Coordinates: 35°26′14″N 114°38′37″W
- Type: reservoir
- Basin countries: United States
- Managing agency: National Park Service
- Surface area: 26,500 acres (10,700 ha)
- Average depth: 140 ft (43 m)
- Water volume: 1,800,000 acre-feet (2,200×10^{6} m^{3})
- Surface elevation: 647 ft (197 m)

Lake Mohave is a reservoir on the Colorado River between the Hoover Dam and Davis Dam in Cottonwood Valley defining the border between Nevada and Arizona in the United States. This 67-mile (108 km) stretch of the Colorado River flows past Boulder City, Nelson, Searchlight, Cottonwood Cove, Cal-Nev-Ari, and Laughlin to the west in Nevada and Willow Beach and Bullhead City to the east in Arizona. A maximum width of 4 miles (6.4 km) wide and an elevation of 647 feet (197 m), Lake Mohave encompasses 28,260 acres (114.4 km^{2}) of water. As Lake Mead lies to the north of the Hoover Dam, Lake Mohave and adjacent lands forming its shoreline are part of the Lake Mead National Recreation Area administered by the U.S. National Park Service.

== Resorts and recreation ==
There are three resorts on Lake Mohave: Katherine Landing and Willow Beach in Arizona and Cottonwood Cove in Nevada. The Katherine Landing and Cottonwood Cove resorts offer lodging, RV parks with utility hook-ups, campgrounds, a restaurant, a store, launch ramps, and marinas with gas docks.

Popular recreational activities in Lake Mohave are swimming, kayaking, fishing, boating, and skiing. There are numerous boat and personal watercraft rental options as well as kayaking, scuba diving, and fishing supplies in Bullhead City, which borders the southernmost point of Lake Mohave. Bullhead City, Arizona, and Laughlin, Nevada, adjoin the National Recreation Area and offer a wide variety of lodging, dining and shopping options to visitors headed to Lake Mohave's largest and busiest marina, Katherine Landing.

Lake Mohave offers year-round recreational opportunities with water temperatures warm enough for swimming all year long. Its clear water caters to boaters, swimmers, and fishermen while its desert rewards hikers, wildlife photographers, and roadside sightseers. It is also home to thousands of desert plants and animals, adapted to survive in an extreme place where rain is scarce and temperatures soar. Several mapped hiking trails offer options for hikers of all skill levels. The shoreline of Lake Mohave is designated as the Mohave National Water Trail.

=== Scuba diving ===
Lake Mead National Recreation Area, which encompasses Lake Mead, Lake Mohave and portions of the Colorado River in the lower Grand Canyon to the north and below Davis Dam to the south, offers good diving opportunities for both novice and advanced divers. At Lake Mohave, divers can explore Black Canyon, which has excellent diving conditions. Advanced divers can check out Ringbolt Rapids, where swift water makes for an additional challenge. Work Barge on the Arizona side has a 38-foot tow barge that sank in 1946. Cabinsite Point has two boat wrecks to view.

=== Personal watercraft ===
PWCs allowed to be operated within Lake Mead National Recreation Area, which encompasses Lake Mead and Lake Mohave, include all PWCs with four-stroke-powered engines, and two-stroke engines meeting EPA 2006 emission standards. As of December 31, 2012 many two-stroke personal watercraft are no longer allowed to operate within Lake Mead National Recreation Area. These include any PWC with a carbureted two-stroke engine. Enforcement began January 1, 2013 as part of a ten-year phase-in, based on the final rule to prohibit these PWCs being approved in April 2003.

=== Hot springs ===
The volcanic origin of Black Canyon and Cottonwood Valley has resulted in a number of hot springs along the northern portion of Lake Mohave. Gold Strike Hot Springs is located very close to the shore which is accessible from a trailhead 1.2 miles south of the Hoover Dam. These springs are also available from the Gold Strike Hot Springs Trail Head two miles east of the Hoover Dam in Boulder City, Nevada. Due to the easy two mile hike from public parking and consistent pools, these springs are frequently visited. Two Mile Hot Springs and Arizona Hot Springs are within a few miles of this same area and offer a more private experience.

== Fish species ==
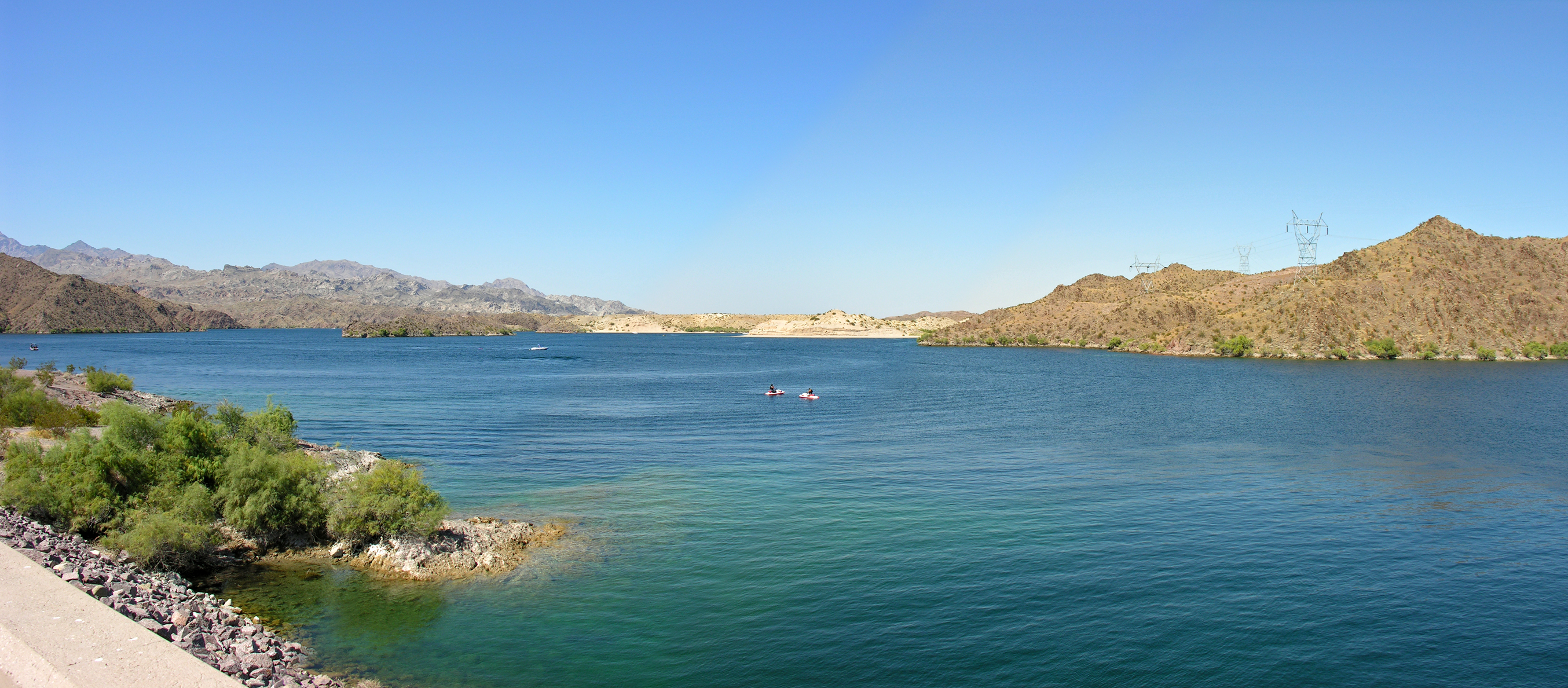
View across the surface of Lake Mohave.

=== Native fish ===
- Bonytail chub (endangered)
- Razorback sucker (endangered)

=== Introduced fish ===
- Bluegill
- Channel catfish
- Common carp
- Crappie
- Green sunfish
- Largemouth bass
- Rainbow trout
- Smallmouth bass
- Striped bass
- Threadfin shad
- Yellow bullhead catfish

== Fish enhancement projects ==
The non-native sport fishery in Lake Mohave is enhanced by a Nevada Division of Wildlife program which places artificial habitat bundles in coves around the reservoir. The habitats are composed primarily of bundled salt cedar trees attached to wooden pallets. When placed in the water, the structures create cover for sport fish.

Additionally, Lake Mohave contains one of the largest and most genetically diverse population of razorback sucker remaining in the wild. Each spring, a multi-agency group of fish biologists use underwater lights to collect approximately 30,000 razorback sucker larvae along the shore of Lake Mohave, which would otherwise be eaten by introduced fishes. Larvae are then transported by boat to Willow Beach National Fish Hatchery where they grow in protected raceways for up to three years. When individuals have reached approximately 14 inches in length, they are released back into Lake Mohave in order to avoid predation by larger, introduced game fish such as striped bass.

== Gallery ==
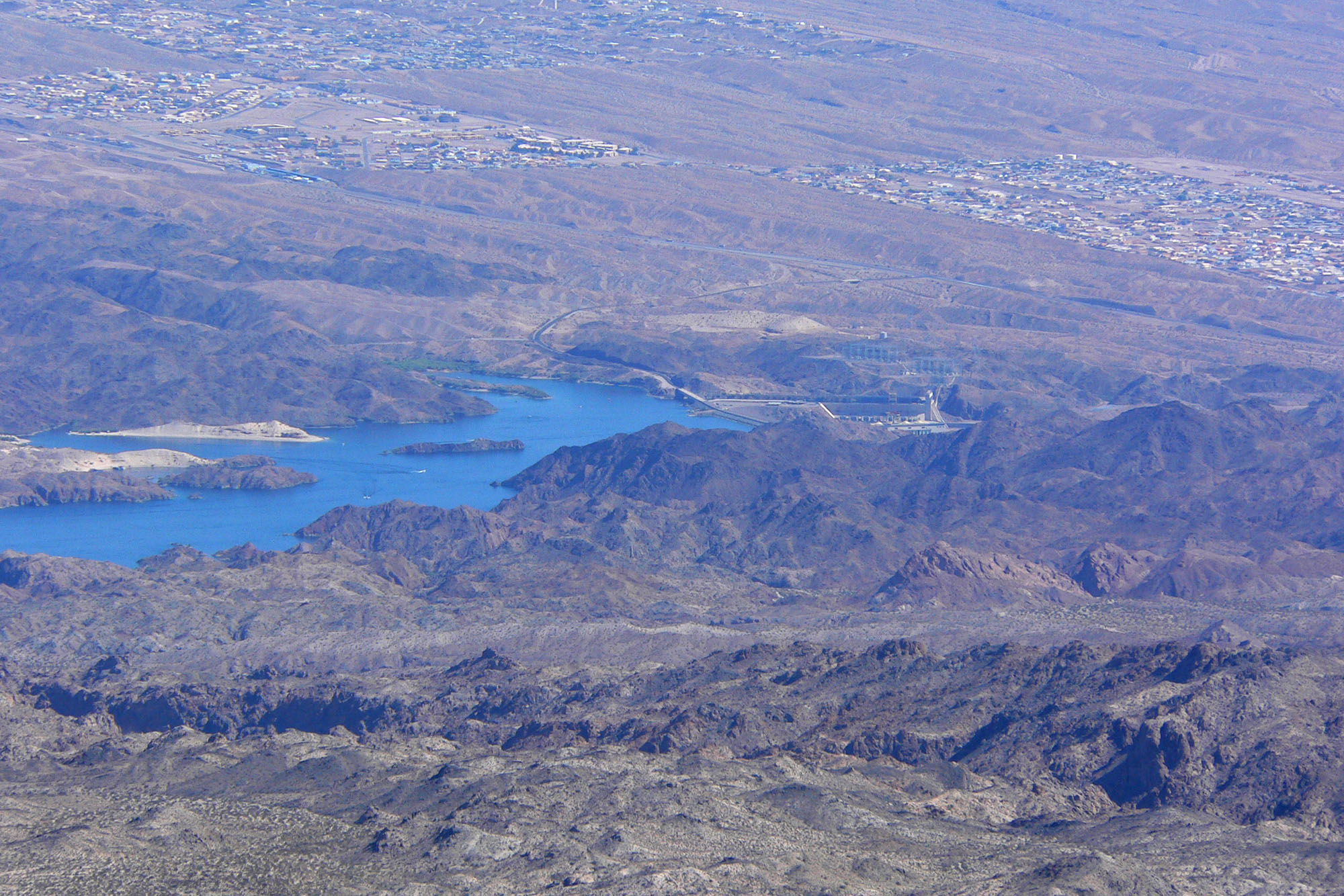
Lake Mohave from Spirit Mountain 3.

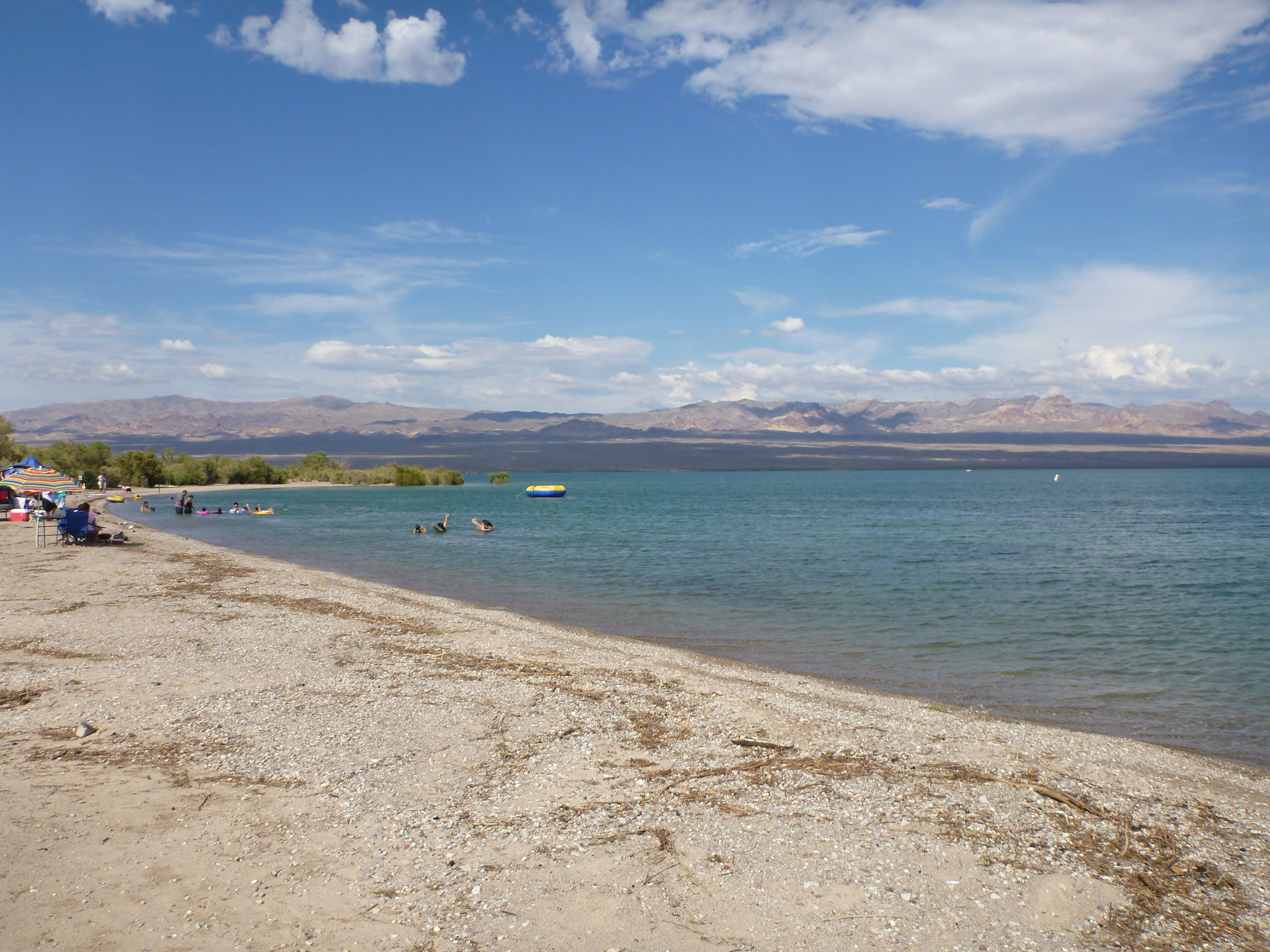
Six Mile Cove at Lake Mohave, Nevada.

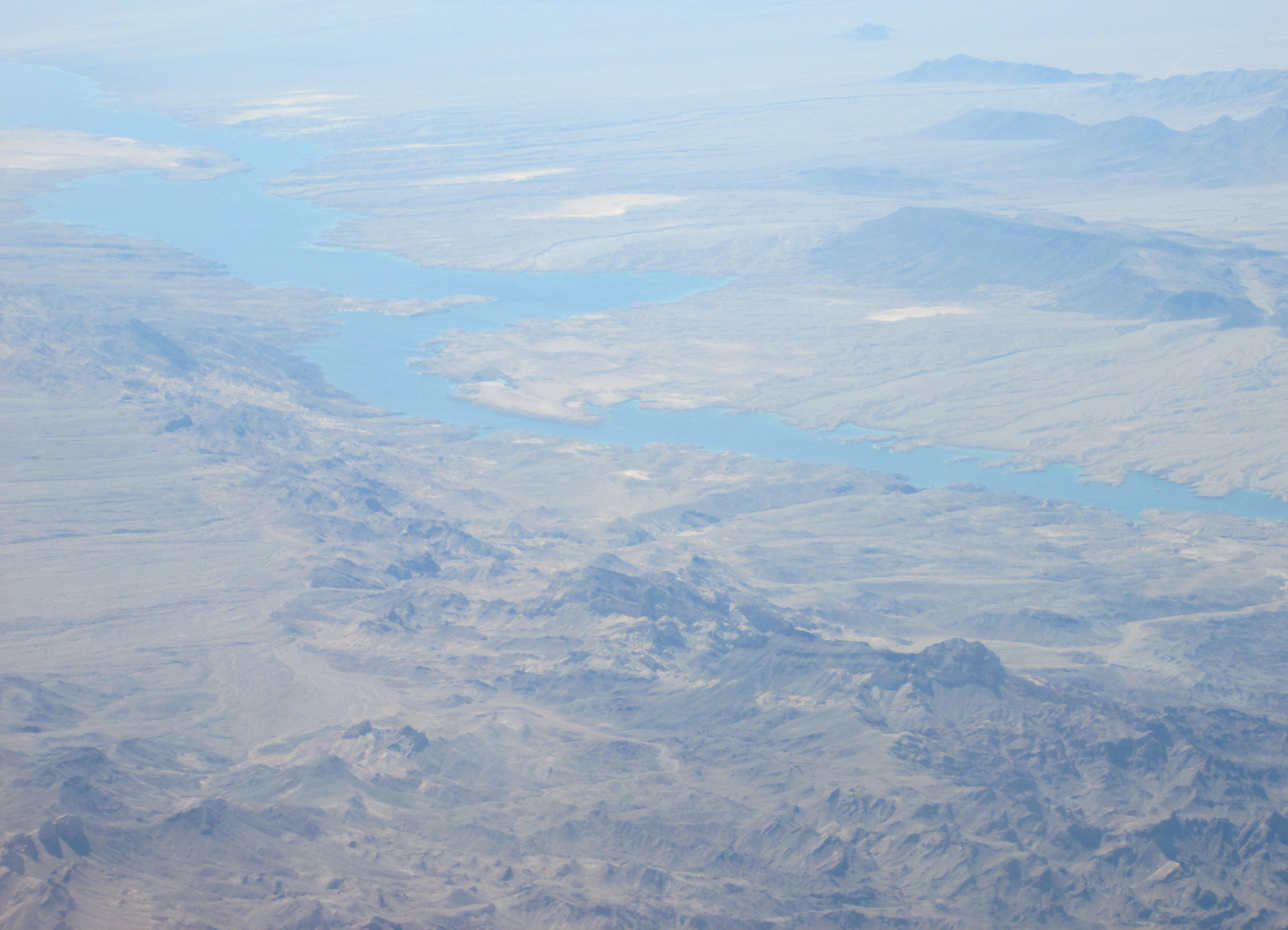
Aerial view of the northern end of Lake Mohave, just south of Davis Dam.

== See also ==
- Katherine's Landing, Lake Mohave
- Cottonwood Basin (Lake Mohave)
