= Arthur Powell Davis =

American hydrographer, engineer, geographer and topographer

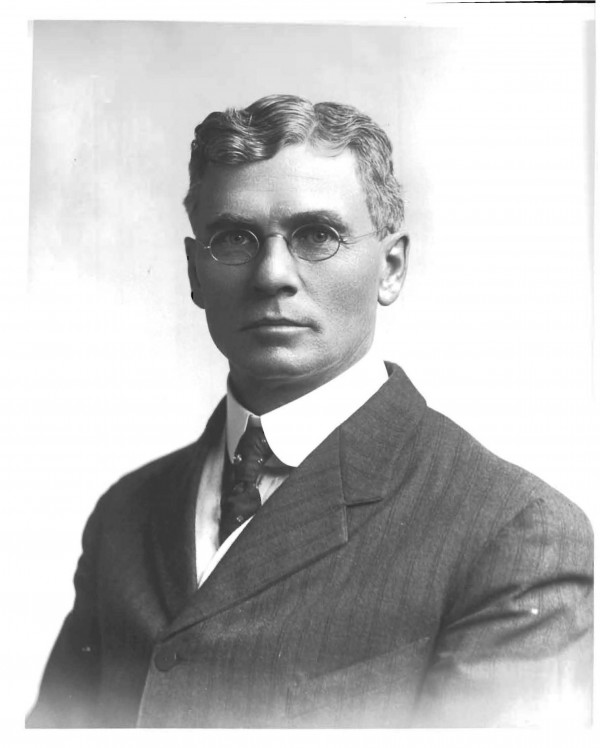
- Born: February 9, 1861; Decatur, Illinois, U.S.
- Died: August 7, 1933 (aged 72); Oakland, California, U.S.
- Resting place: Rock Creek Cemetery; Washington, D.C., U.S.
- Education: George Washington University
- Occupation: Hydrographer
- Employer: U.S. Geological Survey
- Known for: Co-founding the National Geographic Society
- Relatives: John Wesley Powell (uncle)

Arthur Powell Davis (February 9, 1861 – August 7, 1933) was an American hydrographer, engineer, geographer, topographer and nephew of John Wesley Powell. He was born on February 9, 1861, in Decatur, Illinois and received his Civil Engineering degree from George Washington University in 1888. Upon graduation he joined his uncle west on the US Geological Survey through New Mexico, Arizona, and California. He then worked in hydrography in places as far flung as China, Puerto Rico, Nicaragua, Panama, and Turkestan. In 1888 he co-founded the National Geographic Society, and in 1907 he was elected president of the Washington Society of Engineers. He served as the director of the Reclamation Service (now the U.S. Bureau of Reclamation) from 1914 to 1923. He was elected to the American Academy of Arts and Sciences in 1921 and the American Philosophical Society in 1927.

Boulder Dam (later called Hoover Dam) was fundamentally the conception of Arthur Powell Davis. A month before he died, Arthur Powell Davis was appointed Consulting Engineer on the dam project. Mr. Davis had his vision back in 1902. He died in Oakland, California, on August 7, 1933, and is buried in St. Paul's Rock Creek Cemetery in Washington, D.C., along with his wife, Elizabeth B. Davis. The Davis Dam is named after him. Like other progressive Republicans, Arthur Davis had deep faith in the role of experts (he himself held a degree in civil engineering), worshipped efficiency, and viewed the federal government as a major instrument for social and political reform.

== See also ==
- An American Engineer in Stalin's Russia: The Memoirs of Zara Witkin, 1932–1934. "Arthur Powell Davis, the distinguished American reclamation engineer, ...worked in old Russia under the Czar and also for the Soviet Government for several years prior to 1932, engaged in designing a giant irrigation project in southeastern Russia." (p. 51)
