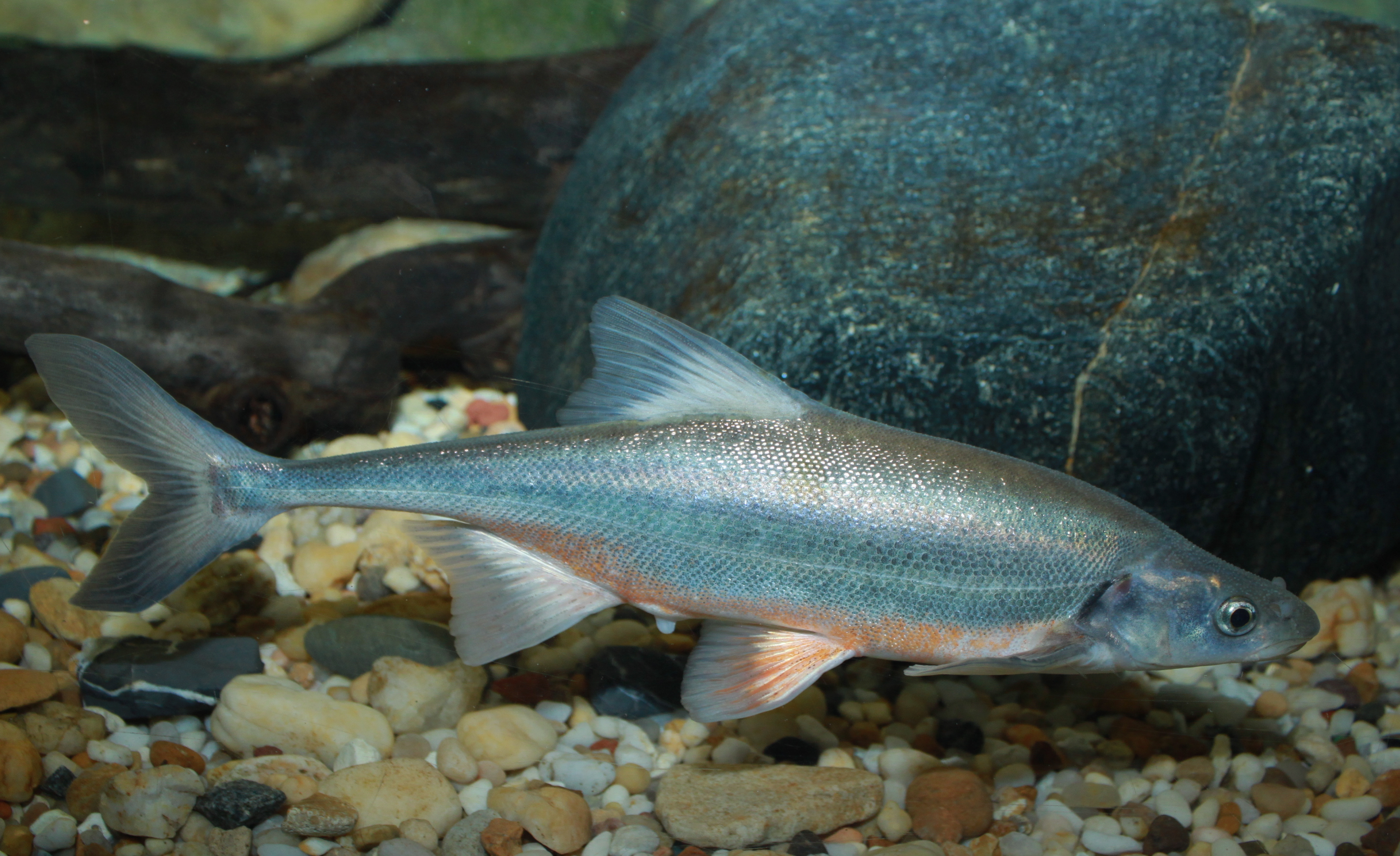

Conservation status
- Critically Endangered (IUCN 3.1)

Scientific classification
- Kingdom: Animalia
- Phylum: Chordata
- Class: Actinopterygii
- Order: Cypriniformes
- Family: Leuciscidae
- Genus: Gila
- Species: G. elegans

Binomial name
- Gila elegans S. F. Baird & Girard, 1853

= Bonytail chub =

Species of fish

The bonytail chub or bonytail (Gila elegans) is a species of freshwater ray-finned fish belonging to the family Leuciscidae, which includes the daces, chubs, Eurasian minnows, and related species. This fish is native to the Colorado River Basin of Arizona, California, Colorado, Nevada, New Mexico, Utah, and Wyoming in the Southwestern United States; it has been extirpated from the part of the basin in Mexico. It was once abundant and widespread in the basin, its numbers and range have declined to where it has been listed as endangered since 1980 (Endangered Species Act of 1973) and 1986 (IUCN), a fate shared by the other large Colorado basin endemic fish species such as the Colorado pikeminnow, humpback chub, and razorback sucker. It is now the rarest of the endemic big-river fishes of the Colorado River. Twenty species are in the genus Gila, seven of which are found in Arizona.

== Description ==
A bonytail chub can grow to 62 cm (2 ft) long. Like many other desert fishes, its coloring tends to be darker above and lighter below, serving as a camouflage. Breeding males have red fin bases. They have a streamlined body and a terminal mouth. Bonytail chubs have bodies that sometimes arch into a smooth, predorsal hump (in adults). While their skull is quite concave, their caudal peduncle (tailside) is thin and almost looks like a pencil (hence, "bony tail"). The coloration of bonytail chubs is usually dark dorsally and lighter ventrally, but in very clear waters, they look almost black all over. During breeding season, males and females have distinct coloration, as well. Mature males have bright red-orange lateral bands between their paired fins, while females have a more subdued coloration that is described with the males.

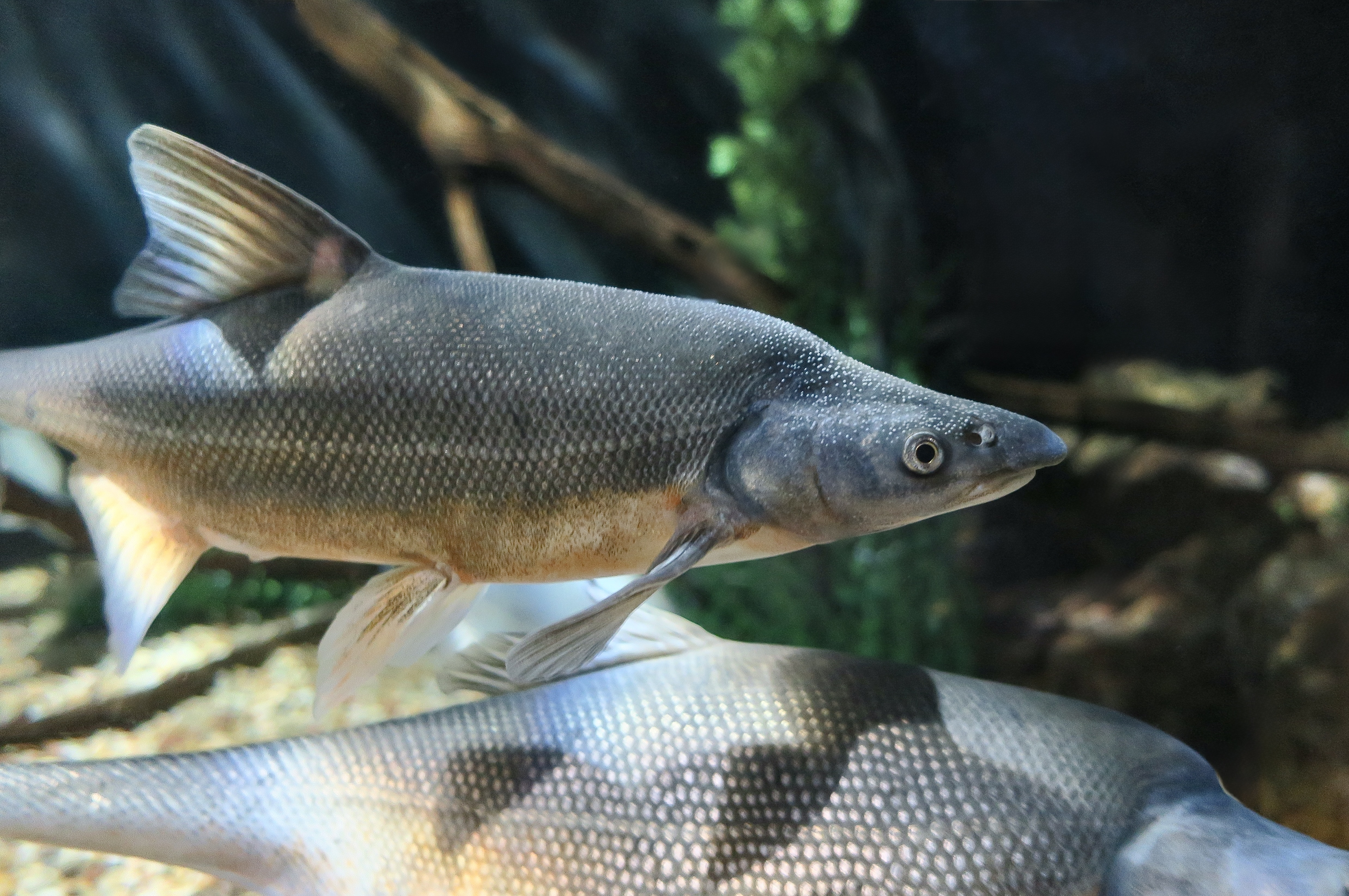
Bonytail chub at OdySea Aquarium.

== Range and status ==
The bonytail chub was once found in the Colorado River basin in many U.S. states, including Arizona, California, Colorado, Nevada, New Mexico, Utah, and Wyoming. It also occurred in the part of the basin in Mexico, but it has been extirpated from this country. This fish species experienced the most abrupt decline of any of the long-lived fishes native to the main stems of the Colorado River system. No remaining wild population is self-sustaining, and it is functionally extinct. Its survival currently relies on release of hatchery-produced fish; several hatcheries maintain this species. Bonytail chubs were one of the first fish species to reflect the changes that occurred in the Colorado River basin after the construction of Hoover Dam; the fish was extirpated from the lower basin between 1926 and 1950. They may still be found in the Green River of Utah and perhaps in the larger Colorado River water bodies. Gila elegans was added to the US list of endangered species on April 23, 1980 and was first recognized as endangered in 1986 by IUCN. In 2013, its IUCN status was upgraded to critically endangered.

Reintroduction of the bonytail chub is contentious. Some are concerned about the amount of water used to increase stream flows that are required for adequate bonytail chub habitat. Bass fishermen are concerned about facilitating the recovery of the bonytail chub by the removal of smallmouth bass, a popular gamefish. Fears of spreading the quagga mussel, an invasive species that clogs water pipelines and fouls marine equipment, has halted the reintroduction of the bonytail chub in Arizona, pending establishment of a stocking protocol that is satisfactory to Arizona wildlife officials.

== Habitat ==
Bonytail chub prefer backwaters with rocky or muddy bottoms and flowing pools, although they have been reported in swiftly moving water. They are mostly restricted to rocky canyons today, but were historically abundant in the wide downstream sections of rivers.

== Biology ==
Young bonytail chubs typically eat aquatic plants, while adults feed mostly on small fish, algae, plant debris, and terrestrial insects.

Bonytail chubs are long-lived and may reach an age of up to 50 years.

=== Reproduction ===
Little is known about their reproductive habits, but they are thought to spawn in midsummer and perhaps hybridize with both roundtail and humpback chubs. Spawning in Lake Mohave has been observed during May, while in the upper Green River, it occurs in June and July. Eggs are laid randomly over the bottom, and no parental care occurs.

== Conservation ==
The bonytail chub's population sizes are small and declining. The depletion of the population is primarily due to the habitat alterations caused by dams and competition and predation by non-native fish.

A USFWS Recovery Plan established in 1990 included the objectives of protecting the habitats of the bonytail chub, and even reintroducing hatchery-reared fish into the wild.

The Bonytail Chub Recovery Plan was approved on September 4, 1990, and refugia for the bonytail chub exist today in several places: Dexter National Fish Hatchery, New Mexico; Arizona Game and Fish Page Springs Hatchery; Ouray National Wildlife Refuge, Ouray, Utah; Buenos Aires National Wildlife Refuge, Sasabe, Arizona; and Niland Native Fish Ponds, California.
