= Davis Dam =

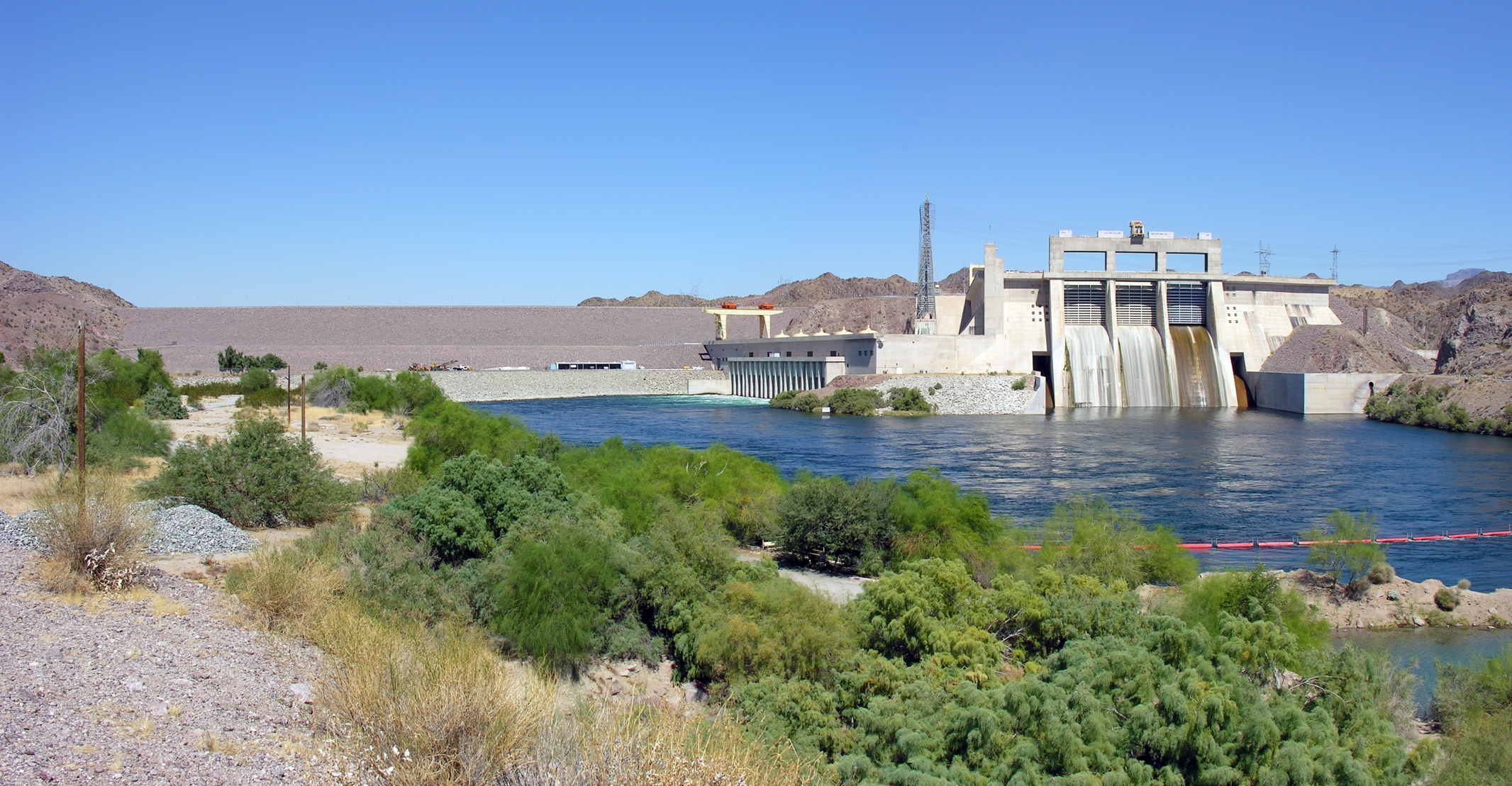
- Davis Dam
- Interactive map of Davis Dam
- Official name: Davis Dam
- Location: Clark County, Nevada / Mohave County, Arizona, USA
- Coordinates: 35.19876°N 114.56949°W
- Opening date: 1951
- Operator: U.S. Bureau of Reclamation

Dam and spillways
- Impounds: Colorado River
- Height: 200 feet (61 m)
- Length: 1,600 feet (490 m)

Reservoir
- Creates: Lake Mohave
- Surface area: 26,500 acres (10,700 ha)

Power Station
- Hydraulic head: 135 feet (41 m)
- Turbines: 5 Francis turbines
- Installed capacity: 251 MW
- Annual generation: 1148 GWh

Davis Dam is a dam on the Colorado River about 70 miles (110 km) downstream from Hoover Dam. It stretches across the border between Arizona and Nevada. Originally called Bullhead Dam, Davis Dam was renamed after Arthur Powell Davis, who was the director of the U.S. Bureau of Reclamation from 1914 to 1923. The United States Bureau of Reclamation owns and operates the dam, which was completed in 1951.

Davis Dam impounds the Colorado River and forms Lake Mohave.

== Description ==
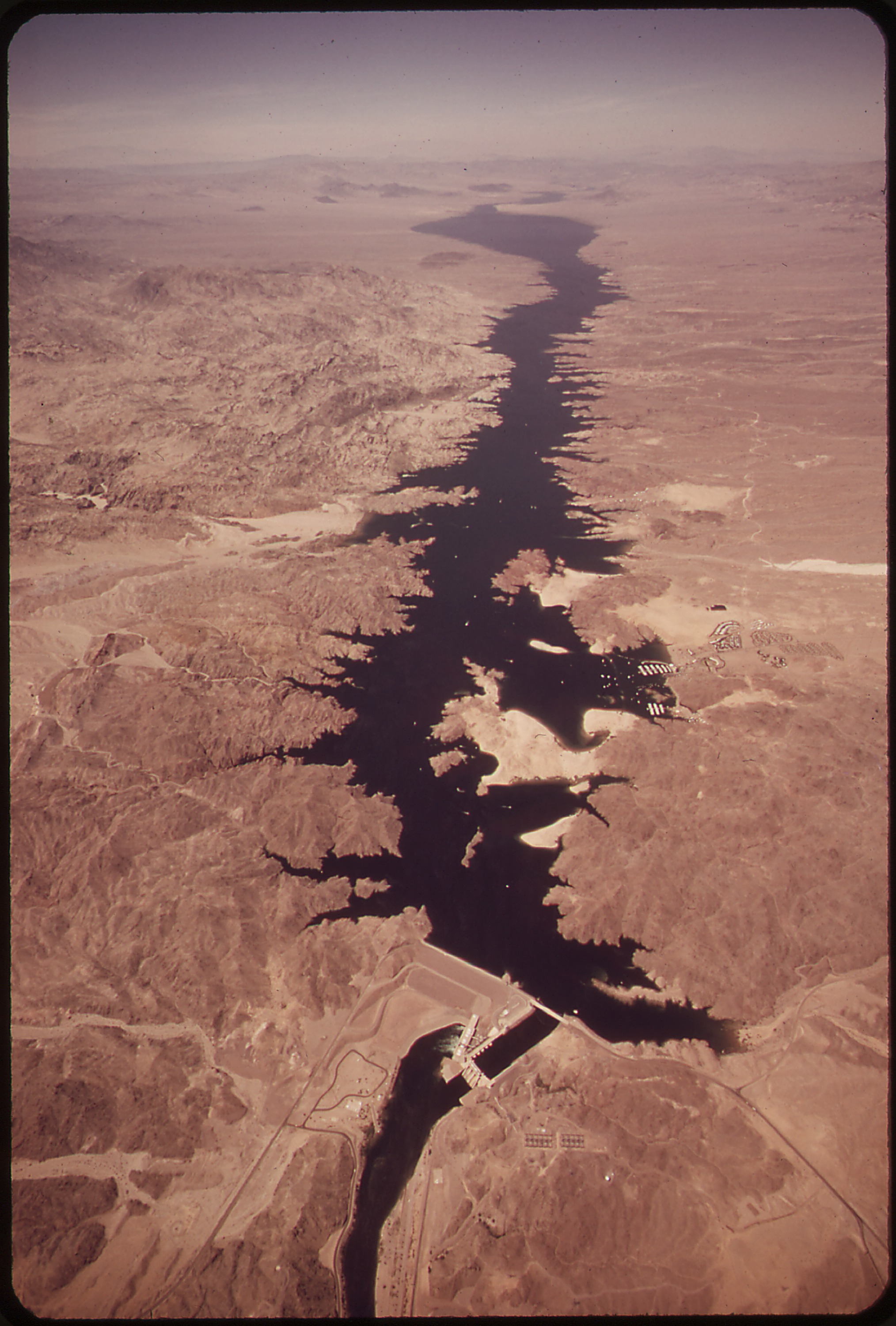
Aerial view of Davis Dam and Lake Mohave.

Davis Dam

Davis Dam is a zoned earth-fill dam with a concrete spillway, 1,600 ft (490 m) in length at the crest, and 200 ft (61 m) high. The earth fill dam begins on the Nevada side, but it does not extend to the Arizona side on the east. Instead, there is an inlet formed by earth and concrete, that includes the spillway. The hydroelectric power plant is beside the inlet.

The dam's purpose is to re-regulate releases from Hoover Dam upstream, and facilitate the delivery of Colorado River water to Mexico. Laughlin, Nevada is located just below along the river while the Bullhead City, Arizona city limits include part of the dam. Davis Camp is also nearby, operated as a park by Mohave County. Bullhead City was originally a construction town for workers building the dam.

A road is located on the crest of the earth fill portion of the dam and a Forebay Bridge spans the Forebay. It was formerly part of Arizona State Route 68 to Nevada. In April 2004, the roadway was shut down to vehicle traffic. Pedestrian and bicycle traffic are permitted. The old roadway is now an extension of the Heritage Trail system. Barriers have been placed on the former road at each end of the earthen dam. The facility is heavily patrolled by security forces who strictly enforce parking regulations.

Davis Dam Hydroelectric Power Plant

The Davis Dam Power Plant is a hydroelectric power plant located on the Arizona side of the dam, beside the inlet. The hydroelectric plant generates between 1 and 2 terawatt-hours of electricity annually. The plant has a capacity of 251 MW (337,000 hp) and the tops of its five Francis turbines are visible from outside the plant. The plant's head is 136 ft (41 m).

== See also ==
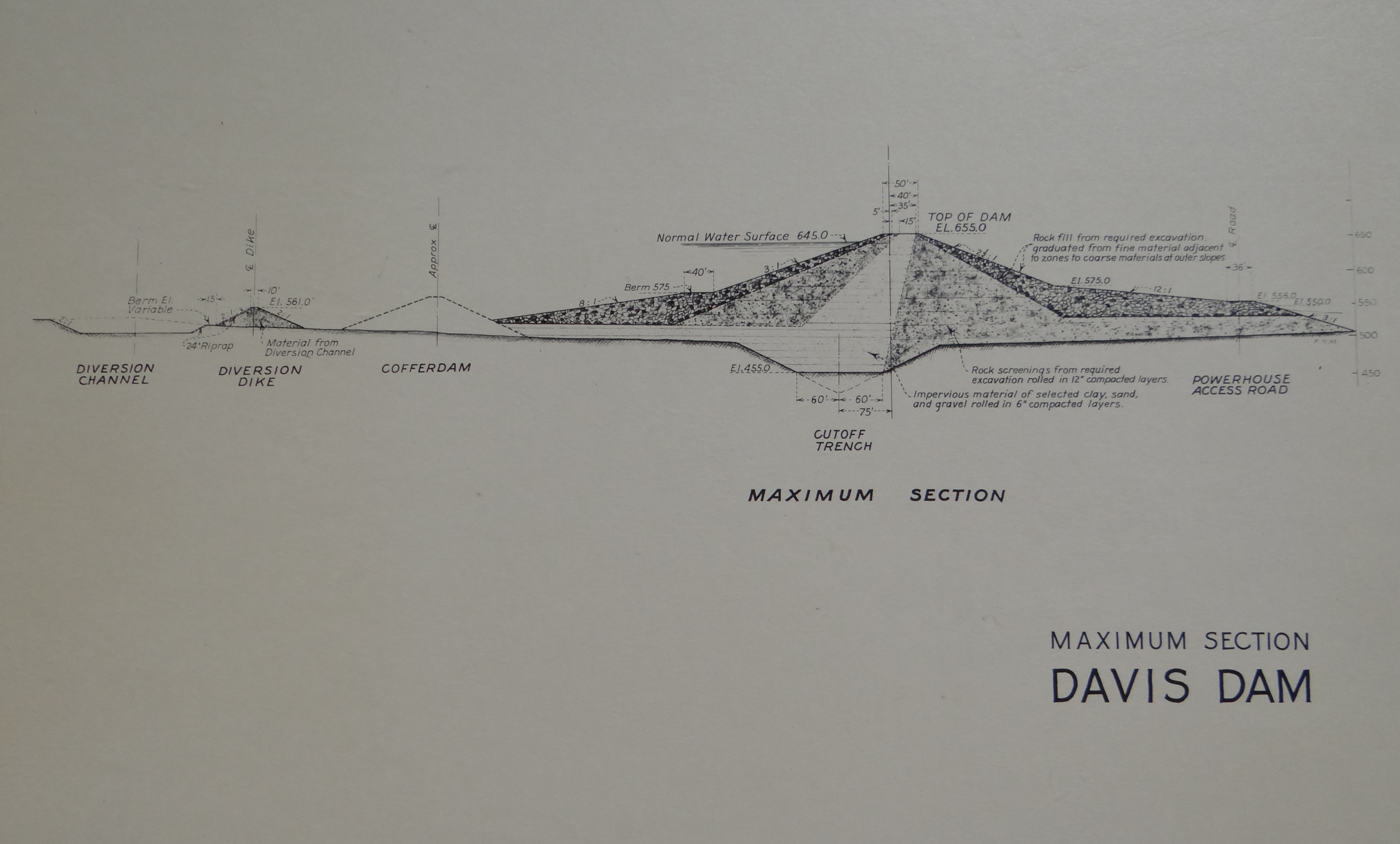
Original engineering drawings

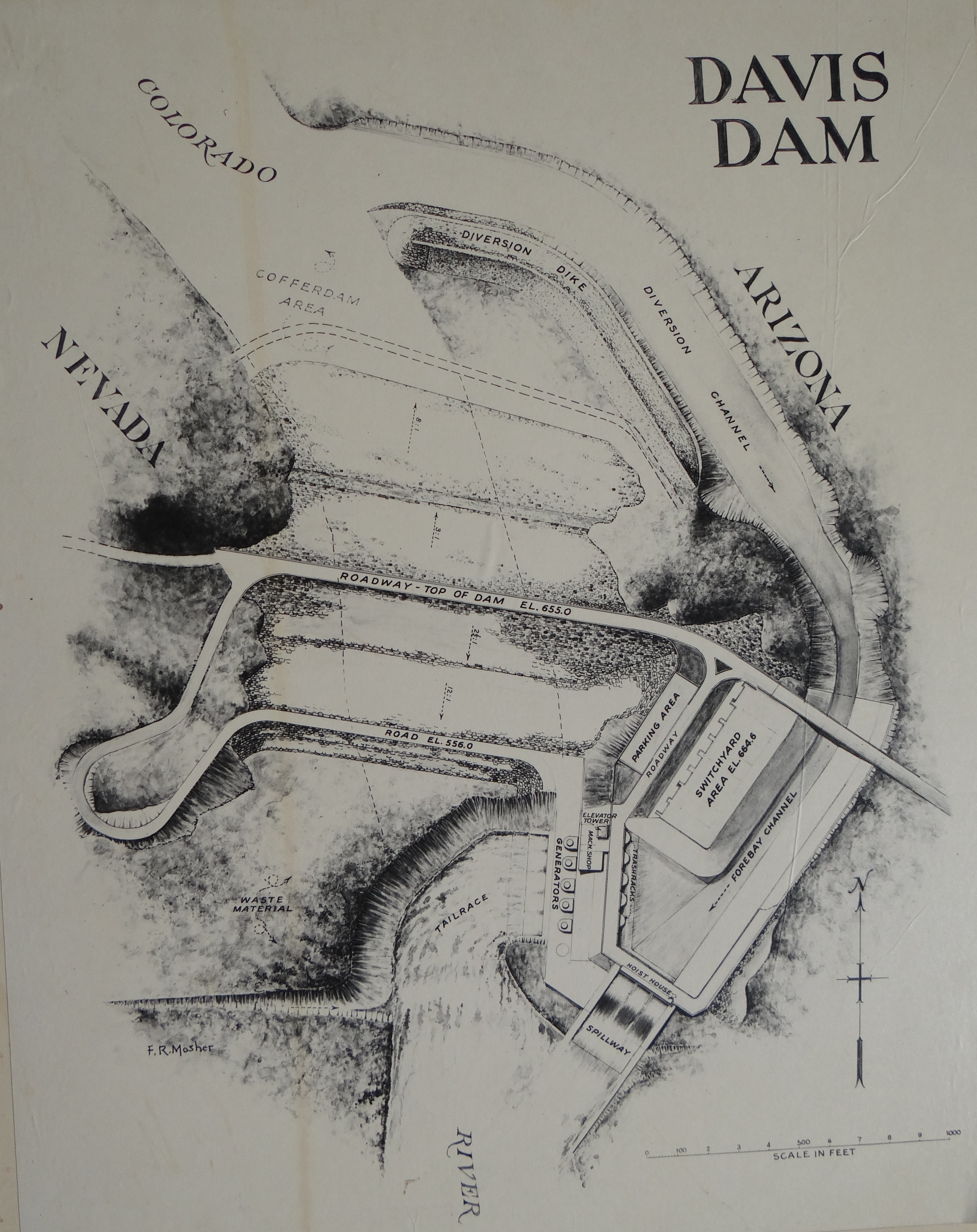
Original engineering drawings

- Dams of the Lower Colorado River Valley
- Bullhead City, Arizona
- Laughlin, Nevada
- List of power stations in the United States
