= Ouray Peak =

Mountain in Colorado, United States

- Location within Colorado

Highest point
- Elevation: 12,963 ft (3,951 m)
- Coordinates: 39°03′15″N 106°33′54″W

Geography
- Location: Chaffee County, Colorado, U.S.
- Parent range: Sawatch Mountains
- Topo map(s): USGS 7.5' topographic map Independence Pass, Colorado

Ouray Peak, elevation 12,963 ft (3,951 m), is a summit in the Sawatch Mountains of Colorado. The peak is 6 mi (9.7 km) south of Independence Pass in the Collegiate Peaks Wilderness of San Isabel National Forest.

== See also ==
- List of Colorado mountain ranges
- List of Colorado mountain summits
  - List of Colorado fourteeners
  - List of Colorado 4000 meter prominent summits
  - List of the most prominent summits of Colorado
- List of Colorado county high points
