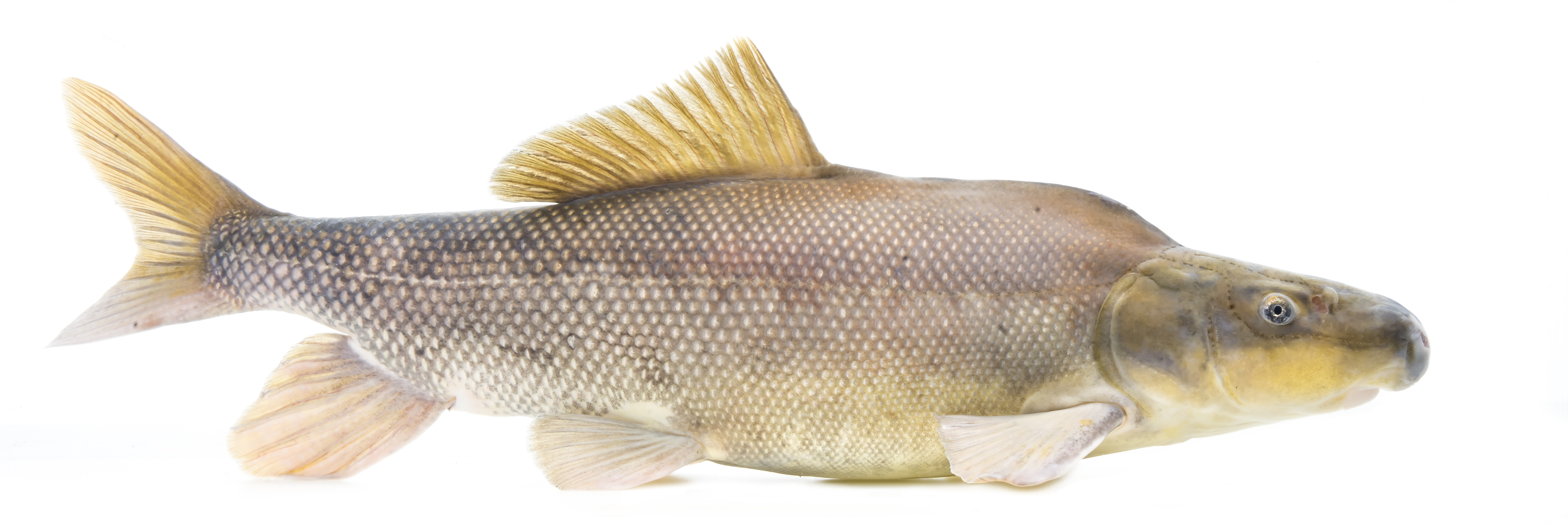

Conservation status
- Critically Endangered (IUCN 3.1)

- Critically Imperiled (NatureServe)

Scientific classification
- Kingdom: Animalia
- Phylum: Chordata
- Class: Actinopterygii
- Division: Teleostei
- Order: Cypriniformes
- Family: Catostomidae
- Subfamily: Catostominae
- Genus: Xyrauchen; C. H. Eigenmann & Kirsch, 1889
- Species: X. texanus

Binomial name
- Xyrauchen texanus (C. C. Abbott, 1860)

Synonyms
- Catostomus texanus Abbott, 1860 (basionym); Quassilabia cypho Lockington, 1879; Catostomus (Xyrauchen) texanus

= Razorback sucker =

Razorback sucker Temporal range: Early Pliocene to present

Species of fish

The razorback sucker (Xyrauchen texanus) is a suckerfish found in rivers and lakes in the southwestern United States and formerly northwestern Mexico. It can grow to 91 cm (3 ft) in length and is recognisable by the keel between its head and dorsal fin. It used to inhabit much of the Colorado River Basin but commercial fishing, river damming, and habitat loss have caused great declines in populations. It is now restricted to the Colorado River upstream of the Grand Canyon and to four reservoirs, Lake Mead, Lake Mohave, Lake Havasu, and Lake Powell.

It usually moves from deep water to suitable spawning grounds to breed, and research into its habits and breeding locations is ongoing. It has been a federally protected fish since 1991 and is rated as "Critically Endangered" by the International Union for Conservation of Nature, and Critically Imperiled by NatureServe. There are some signs of recovery, with fish being observed in the lower Grand Canyon in 2012 and 2013.

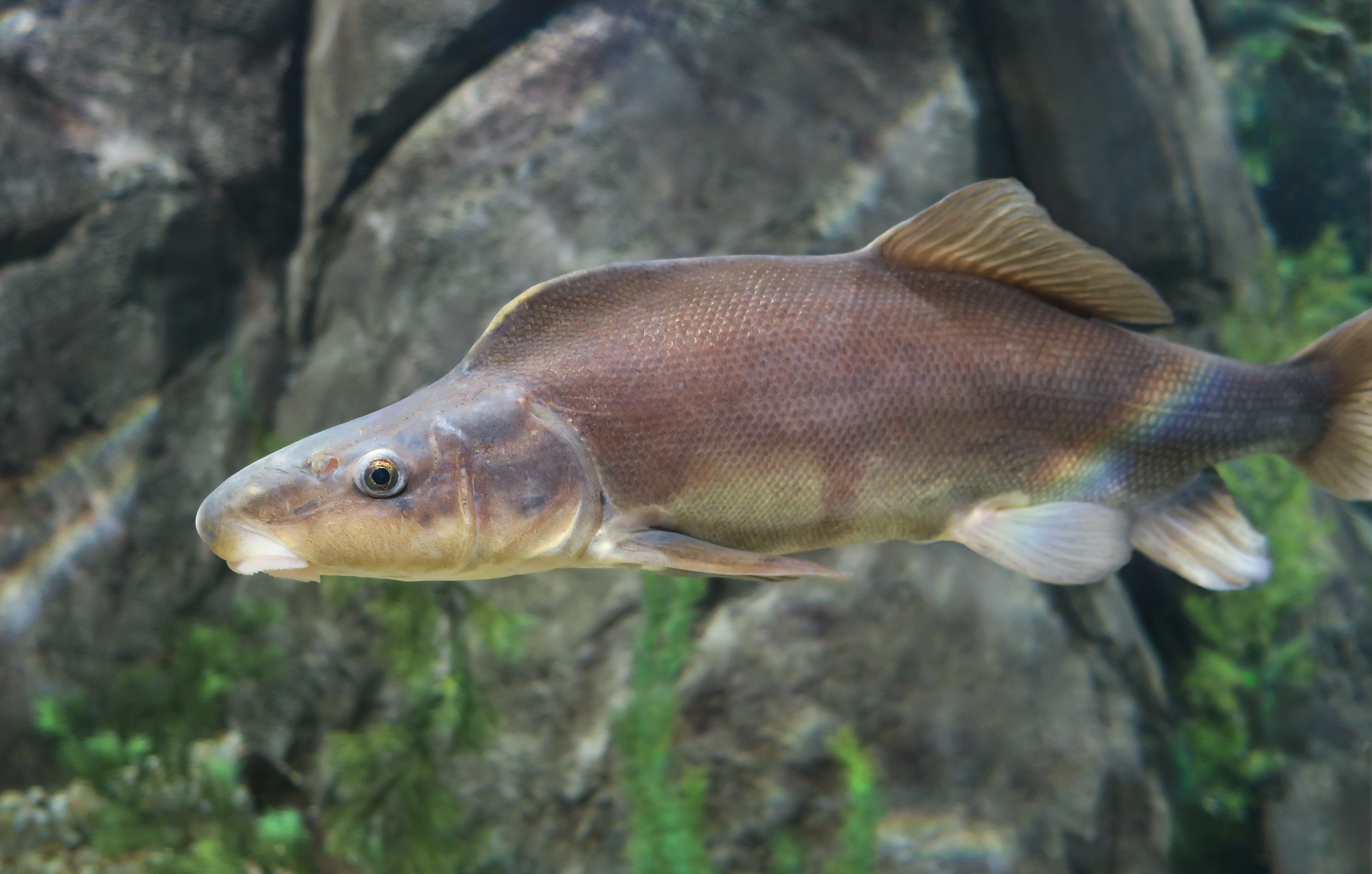
A razorback sucker at OdySea Aquarium.

== Description ==
The razorback sucker is most notable for the sharp-edged bulge on the anterior part of its back, between the head and dorsal fin, giving rise to its common name, as well as to the alternative name "humpback sucker". The fish can attain lengths of up to 91 cm (3 ft) and weights of 6 kg (13.2 lb). A common length is 50 cm (1.6 ft). The fish has an olivaceous to brown-black color on top grading to a lighter yellow below. Adult razorbacks are easily distinguished from other suckers by the predorsal keel.

== Taxonomy ==
The former species "Xyrauchen uncompahgre" Jordan & Evermann in Jordan, 1891, described from the Uncompahgre River, is now known to represent a hybrid between this species and Catostomus latipinnis. Due to the hybridization between Xyrauchen and Catostomus, some authors have tentatively placed it as a species of Catostomus. However, most recent authorities continue to retain it as a distinct genus.

A complete fossil skeleton of a razorback sucker has been described from the Early Pliocene-aged Diablo Formation of the Anza-Borrego Desert, California. This specimen preserves the distinctive hump of the species. The discovery of the specimen in this area suggests that the Colorado River basin likely extended into this part of California during the Neogene. Younger partial remains of Xyrauchen are also known from the Pleistocene-aged Ocotillo Formation of California.

== Distribution ==
The species originally occurred throughout the medium-sized and large rivers of the Colorado River Basin, including to the states of Baja California and Sonora in Mexico, but its range has shrunk to the river above the Grand Canyon, and to Lake Mead, Lake Mohave, and Lake Havasu on the lower part of the river. It is also considered extirpated from Wyoming. The reason for the decline is largely due to habitat loss. The state of California designated it as endangered in 1974, followed by the United States government in 1991. A population of over 3,000 fish in Lake Mohave has been created by an augmentation program using fry that were produced naturally in the lake. In addition, reintroduction programs have released hatchery-raised fish into Lake Havasu, the Colorado River below Parker Dam, and the Verde River.

In 2012 and again in 2013, razorback sucker have been detected in the lower Grand Canyon. These were the first recorded sightings in the Grand Canyon National Park since the 1990s. In March 2014, in an effort to find out more about this wild population, nine tagged adult razorback sucker were released into the River Colorado below the Lava Falls. By tracking these fish, biologists hope to be able to detect the whereabouts of other spawning fish and assess their movements and how they use the habitat.

In spring 2014 a new search for reproduction of the fish at Grand Canyon National Park resulted in the first finding of larvae for several decades. On nine of 47 sites, spawning Razorbacks were found.

Populations in the Green and Colorado rivers upstream of Glen Canyon Dam have been reestablished through a stocking program and stocked razorback suckers have consistently spawned and produced larval fish.

As of 2021, the only self-sustaining population of razorback sucker is found in Lake Mead. While larval fish are found in other areas, indicative of successful spawning, recruitment (survival to adulthood) is insufficient or absent due to predation. Non-native predators of the razorback sucker include striped bass and flathead catfish in the Lower Colorado Basin and smallmouth bass, northern pike and walleye in the Upper Colorado Basin, with channel catfish present in the San Juan River subbasin.

== Biology ==
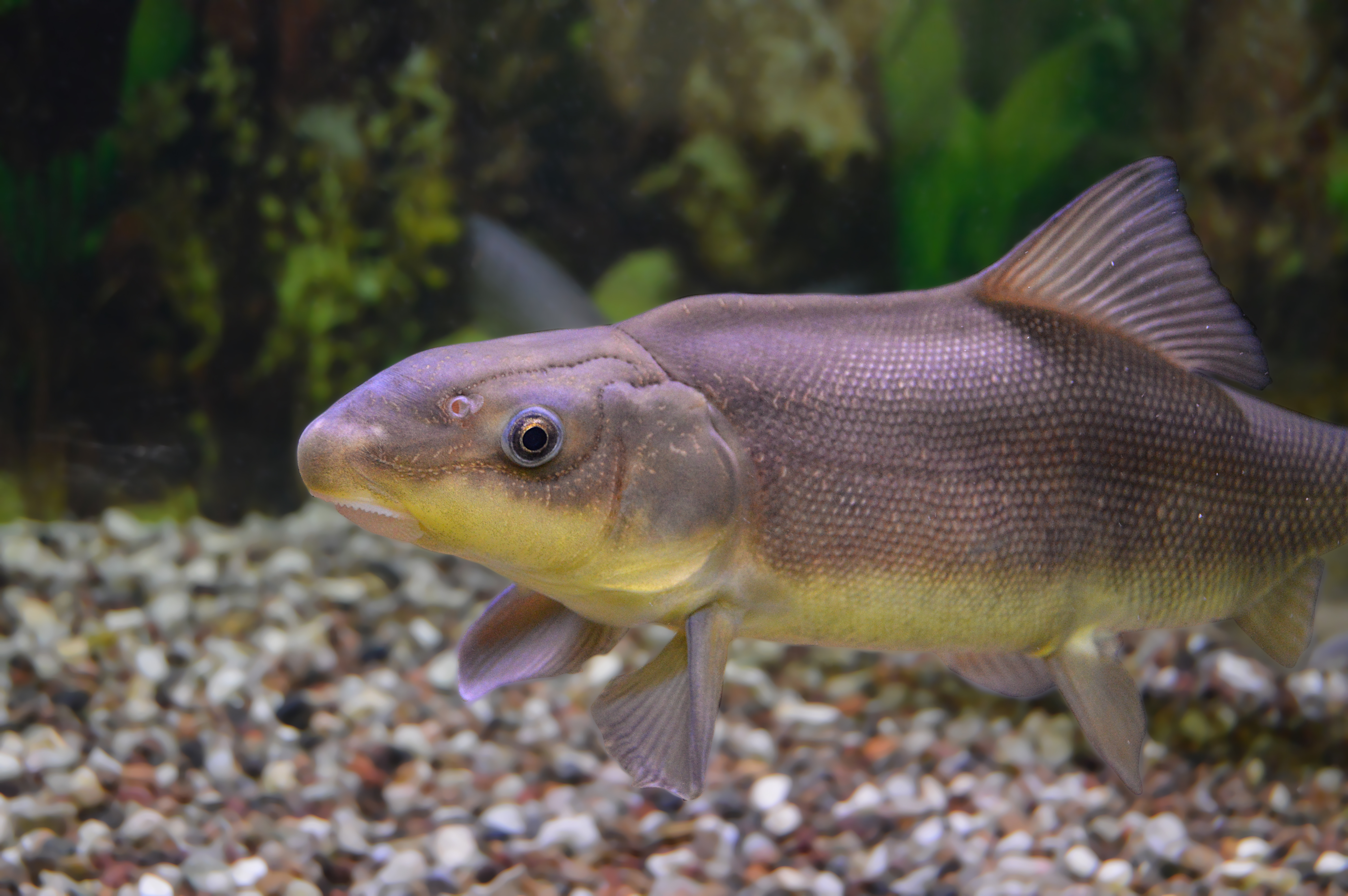
Adult razorback sucker

Razorback suckers are long-lived; older fishes have been estimated at more than 40 years. Both males and females mature at age four. Spawning occurs in late winter or spring when groups of razorbacks settle to the riverbed and release their gametes. The adhesive eggs become attached to the interstitial spaces in the gravel substrate. A single female is attended by two to twelve males, and the female will spawn repeatedly with several males. Hatching success depends on water temperature, with complete mortality at temperatures less than 10 °C (50 °F).

Razorback suckers inhabit a diversity of areas from mainstream channels to backwaters of medium and large streams or rivers. They prefer to live over sand, mud, or gravel bottoms. Razorbacks feed on algae, insect larvae, plankton, and detritus. The eyes are receptive to parts of the UV spectrum, particularly that portion of the retina that receives light from below. The Razorback spends most of its life at depths where UV light cannot penetrate but they move into the shallows for breeding. In the shallows, males stake out a breeding territory and hover near the riverbed. When another male enters the breeding area, the defending male rolls his eyes downward to reveal the upper third of the eye generating a flash of reflected sunlight. The strongest reflected component of the flash lies in the UV spectrum. The intruding male, swimming overhead, can see the flash below and will shy away from it. The eye flashes are not visible from a distance underwater and can thus be used to signal intruding males without alerting predators. Females do not react to the eye flashes.

== Conservation ==
The Razorback sucker was once common throughout the Gila River watershed regions of Arizona. Commercial fishing together with dam building decimated the fish stock, which were unable to breed due to lower water temperatures in the reservoirs while dams blocked their movement into smaller channels (Nabhan 1988:553). They are now federally listed (USFWS October 23, 1991) as an endangered species with provisions for the protection of its critical habitat. Ongoing conservation efforts are taking place throughout the Upper and Lower Colorado River Basins. The largest and most genetically diverse population is found in Lake Mohave, Arizona/Nevada border.

Since 2012, special spring releases from Flaming Gorge Dam have been timed to coincide with the presence of larval razorback sucker in the Green River. These flows mimic a more natural hydrograph and allow larval razorback sucker to access off channel wetlands as nursery habitat. These dam operations have proven successful with razorback sucker in wetlands regularly surviving past the larval stage and migrating back to the Green River. Subsequent encounters of fish tagged while emigrating from wetlands have documented limited recruitment to the adult population by wild spawned razorback sucker.

In 2021, the Fish and Wildlife Service proposed to reclassify the razorback sucker as threatened, rather than endangered, under the Endangered Species Act.
