= List of largest reservoirs of California =

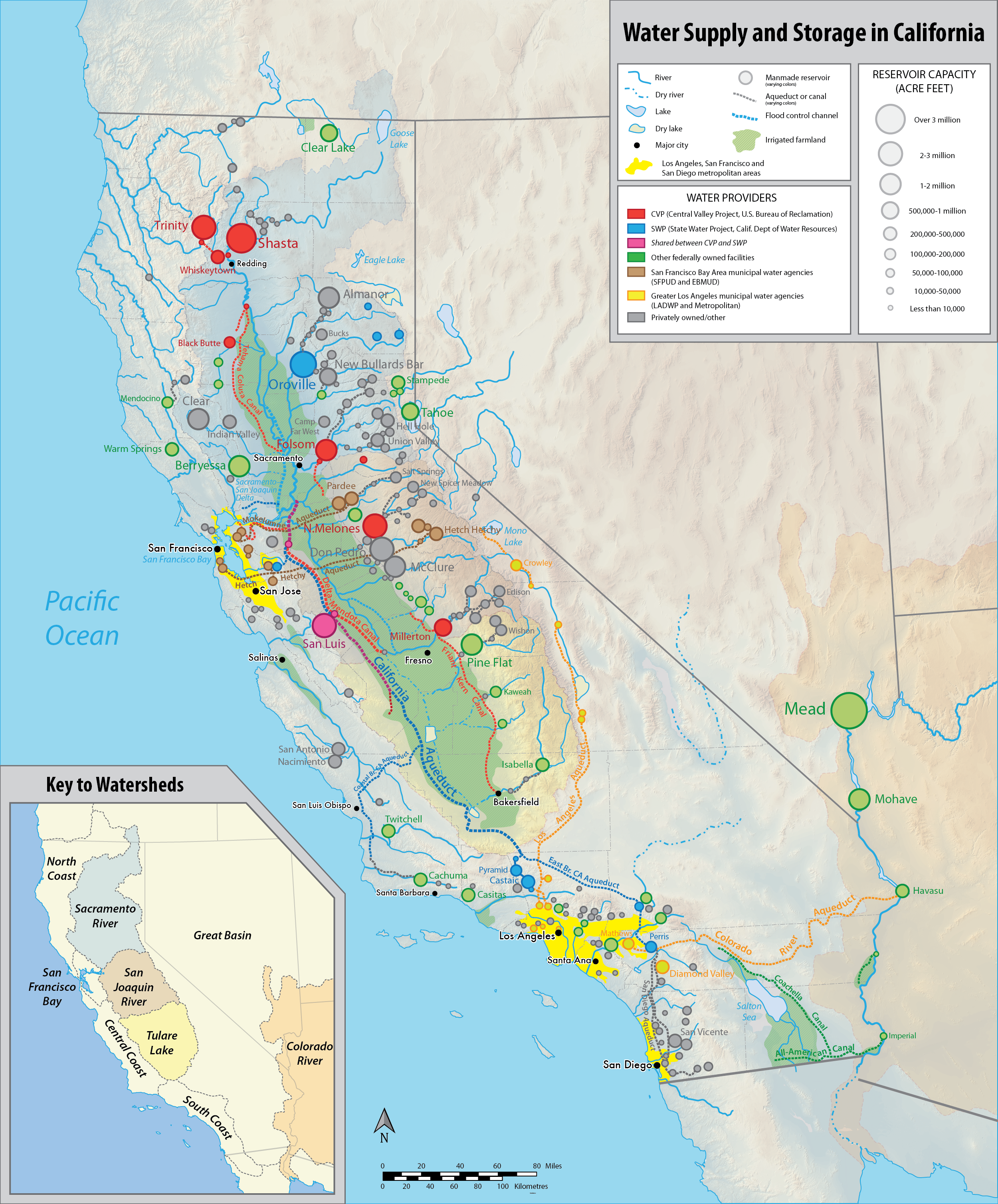
Map of California's interconnected water system, including all eleven reservoirs over 1,000,000 acre-feet (1.2 km^{3}) as well as selected smaller ones.

This is a list of the largest reservoirs, or man-made lakes, in the U.S. state of California. All fifty-three reservoirs that contain over 100,000 acre-feet (0.12 km^{3}) of water at maximum capacity are listed. This includes those formed by raising the level of natural lakes, such as at Lake Tahoe. Most large reservoirs in California are owned by the federal Bureau of Reclamation and to a lesser extent the Army Corps of Engineers, many serving the Central Valley Project or State Water Project. Smaller ones are often run by county water agencies or irrigation and flood control districts.

The state has more than one thousand major reservoirs, of which the largest two hundred have a combined capacity of over 41,000,000 acre-feet (51 km^{3}). Most large reservoirs in California are located in the central and northern portions of the state, especially along the large and flood-prone rivers of the Central Valley. Eleven reservoirs have a storage capacity greater than or equal to 1,000,000 acre-feet (1.2 km^{3}); all of these except one are in or on drainages that feed into the Central Valley. The largest single reservoir in California is Shasta Lake, with a full volume of more than 4,552,000 acre-feet (5.615 km^{3}).

Key
† denotes reservoir not entirely in California
‡ denotes reservoir that is offstream or receives most of its water from a source not associated with its feeder stream(s).

== List ==
Name	County(s)	Coordinates	Volume (Note: Volume given is the maximum flood pool, not the operational or live storage capacity.) (acre-feet)	Volume (km^{3})	Outflow (Note: Not always applicable to off-stream reservoirs.)	Dam (Note: In the case of reservoirs with more than one main dam holding it back (e.g. Diamond Valley Lake), the name of the highest one will be given (in this case, the West Dam).)	Image
Shasta Lake	Shasta	40°45′15″N 122°21′13″W	4,552,000	5.615	Sacramento River	Shasta Dam	
Lake Oroville	Butte	39°32′14″N 121°29′00″W	3,537,577	4.364	Feather River	Oroville Dam	
Trinity Lake	Trinity	40°51′36″N 122°43′24″W	2,448,000	3.020	Trinity River	Trinity Dam	
New Melones Lake	Tuolumne, Calaveras	38°00′02″N 120°31′12″W	2,400,000	2.960	Stanislaus River	New Melones Dam	
San Luis Reservoir	Merced	37°04′04″N 121°07′52″W	2,041,000	2.518	San Luis Creek‡ (Note: San Luis Reservoir receives most of its water from the California Aqueduct.)	San Luis Dam	
Don Pedro Reservoir	Tuolumne	37°44′30″N 120°22′25″W	2,030,000	2.504	Tuolumne River	New Don Pedro Dam	
Lake Berryessa	Napa	38°31′53″N 122°09′49″W	1,602,000	1.976	Putah Creek	Monticello Dam	
Lake Almanor	Plumas	40°13′47″N 121°09′29″W	1,308,000	1.613	North Feather River	Canyon Dam	
Folsom Lake	Sacramento, El Dorado, Placer	38°43′26″N 121°07′03″W	1,120,200	1.382	American River	Folsom Dam	
Lake McClure	Mariposa	37°38′11″N 120°16′49″W	1,024,600	1.264	Merced River	New Exchequer Dam	
Pine Flat Lake	Fresno	36°49′57″N 119°19′33″W	1,000,000	1.233	Kings River	Pine Flat Dam	
New Bullards Bar Reservoir	Yuba	39°23′32″N 121°08′30″W	996,103	1.229	North Yuba River	New Bullards Bar Dam	
Diamond Valley Lake	Riverside	33°40′42″N 117°02′30″W	810,000	0.999	Domenigoni Creek‡ (Note: Diamond Valley Lake is the terminus of the Inland Feeder, part of the California State Water Project, and is also fed by the San Diego Aqueduct.)	West Dam	
Lake Tahoe (Note: This lake is natural, but was raised about 10 feet (3.0 m) by Lake Tahoe Dam, built in 1913.)	Placer, El Dorado, Douglas (NV)†, Washoe (NV)†	39°04′59″N 120°02′03″W	732,000	0.903	Truckee River	Lake Tahoe Dam	
Lake Havasu	San Bernardino, Mohave (AZ)†, La Paz (AZ)†	34°23′00″N 114°14′33″W	646,200	0.797	Colorado River	Parker Dam	
Lake Isabella	Kern	35°38′47″N 118°28′56″W	568,000	0.701	Kern River	Isabella Dam	
Clear Lake Reservoir	Modoc	41°50′59″N 121°10′14″W	527,000	0.650	Lost River	Clear Lake Dam	
Millerton Lake	Fresno, Madera	36°59′51″N 119°41′36″W	520,500	0.642	San Joaquin River	Friant Dam	
Camanche Reservoir	San Joaquin, Amador, Calaveras	38°13′26″N 120°58′04″W	431,000	0.532	Mokelumne River	Camanche Dam	
Lake Sonoma	Sonoma	38°43′05″N 123°00′34″W	381,000	0.470	Dry Creek	Warm Springs Dam	
Lake Nacimiento	San Luis Obispo	35°44′40″N 120°54′14″W	378,480	0.467	Nacimiento River	Nacimiento Dam	
Hetch Hetchy Reservoir	Tuolumne	37°56′21″N 119°43′32″W	360,000	0.444	Tuolumne River	O'Shaughnessy Dam	
Lake San Antonio	Monterey	35°52′13″N 121°00′19″W	335,000	0.413	San Antonio River	San Antonio Dam	
Castaic Lake	Los Angeles	34°31′12″N 118°36′23″W	323,700	0.399	Castaic Creek‡ (Note: Castaic Lake receives most of its water from the West Branch California Aqueduct.)	Castaic Dam	
New Hogan Lake	Calaveras	38°09′03″N 120°48′47″W	317,000	0.391	Calaveras River	New Hogan Dam	
Prado Flood Control Basin (Note: The reservoir behind Prado Dam is usually empty or close to empty because its primary purpose is flood control. Typical wet season storage is only about 20,000 to 45,000 acre-feet (0.025 to 0.056 km^{3}).)	Riverside	33°54′33″N 117°37′07″W	314,400	0.389	Santa Ana River	Prado Dam	
Clear Lake (Note: Clear Lake is a natural lake raised by Cache Creek Dam.)	Lake	39°03′42″N 122°49′38″W	313,000	0.386	Cache Creek	Cache Creek Dam	
Indian Valley Reservoir	Lake	39°07′31″N 122°32′34″W	300,600	0.371	North Fork Cache Creek	Indian Valley Dam	
Cherry Lake	Tuolumne	38°00′20″N 119°54′25″W	274,300	0.338	Cherry Creek	Cherry Valley Dam	
Lake Casitas	Ventura	34°23′09″N 119°20′08″W	254,000	0.313	Coyote Creek‡ (Note: Lake Casitas is fed by Coyote Creek and water diverted from the Ventura River, which Coyote Creek later flows into.)	Casitas Dam	
San Vicente Reservoir	San Diego	32°55′51″N 116°54′22″W	242,000	0.298	San Vicente Creek‡ (Note: Most water supplied from the First San Diego Aqueduct.)	San Vicente Dam	
Whiskeytown Lake	Shasta	40°37′41″N 122°33′51″W	241,100	0.297	Clear Creek‡ (Note: Clear Creek provides a significant portion of the reservoir inflow, but more water enters via the Clear Creek Tunnel, which diverts water from the Trinity River.)	Whiskeytown Dam	
Union Valley Reservoir	El Dorado	38°52′35″N 120°24′00″W	230,000	0.284	Silver Creek‡ (Note: Most of the water supplying the reservoir is diverted from the Middle Fork American River through penstocks for power generation.)	Union Valley Dam	
Stampede Reservoir	Sierra	39°28′38″N 120°08′26″W	226,500	0.279	Little Truckee River	Stampede Dam	
Twitchell Reservoir	Santa Barbara, San Luis Obispo	35°00′44″N 120°18′25″W	224,300	0.277	Cuyama River	Twitchell Dam	
Pardee Reservoir	Amador, Calaveras	38°15′27″N 120°51′01″W	209,950	0.259	Mokelumne River	Pardee Dam	
Hell Hole Reservoir	Placer	39°03′33″N 120°24′35″W	208,400	0.257	Rubicon River	Hell Hole Dam	
Lake Cachuma	Santa Barbara	34°35′12″N 119°58′52″W	205,000	0.253	Santa Ynez River	Bradbury Dam	
New Spicer Meadow Reservoir	Alpine, Tuolumne	38°24′26″N 119°57′46″W	190,000	0.234	Highland Creek	New Spicer Meadow Dam	
Lake Kaweah	Tulare	36°24′19″N 118°58′22″W	185,600	0.229	Kaweah River	Terminus Dam	
Los Vaqueros Reservoir	Contra Costa	37°49′09″N 121°44′04″W	160,000	0.197	Kellogg Creek	Los Vaqueros Dam	
Black Butte Lake	Glenn, Tehama	39°47′28″N 122°21′51″W	143,700	0.177	Stony Creek	Black Butte Dam	
Salt Springs Reservoir	Amador, Calaveras	38°29′50″N 120°10′56″W	141,900	0.175	Mokelumne River	Salt Springs Dam	
French Meadows Reservoir	Placer	39°06′53″N 120°26′23″W	136,400	0.168	Middle Fork American River	L.L. Anderson Dam	
Shaver Lake	Fresno	37°07′33″N 119°17′26″W	135,283	0.167	Stevenson Creek	Shaver Lake Dam	
Lake Perris	Riverside	33°51′21″N 117°10′36″W	131,452	0.162	N/A	Perris Dam	
Lake Thomas A. Edison	Fresno	37°22′58″N 118°58′34″W	125,000	0.154	Mono Creek	Vermilion Valley Dam	
Courtright Reservoir	Fresno	37°06′10″N 118°58′32″W	123,300	0.152	Helms Creek	Courtright Dam	
Mammoth Pool Reservoir	Fresno	37°19′50″N 119°19′15″W	123,000	0.152	San Joaquin River	Mammoth Pool Dam	
Lake Mendocino	Mendocino	39°12′56″N 123°10′24″W	122,400	0.151	Russian River	Coyote Valley Dam	
Wishon Reservoir	Fresno	37°01′04″N 118°57′47″W	118,000	0.146	North Fork Kings River	Wishon Dam	
Camp Far West Reservoir	Yuba	39°01′54″N 121°17′12″W	104,500	0.129	Bear River	Camp Far West Dam	
Bucks Lake	Plumas	39°52′56″N 121°09′52″W	103,000	0.127	Bucks Creek	Bucks Storage Dam	
Calaveras Reservoir	Alameda, Santa Clara	37°28′29″N 121°49′10″W	100,000	0.123	Calaveras Creek	Calaveras Dam	

== See also ==
- List of dams and reservoirs in California
- List of lakes in California
- List of largest reservoirs in the United States
- Water in California
- California State Water Project
