= Camanche Reservoir =

Reservoir in California, United States

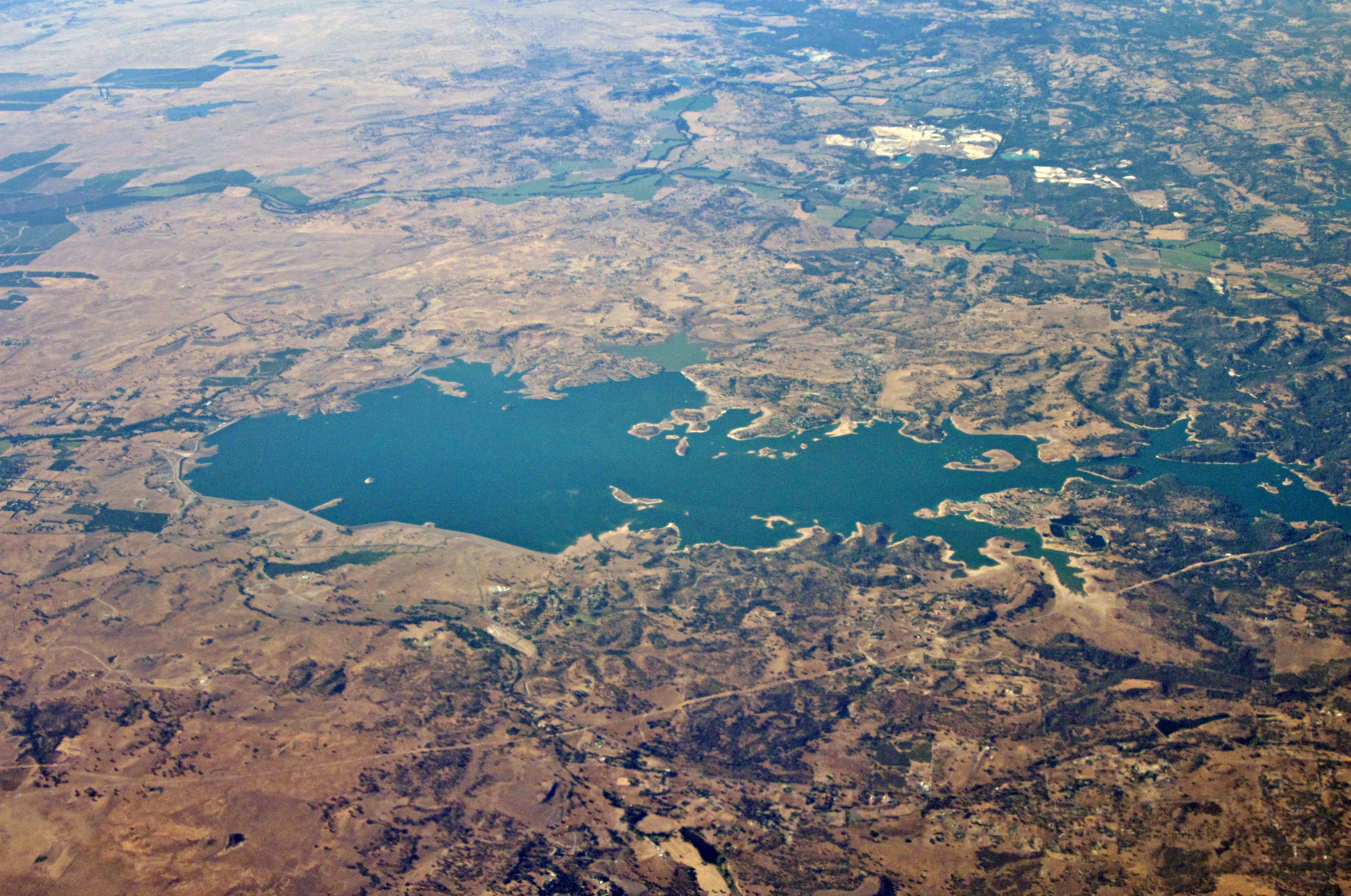
- Camanche Reservoir as viewed from a passing airliner

- Location within California
- Location: Amador, Calaveras and San Joaquin counties
- Coordinates: 38°13′25″N 121°00′00″W
- Type: reservoir
- Primary outflows: Mokelumne River
- Catchment area: 619 square miles (1,600 km^{2})
- Basin countries: United States
- Max. length: 5 miles (8.0 km)
- Max. width: 3 miles (4.8 km)
- Surface area: 7,700 acres (3,100 ha)
- Max. depth: 150 feet (46 m)
- Water volume: 417,120 acre-feet (514,510,000 m^{3})
- Shore length^{1}: 53 miles (85 km)
- Surface elevation: 135 ft (41 m)
- ^{1} Shore length is not a well-defined measure.

Camanche Reservoir is an artificial lake in the San Joaquin Valley in California in the United States, at the juncture of Amador, Calaveras, and San Joaquin counties, and is fed by the Mokelumne River. Its waters are impounded by Camanche Dam, which was completed in 1963. Camanche Reservoir is a source of water for industrial and municipal purposes and also provides flood control.

The lake was named after the former town of Camanche that now lies beneath its waters. The lake has also been called Camanche Lake and Lake Camanche. Camanche Reservoir has recreation areas throughout the lake, which are mainly located on the North and South shores.

== North Shore ==
Camanche Reservoir North Shore is located in Amador County. It contains a population of approximately 1,000 people. The North Shore hosts some of the recreation features of Camanche Reservoir, including close to 800 campsites. The North Shore also allows RV camping as well as tent camping. There is a North Shore Marina Store located here including a small café.

== South Shore ==
Camanche Reservoir South Shore also hosts a large portion of Lake Camanche's recreation features and amenities. The South Shore includes a store located in the middle of the recreation area. It also contains the two RV parks which offer full hook-ups, (water, electric, and sewer) and an amphitheater where numerous events are held.

== Hydrology ==
The lake is fed by the headwaters of the Mokelumne River, including tributaries such as Rabbit Creek and Camanche Creek. The water entering Camanche Reservoir is influenced by the amount of water released from the Pardee Dam upstream. Camanche reservoir typically fills to capacity prior to summer months. This occurs from the melting of snowpack during the months of May–July (melt flow season) which increases the amount of water flowing through the Mokelumne River. During summer months, Camanche Reservoir releases water continuously. This allows for constant reliable downstream irrigation.

The Camanche Reservoir has the ability to hold 417,120 acre-feet (AF) of water at maximum capacity. Severe drought experienced in California led to the water levels declining from the period of 2011 to 2015. The reservoir had the lowest water level since being filled in August, 2015, with the water volume in the reservoir decreasing to 81,940 AF, approximately 19.6% of the reservoirs maximum capacity. Water levels increased through the winter months of 2015-2016 reaching 240,340 AF during April, 2016. Record precipitation in Northern California during the late storm season of 2017 brought relief. Through the 2024 storm season, Lake Camanche, like most reservoirs in California at the time, remained above historical levels, with no expected drought conditions to worsen through 2026.

Ground water sources surrounding the reservoir typically flow in similar patterns to the surface streams. Due to the geology of the area the ground water sources typically do not exceed depths of 300 feet and rarely produce water near 600 feet.

== Mokelumne River Fish Hatchery ==
With the creation of several reservoirs along the Mokelumne River, many populations of fish species were impacted. Because of this, the Mokelumne River Fish Hatchery was created downriver of the Camanche Reservoir. This hatchery was built in 1963 to help recover the fish spawning levels that traditionally existed in the river. The fish hatchery was remodeled and updated in 2002. This remodeling involved enlarging the rearing space located at the site to allow for the promotion of fish health and to increase the survival rates of the fish raised at the site. These improvements to the facility have allowed for the number of returning salmon to increase by 3,028 from 1998 to 2003. There are two main species that are raised at the Mokelumne River Hatchery: the Chinook salmon and the Steelhead trout.

== Biodiversity ==
Camanche reservoir contains a variety of fish species which attracts many people who enjoy fishing. The reservoir has species of bass, trout, crappie, and catfish, among other species.

There are also a variety of bird species located near the reservoir. Birdwatching is a part of the recreation at Camanche Reservoir and self-guided bird walks are allowed as well as bird watching tours. Bird species include various duck species, great egrets, multiple woodpecker species, turkey vultures, and multiple sparrow species. There is also a large amount of songbird species that live in the surrounding area near the reservoir.

There are also a variety of mammalian species located on or near the reservoir. Near Camanche Reservoir small mammal species such as squirrels and rodents are abundant and can be seen from various recreation areas. Deer are also known to frequent the area near Camanche Reservoir. Predators such as bobcats exists near Lake Camanche but are rarely spotted.

There are a variety of plant species located in the surrounding area, with vegetation akin to a woodland savanna, more specifically characterized as a California oak woodland community. These plant communities thrive in environments with hot dry periods and periodic fires. The fires have been suppressed in present times due to human development and populations in the surrounding area. The area is dominated by oak species, like the valley oak and blue oak. These species tend to grow in a spread fashion opposed to clumping together. There are a variety of plant species that grow in the understory of the oak trees, including various grasses, herbs, and shrubs. Many of these plants are native to California, but there are many introduced grasses as well.

== Climate ==
Camanche Reservoir is located in what is known as a Mediterranean Climate. Characteristics of the climate near Camanche Reservoir include relatively low annual rainfall, warm to hot summers, and cool mild winters. The majority of the annual precipitation is in the form of rain, and falls mainly during the winter months. The area has very high sun intensities during the summer months and relatively low humidity.

== Geology ==
The geology near Camanche Reservoir varies between different soil types and slope gradients. The soil ranges from sandy loams, loams, and rock lands. Loam soil types are typically sandy in texture and composition and also contain portions of silt and clay. They are typically made up of 40 percent sand, 40 percent silt, and 20 percent clay. Sandy loams contain a higher concentration of sand compared to other loams. The slope varies from a 2% gradient up to a 45% gradient. Due to the upland areas near the reservoir, the rock land soil type is dominant. These soil types interact with the ground water located near the reservoir by influencing surface water runoff and ground water recharge. The structural geology of the area has experienced changes in the past due to plate tectonics, influencing the layout and shape of the surrounding land.

== History ==
The communities of Camanche, Lancha Plana, and Poverty Bar were inundated by the creation of this reservoir. The region was originally settled during the gold rush into three separate towns. As the gold rush slowed, these towns began to decrease in population. Settlers from Iowa named the largest remaining town “Camanche” after a town in Iowa. Camanche remained a small town, and was eventually evacuated by the East Bay Municipal Utility District to build the dam and reservoir that exists there today.

== Recreation ==
Recreational uses of the lake include boating, fishing and waterskiing. The California Office of Environmental Health Hazard Assessment released an advisory statement regarding eating fish caught from this reservoir based on the mercury level.

Many shaded day-use and picnic sites can be found throughout the Camanche Recreation Area. These sites are popular for families and groups wanting to spend a day at the lake. Many of these sites offer immediate access to the lake's amenities. Scenic hiking and equestrian trails travel around the north and south shores. Each trail goes along rolling hills and through several oak groves that offer intermittent shade. A trail use permit is required and may be purchased at either gate. Tennis, basketball and volleyball courts are located on both shores as are playgrounds for children.

There are over 500 campsites and 200 RV locations around the reservoir. Many campsites include facilities such as bathrooms, tables, heated showers, laundry facilities and barbeques. These sites are available year-round. Cottage and motel rooms are also available for those who do not want stay in tents. Camanche Reservoir is known for bass and trout fishing and has more than 50,000 pounds of trout stocked in the reservoir each year. State fishing licenses are required for anyone over the age of 16, and there is a $7.75 fishing fee. Boat rentals are also available at the reservoir, as well as 8-lane boat launches at each shore. Any boat entering the reservoir is subject to inspection to help prevent the spread of invasive quagga mussels. An amphitheater is also located at the reservoir which has various events. Stores are located at each marina for any food needs. There is also the North Shore Café and the South Shore Marina Grill for visitors to purchase food or drinks. Dogs are allowed at the reservoir for a small fee and must remain on leashes throughout the visit.

Day Use Fees
Activity	Fee ($)
Fishing Access	7.75
Boat Launching	17
Car/Boat Fee	17
Car	12.5
Car (after 3:00PM)	10
Motor Bike	12.5
Dog	5.5
Mini Bus (10-20 passengers)	19
Bus (21 or more passengers)	36

Camping Rates
Activity	Fee ($)
1 Night	28
1 Night (October- April Fri-Sun)	16
1 Night (October- April Mon-Thurs)	8
1 Week (May–September)	150
1 Week (August–April)	80
2 Week (May–September)	275
2 Week (August–April)	160
Second Car per night	12
Second Car per week	70

== See also ==
- Camanche Village, California
- Camanche North Shore, California
- List of lakes in California
- List of dams and reservoirs in California
- List of largest reservoirs of California
- Pardee Dam
