= Calaveras Dome =

Coordinates: 38°29′16″N 120°13′38″W

Calaveras Dome is a Granite dome in Northern California best known as a rock climbing venue. The dome is located close to the Salt Springs Reservoir and rises 1,200 ft (370 m) above the Lower Mokelumne River It has been a popular destination for climbers since the early 1970s. Several dedicated climbers actively developed new routes. Jay Smith, Jeff Altenburg, Paul Crawford, Bob Pinkney, and several others pushed the area into a new realm. Today this is a visited area with climbers from around the world visiting this remote and still un-crowded and beautiful area.
