= Mokelumne Aqueduct =

Aqueduct connecting the Mokelumne River in California to the East Bay

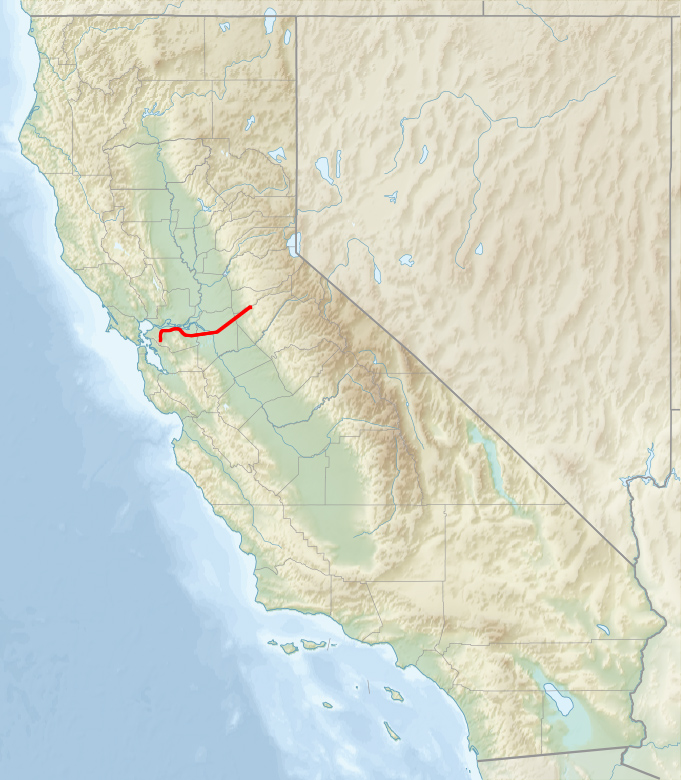
- Location of the Mokelumne Aqueduct in California
- Coordinates: 37°54′N 121°30′W
- Begins: Pardee Reservoir, Amador/Calaveras Counties
- Ends: near Walnut Creek, Contra Costa County
- Maintained by: East Bay Municipal Utility District

Characteristics
- Total length: 95 mi (153 km)
- First section diameter: 61 in (1.5 m)
- Second section diameter: 67 in (1.7 m)
- Third section diameter: 87 in (2.2 m)
- Capacity: 700 cu ft/s (20 m^{3}/s)

History
- Construction start: 1926
- Opened: 1929 (Aqueduct No. 1); 1949 (No. 2); 1963 (No. 3)

Location
- Interactive map of Mokelumne Aqueduct

The Mokelumne Aqueduct is a 95-mile (153 km) water conveyance system in central California, United States. The aqueduct is supplied by the Mokelumne River and provides water to 35 municipalities in the East Bay in the San Francisco Bay Area. The aqueduct and the associated dams, pipelines, treatment plants and hydroelectric system are owned and operated by the East Bay Municipal Utility District (EBMUD) and provide over 90 percent of the water used by the agency.

The aqueduct is the sole water supply for about 1.4 million people in the East Bay. Under present water rights agreements, EBMUD can withdraw up to 325 million gallons (1,230,000 m^{3}) per day, or 364,000 acre-feet (0.449 km^{3}) per year, from the Mokelumne River. In addition, up to 98 million gallons (371,000 m^{3}) per day or 110,000 acre-feet (0.14 km^{3}) per year can be supplied via a branch from the Sacramento River. However, this supply is expected only to be used in the driest 35% of years.

== History ==
In the early 20th century, due to a lack of reliable local water, Bay Area cities began to look to rivers in the Sierra Nevada, about 100 miles (160 km) east, as a potential new source. Although the city of San Francisco was already extending an aqueduct to the Tuolumne River, East Bay communities wanted to build an independent water system, fearing future "hegemony" of the water system by San Francisco. In 1923, the EBMUD was organized and in 1924 acquired water rights to the Mokelumne River, a major tributary in the San Joaquin River system. On November 4, 1924, residents approved $39 million (equivalent to $564 million in 2025) in bonds to finance the project.

Construction began in 1926 and by 1929, the 345-foot (105 m) high, concrete arch Pardee Dam and the First Mokelumne Aqueduct, consisting of a single pipeline, were completed. The first deliveries to the Bay Area were made on June 23, 1929. At the time of completion, Pardee Dam was the tallest in the world (this record was surpassed one year later by Diablo Dam in Washington State). In 1949, a second pipeline was built and in 1963 the third pipeline was constructed, bringing the aqueduct to its present capacity. In 1964, the second major dam of the project, Camanche Dam, was completed below Pardee.

In 1970, EBMUD signed a contract with the U.S. Bureau of Reclamation (USBR) for supplemental water from the Folsom South Canal, which draws water from the American River near Sacramento. The USBR supply was delayed for nearly 40 years in part due to minimum flow requirements in the American River to protect salmon and steelhead populations. The Folsom South Canal Connection (FSCC), which links the two waterways, was finally completed in 2009.

== Specifications ==
The aqueduct begins at Pardee Reservoir, which is formed by Pardee Dam on the Mokelumne River. The reservoir has a capacity of 197,950 acre-feet (0.24417 km^{3}), or about a 10-month supply. Camanche Reservoir, located directly below Pardee, has a storage capacity of 417,120 acre-feet (0.51451 km^{3}) – twice the size of Pardee – but is not directly linked to the aqueduct. However, Camanche allows for greater diversions into the aqueduct by storing winter floodwaters spilled from Pardee. During the dry season, water is released from Camanche in order to satisfy local water-rights holders, eliminating the need to draw water from Pardee.

The aqueduct travels southwest for 95 miles (153 km) through the western foothills of the Sierra Nevada and then west across the Central Valley along the Calaveras River before crossing the Sacramento–San Joaquin River Delta. Near Lodi, the aqueduct is joined by an extension of the Folsom South Canal, which supplements the Mokelumne River supply. Once the water reaches the Berkeley Hills above the East Bay, it is channeled into a complex distribution system consisting of six terminal reservoirs (Briones, Chabot, Lafayette, San Pablo and Upper San Leandro) with a combined storage capacity of 155,150 acre-feet (0.19137 km^{3}). The water is treated at the San Pablo, Sobrante and Upper San Leandro Treatment Plants before passing through the Claremont Tunnel, which emerges on the western side of the range between Berkeley and Oakland. Water not immediately put into the municipal system is stored in the reservoirs for use in times of low delivery or drought.

Most of the aqueduct consists of three separate buried steel pipelines, although there are also some aboveground segments. The pipelines, also known as Aqueducts No. 1, 2 and 3, have diameters of 61 inches (1.5 m), 67 inches (1.7 m) and 87 inches (2.2 m), respectively. Aside from the main facilities, the distribution system includes 4,000 miles (6,400 km) of pipes, 125 pump plants, and 168 local reservoirs/storage tanks.

== Issues ==
The aqueduct is located in a seismically active zone and is considered vulnerable to earthquakes, especially the 15-mile (24 km) stretch where it crosses the Sacramento–San Joaquin Delta, where an earthquake or storm-induced levee failure could damage the pipelines or any of three major river crossings here. A large earthquake (100 year return period or more) could put the aqueduct out of service from 18 months to three years, depending on the extent of the damage. Levee failures in 1980 and 2004 (not caused by earthquakes) on Jones Tract have threatened the aqueduct. An aqueduct joint at the crossing of the Middle River also failed in 1992, nearly causing a washout of the levee. The aqueduct was shut down in time before an actual levee breach could occur.

Because Pardee Reservoir is relatively small among California reservoirs, EBMUD has pursued to raise Pardee Dam to a height of 400 feet (120 m). This would expand the reservoir surface by 33 to 46 feet (10 to 14 m). The enlarged reservoir would cover 3,400 acres (1,400 ha), an increase of 62 percent, and the capacity would be about 300,000 acre-feet (0.37 km^{3}), a roughly 50 percent increase. It would allow for more water to be provided during the dry season that would otherwise have been spilled over the dam during the winter. This project would have flooded between 2 and 3 miles (3.2 and 4.8 km) of the Mokelumne River. Due to environmental concerns, the project was shelved in 2011.

== See also ==
- Hetch Hetchy Project
- Water in California
