= Mokelumne River Fish Hatchery =

Coordinates: 38°13′31″N 121°01′35″W

The Mokelumne River River Fish Hatchery is a fish hatchery in San Joaquin County, California, built in 1963 by the East Bay Municipal Utility District (EBMUD).

== History ==
The hatchery was built in 1963 to offset the loss of fish spawning habitat due to the construction of Camanche Dam.

From 1987 to 1992, there was a drought in the area. Low flows and a series of fish kills reduced the Mokelumne River steelhead run during the 1980s.

In response, EBMUD implemented several programs to improve water quality, flow regimes, and physical habitat in the lower Mokelumne River. The hatchery was remodeled in July 2002, enlarging the rearing space to promote fish health and fish survival rates while also making hatchery operations more efficient.

Since then, the Lower Mokelumme River Fishery Resource has thrived, as evidenced by counts of fall-run Chinook salmon escapement or returning salmon. Returning salmon increased by 3,028 from 1998 to 2003.

== Access ==
The hatchery is owned by EBUMD and operated by the California Department of Fish and Game and is open every day (including holidays) from 7:00 am to 3:00;pm.

It is located in northeast San Joaquin County, California at the base of the Camanche Dam and is reached by taking McIntire Road north from State Route 12.

A limited number of educational tours are provided for schools and other organized groups. The topics covered by the tour are: the biology of Chinook salmon and Steelhead trout, the purpose and operations of the hatchery, and the importance of conserving river watersheds. Casual visitors may take a self-guided tour.

The hatchery is also a popular destination for fishing, wildlife watching, and hiking.

All trails at the hatchery are paved and wheelchair accessible.
