= Camanche Village, California =

Camanche Village
- Census-designated place
- Location of Camanche Village in Amador County, California.

- Location in California
- Coordinates: 38°16′12″N 120°58′24″W
- Country: United States
- State: California
- County: Amador

Area
  - Total: 5.45 sq mi (14.12 km^{2})
  - Land: 5.44 sq mi (14.08 km^{2})
  - Water: 0.015 sq mi (0.04 km^{2}) 0.28%
- Elevation: 276 ft (84 m)

Population (2020)
  - Total: 964
  - Density: 177.3/sq mi (68.45/km^{2})
- FIPS code: 06-10044

Camanche Village is a census-designated place in Amador County, California, United States. It lies at an elevation of 276 feet (84 m). As of the 2020 census, Camanche Village had a population of 964.

== Demographics ==
Historical population
Census	Pop.	Note	%±
2010	847		—
2020	964		13.8%
U.S. Decennial Census; 1860–1870 1880-1890; 1900 1910 1920; 1930 1940 1950; 1960 1970 1980; 1990 2000 2010

=== 2020 census ===
As of the 2020 census, Camanche Village had a population of 964. The population density was 177.3 inhabitants per square mile (68.5/km^{2}). The median age was 45.5 years. 25.4% of residents were under the age of 18, 5.2% aged 18 to 24, 18.6% aged 25 to 44, 34.0% aged 45 to 64, and 16.8% were 65 years of age or older. For every 100 females there were 94.0 males, and for every 100 females age 18 and over there were 84.8 males age 18 and over.

0.0% of residents lived in urban areas, while 100.0% lived in rural areas.

There were 347 households in Camanche Village, of which 38.6% had children under the age of 18 living in them. Of all households, 65.1% were married-couple households, 5.8% were cohabiting couple households, 16.1% were households with a male householder and no spouse or partner present, and 13.0% were households with a female householder and no spouse or partner present. About 17.6% of all households were made up of individuals and 9.5% had someone living alone who was 65 years of age or older. The average household size was 2.78. There were 270 families (77.8% of all households).

There were 357 housing units at an average density of 65.7 units per square mile (25.4 units/km^{2}), of which 2.8% were vacant. The homeowner vacancy rate was 1.0% and the rental vacancy rate was 0.0%. Of occupied units, 85.0% were owner-occupied, and 15.0% were occupied by renters.

Racial composition as of the 2020 census
Race	Number	Percent
White	772	80.1%
Black or African American	7	0.7%
American Indian and Alaska Native	12	1.2%
Asian	13	1.3%
Native Hawaiian and Other Pacific Islander	13	1.3%
Some other race	48	5.0%
Two or more races	99	10.3%
Hispanic or Latino (of any race)	152	15.8%

=== 2010 census ===
Camanche Village first appeared as a census designated place in the 2010 U.S. census.

== See also ==
- Camanche Dam
- Camanche Reservoir
