= Foothill Conservancy =

Nonprofit organization based in California, United States

On July 21, 2000, Foothill Conservancy, a nonprofit organization based in Amador County, California, was among the parties signing the historic settlement agreement with PG&E that formed the basis for a new 30-year operating license for the Mokelumne River Project. Every nonfederal hydroelectric project in the country operates under license from the Federal Energy Regulatory Commission (FERC). As a project's license expires, the licensee begins a relicensing process that generally leads to a new license with updated terms. The new license lasts 30 to 50 years.

The relicensing of PG&E's Mokelumne River Project (Project 137), which began in 1972, was the longest such process in FERC history. Meanwhile, PG&E had been running its project, which stretches from Blue Lakes west to Electra Powerhouse, on annual licenses with few requirements for protecting the health of the river or providing river recreation.

The 101-page settlement addresses the ecological and recreation effects of stream flows in all of the river reaches and creeks affected by the project. It balances the needs of the environment, recreation, and power generation. Other parties to the settlement are the California Department of Fish and Game, California Department of Boating and Waterways, US Fish and Wildlife Service, US Forest Service, Friends of the River, Bureau of Land Management, Natural Heritage Institute, and American Whitewater.

The settlement led to the first removal of a PG&E dam in the Sierra Nevada (U.S.) in modern history.

The Foothill Conservancy successfully secured California Wild and Scenic River designation for 37 miles of the North Fork and main Mokelumne River with the passage of Senate Bill 854 in 2018. The designation bars new dams and major diversions on the river from just below Salt Springs Reservoir to just upstream of Pardee Reservoir. Earlier, the Conservancy laid the groundwork for that designation by working for the passage of Assembly Bill 142 in 2015. That legislation mandated a state wild and scenic river study of the Mokelumne River and provided interim protections from new dams and diversions.
