= Bear River (Mokelumne River tributary) =

River in the Sierra Nevada, California

Coordinates: 38.47602°N 120.29714°W

The Bear River is a 19.3-mile-long (31.1 km) river in the Sierra Nevada in California. It is a tributary of the Mokelumne River. The river and its watershed are entirely in El Dorado National Forest.

The river begins as two forks several miles south of Kirkwood. The forks travel roughly southwest and merge just before the river enters Upper Bear River Reservoir. Immediately downstream of the reservoir is Lower Bear River Reservoir. Below the reservoir, the river continues southwest until it meets the Mokelumne River. The reservoirs on the Bear River are owned by Pacific Gas and Electric Company as part of the Mokelumne Hydroelectric Project.
