= Lafayette Reservoir =

Water storage reservoir in California

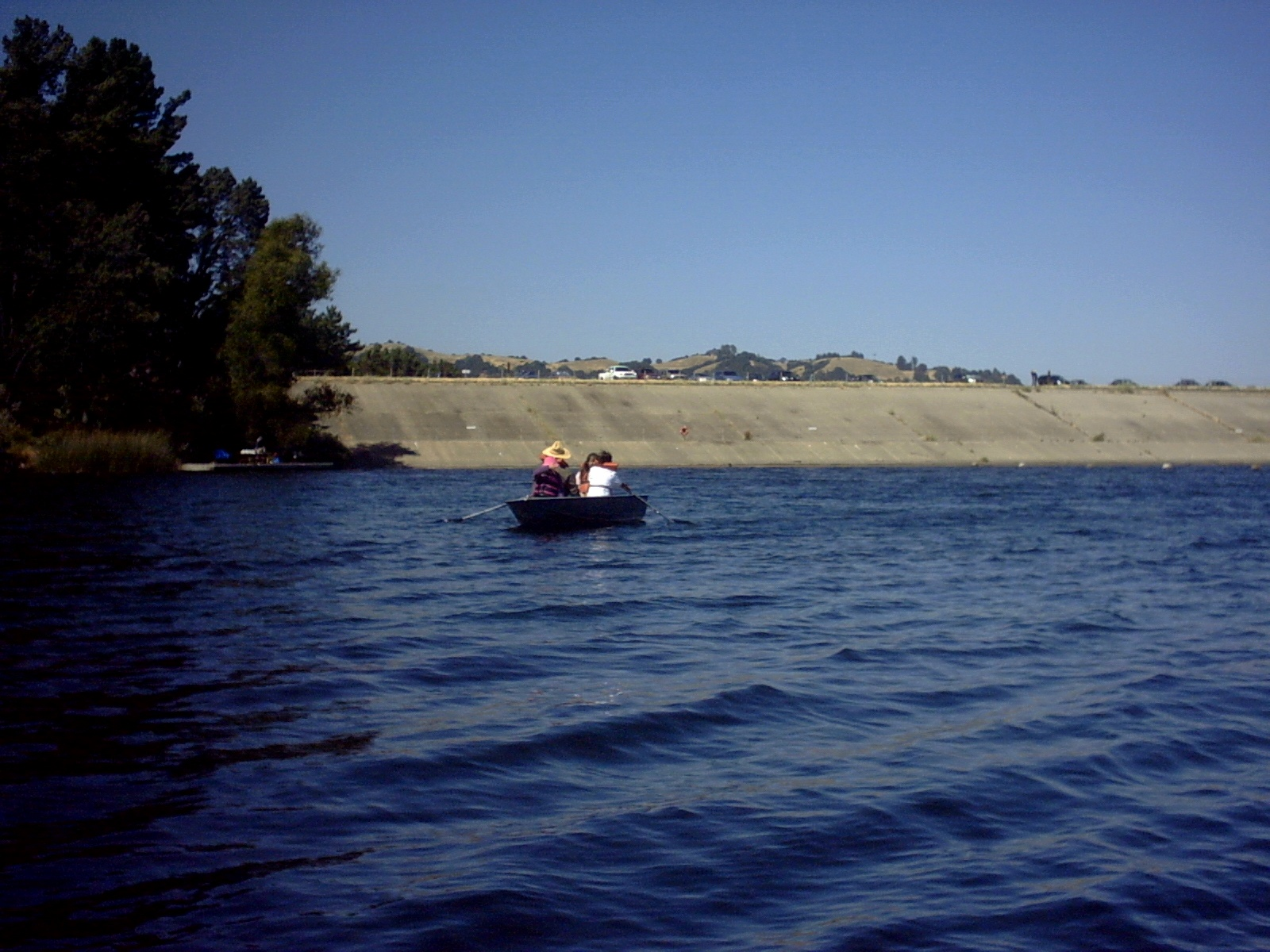
- Lafayette Reservoir

- Location within California Location within the United States
- Coordinates: 37°53′04″N 122°08′20″W
- Managing agency: East Bay Municipal Utility District (EBMUD)
- Built: 1933
- Surface area: 126 acres (51 ha)
- Water volume: 1.4 billion US gallons (5,300,000 m^{3})
- Settlements: Lafayette and Orinda, California

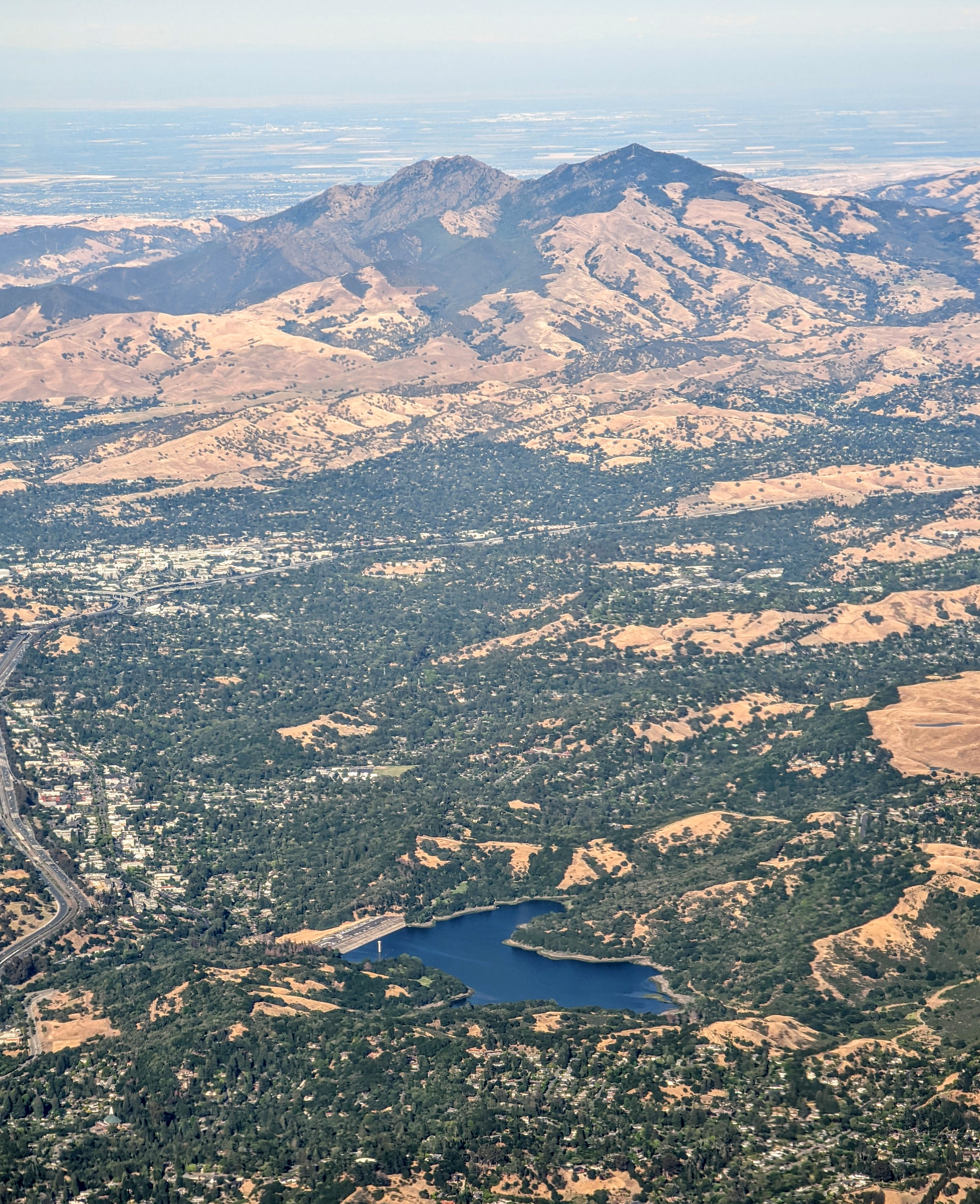
Aerial view with Mount Diablo

The Lafayette Reservoir is an open-cut human-made terminal water storage reservoir owned and operated by the East Bay Municipal Utility District (EBMUD). Completed in 1933, it was intended solely as a standby water supply for EBMUD customers. (Note: Water is supplied to the reservoir as needed by EBMUD through its Mokelumne Aqueduct.) EBMUD opened the reservoir for public recreation in 1966. It is located off California State Route 24 and a mile from the Lafayette BART station, in Contra Costa County, California, United States. This all-year, day-use area is ideal for hiking, jogging, fishing, boating and picnicking. The reservoir is on the Lafayette-Orinda border. The reservoir is on a 925-acre (3.74 km^{2}) site and holds 1.4 billion US gallons (5,300,000 m^{3})

== History ==
Construction of Lafayette Reservoir began in 1928, as an earth-filled structure for the dam. The fill was installed very rapidly. (Note: One source called this "a record rate" of 9,000 cubic yards (6,900 m^{3}) per day.) This was apparently too fast for the clay foundation, because as the concrete apron was being poured, the foundation began to move downhill. The dam reportedly settled, displacing the structure 200 yards (180 m) from the toe of the dam 26 feet (7.9 m) between September 17 and 21.

EBMUD engineers had to quickly redesign the project, first by reducing the reservoir capacity to one-third of its original design. Then they delayed further construction by three years, to see whether more settling would occur. The design change was apparently satisfactory, and the dam was completed in 1933.

An outlet tower built at the southwestern corner of the lake was left unchanged when the dam was redesigned, which is why the tower is excessively tall for its intended use. The top is accessible only by scaling metal rungs embedded in its side. Therefore, the tiny observation booth is almost always deserted, and the antique doors have turned green from oxidation. As of 2018, EBMUD was faced with an expensive decision over whether to fix the historic outlet tower, or to save money by removing it.

During 1935, the Soil Conservation Service (SCS), a Federal New Deal program, started planting 5,000 Monterey pine seedlings at San Pablo Reservoir, many of which were to be used for soil stabilization on slopes around Lafayette and other EBMUD reservoirs. By 1940, the program had planted about 57,000 trees around all of EBMUD's reservoirs. After 80 years, the Monterey pines are close to the end of their life cycle, and some are being removed under a thinning program.

== Recreation ==
Rowboats and pedal boats can be rented. Private rowboats, canoes, kayaks and small sailboats are allowed if carried atop an auto (no gasoline engines).

The main trail around the reservoir is a 2.7-mile paved footpath named the Lakeside Trail; the 4.5-mile Rim Trail is a more challenging dirt hiking path through the surrounding hills.

Families, groups and companies can reserve picnic areas holding 50 or 200 people. Many individual tables and barbecues accommodate smaller groups. A children's fenced play area is available for younger visitors. The park has restrooms and a disabled-access fishing dock with adjacent parking.

The California Office of Environmental Health Hazard Assessment (OEHHA) has developed an advisory for Lafayette Reservoir because of mercury and PCBs found in fish caught there. The advisory provides safe eating advice for black bass, rainbow trout, channel catfish, and goldfish.

== See also ==
- East Bay Municipal Utility District
