= Claremont Tunnel =

Utility tunnel in Alameda County, California

- Location within Oakland, California Location within San Francisco Bay Area

Overview
- Coordinates: 37.8714°N 122.2202°W
- Status: Active

Operation
- Opened: 1929
- Owner: East Bay Municipal Utility District (EBMUD)
- Character: water tunnel

Technical
- Length: 18,065 feet (5,506 m) long
- Tunnel clearance: 9 feet (2.7 m) square

Claremont Tunnel, also known as the Claremont Water Tunnel, is a utility tunnel in Alameda County, in the U.S. state of California near the historic Claremont Hotel. The tunnel crosses the Hayward Fault and carries water for 800,000 EBMUD customers.

== History ==
The Claremont Tunnel was built in 1929.

After the Loma Prieta earthquake in 1989, EBMUD began studying the potential effect of a large seismic event along the Hayward Fault. In the worst-case scenario, slip along the fault would sever the tunnel, disrupting the water supply to approximately 50 to 70% (800,000) of EBMUD's customers for up to six months. In response, EBMUD approved a $189 million Seismic Improvement Plan in 1994, which included seismic upgrades to the Claremont Tunnel. Seismic upgrades began in 2004 and completed in 2007.

== Design ==
The original tunnel connects the EBMUD treatment plant in Orinda with the distribution system west of the Oakland Hills. It featured a bore 9 feet (2.7 m) square with a mostly unreinforced concrete lining 1-foot (0.30 m) thick. At peak capacity, the tunnel can deliver 175,000,000 US gallons per day (460,000 L/min).

The tunnel crosses the Hayward Fault at a nearly perpendicular angle 850 feet (260 m) from its western portal, and creep along the fault resulted in an offset of 13 inches (330 mm) by 2008. The maximum credible earthquake (magnitude 7.0) predicted in studies would cause an offset of 7.5 feet (2.3 m). For the seismic upgrade, a reinforced bypass tunnel was constructed across the Hayward Fault starting in 2004. The seismic upgrade also injected grout to improve contact between the 1929 concrete tunnel and the surrounding earth. For the bypass, first a 480-foot (150 m) access tunnel was bored into the fault zone. Next, the space for the 1,570-foot (480 m) long bypass tunnel was excavated using the New Austrian tunnelling method.

A bypass tunnel was used to avoid disrupting service through the main tunnel and to minimize cost and time. The bypass tunnel is 11 feet (3.4 m) in diameter, except for a reinforced section crossing the fault, where it takes on an oval cross-section 17 feet (5.2 m) wide for a length of 108 feet (33 m). In the reinforced section, the concrete liner of the tunnel is 2 feet (0.61 m) thick, instead of the 1-foot (0.30 m) thickness elsewhere in the bypass tunnel. The reinforced section was excavated by first boring two drifts to either side of the planned section. The space between the two drifts was excavated, and then the drifts were filled with concrete so that if the reinforced section breaks, the water will not wash out the dirt surrounding the tunnel.

In the reinforced section, the reinforcement is weakened every 11 feet (3.4 m) along its length to allow the reinforced section to shear predictably in the event of a slip along the fault. The reinforced section is fitted with a steel carrier pipe 3 inches (76 mm) thick with a 6 feet (1.8 m) inner diameter, capable of delivering 130,000,000 US gallons per day (340,000 L/min). Up to an 8.5 feet (2.6 m) offset can be accommodated without breaking the pipe or losing water delivery. The bypass tunnel was designed by Jacobs Associates for EBMUD, and cost $38 million. It went into service on May 30, 2007.
