= Bear River Dam =

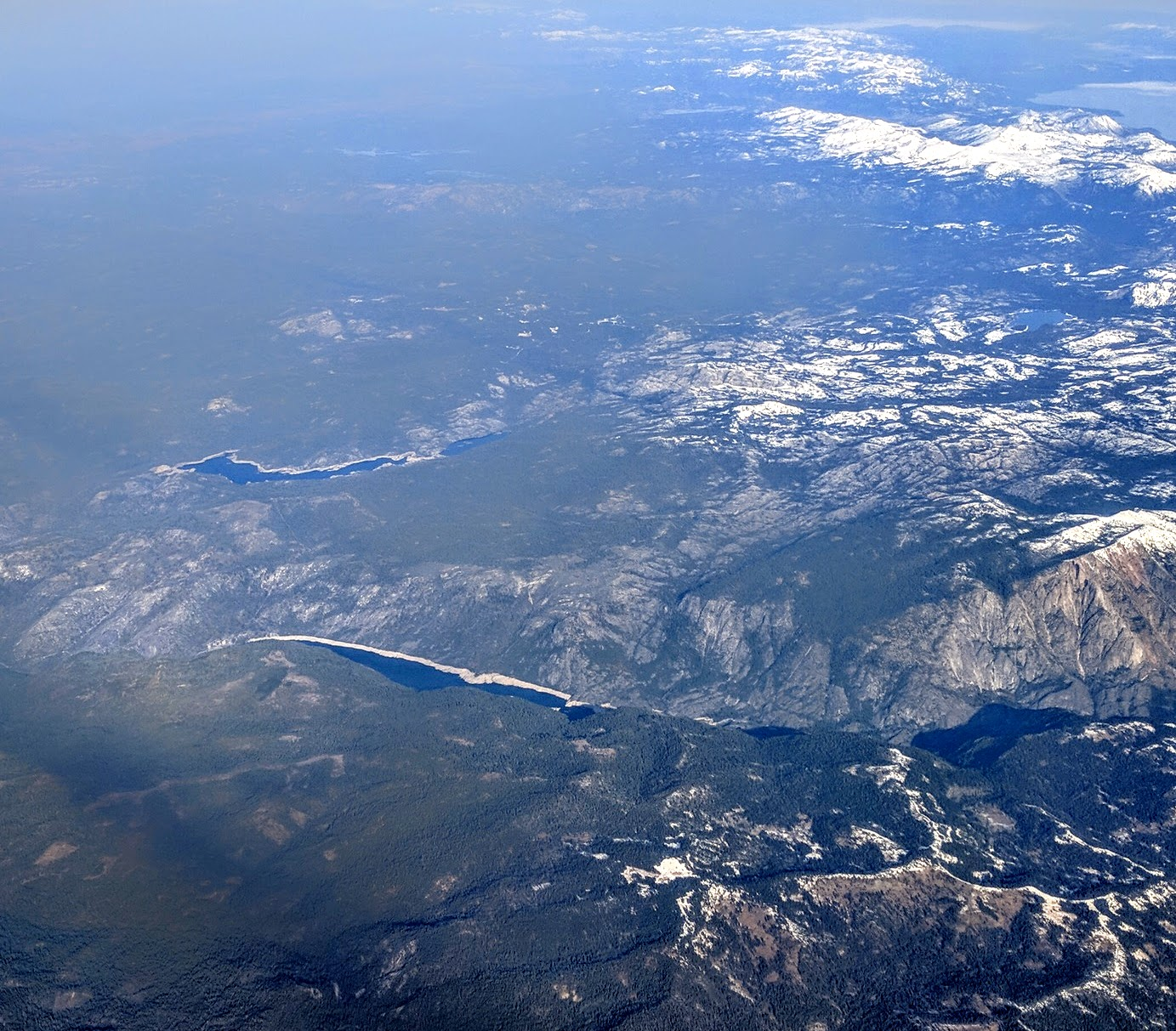
- The Salt Springs Reservoir (below), Lower Bear River Reservoir (above left), and Bear River Reservoir (above center) are visible in aerial view from the south, with Mokelumne Peak in the Mokelumne Wilderness at the far right. A portion of Lake Tahoe is visible at the upper right.

- Location within California
- Location: Amador County, California
- Coordinates: 38°33′28″N 120°12′58″W
- Type: Reservoir
- Built: 1900
- Surface area: 149 acres (60 ha)
- Max. depth: 83 ft (25 m)
- Water volume: 6,818 acre⋅ft (8,410,000 m^{3})

Bear River Dam (National ID # CA00379, also known as the Upper Bear River Dam) is a dam in Amador County, California, due east of Sacramento.

The rockfill dam was constructed in 1900 (126 years ago) with a height of 83 feet (25 m), and a length of 748 feet (228 m) at its crest. It impounds the Bear River for hydroelectric power generation and municipal water supply. It is owned and operated by Pacific Gas and Electric Company, the largest private owner of hydroelectric facilities in the United States, making it one of the company's 174 dams.

The reservoir it creates, Bear River Reservoir, has a normal water surface of 149 acres (60 ha) and has a maximum capacity of 6,818 acre-feet (8,410,000 m^{3}). Recreation includes fishing, swimming, and camping, however the Upper Bear River Reservoir can only be accessed by foot, and is mostly unused by the public.

The Lower Bear River Reservoir and its own dam lie immediately downstream and to the west, also owned by PG&E.

The dam is being examined as the upper pool in a 380–1,140 MW pumped-storage project with the Salt Springs Reservoir as the lower pool.

== See also ==
- List of dams and reservoirs in California
- List of lakes in California
