= East Bay Municipal Utility District =

Public utility district in California

Coordinates: 37.8°N 122.2°W

- EBMUD
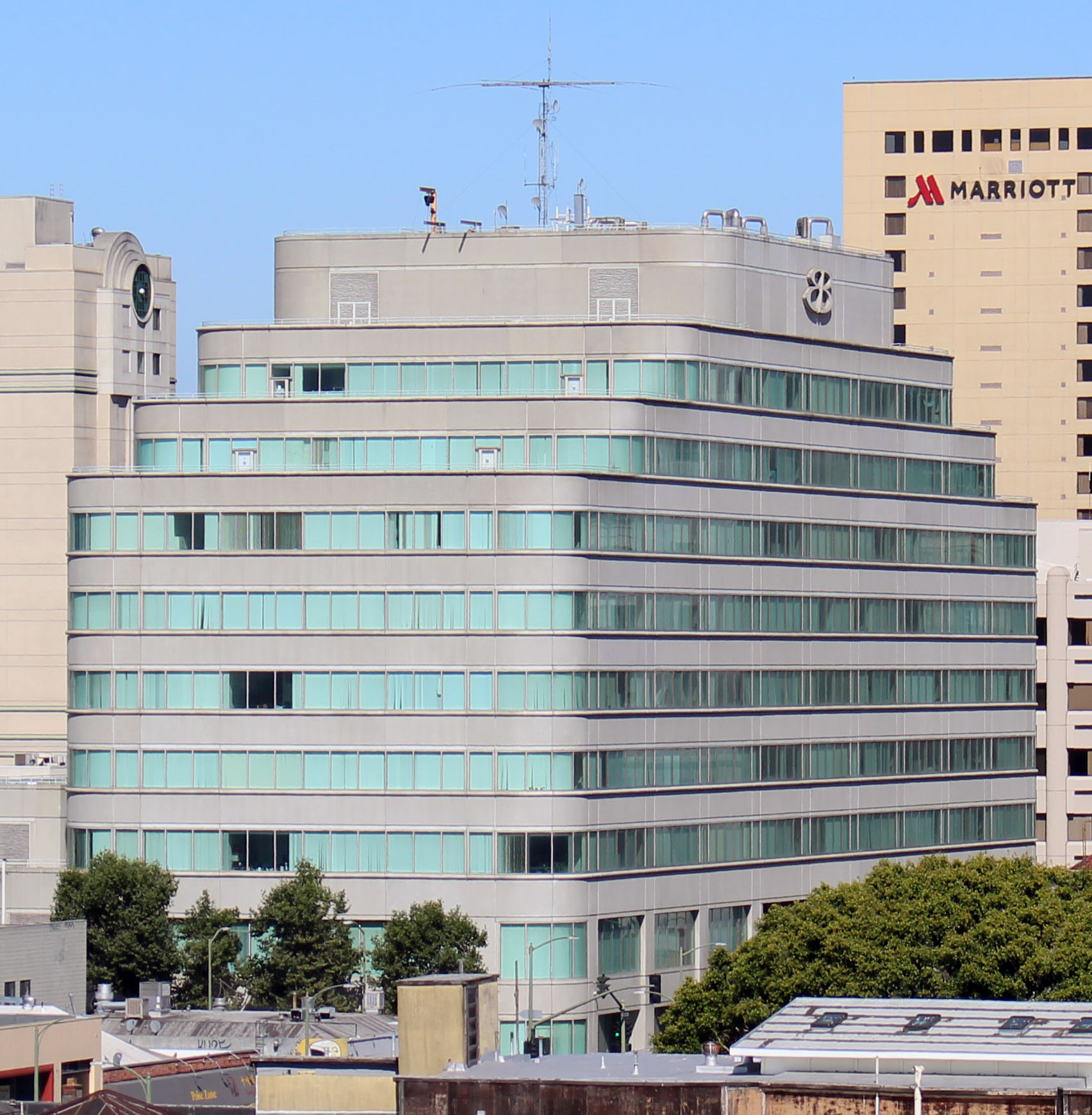
- Administrative offices in Oakland

Agency overview
- Jurisdiction: Eastern region of the San Francisco Bay Area
- Headquarters: 375 11th Street Oakland, CA 94607-4240
- Annual budget: US$1.8 billion (July 2015 – June 2017)
- Website: https://www.ebmud.com/

East Bay Municipal Utility District (EBMUD) is a public utility district which provides water and sewage treatment services for an area of approximately 331 square miles (860 km^{2}) in the eastern side of San Francisco Bay. As of 2018, EBMUD provides drinking water for approximately 1.4 million people in portions of Alameda County and Contra Costa County in California, including the cities of Richmond, El Cerrito, Hercules, San Pablo, Pinole, Lafayette, Moraga, Orinda, Danville, Oakland, Piedmont, Emeryville, Berkeley, Albany, Alameda, San Leandro, neighboring unincorporated regions, and portions of cities such as Hayward and San Ramon. Sewage treatment services are provided for 685,000 people in an 88-square-mile area (as of 2018). EBMUD currently has an average annual growth rate of 0.8% and is projected to serve 1.6 million people by 2030. Headquartered in Oakland, EBMUD owns and maintains 2 water storage reservoirs on the Mokelumne River, 5 terminal reservoirs, 91 miles (146 km) of water transmission aqueducts, 4,100 miles (6,600 km) of water mains, 6 water treatment plants (WTPs), 29 miles (47 km) of wastewater interceptor sewer lines and a regional wastewater treatment facility (WWTF) rated at a maximum treatment capacity of 320 MGD.

== EBMUD Reservoirs ==
- Camanche Reservoir
- Pardee Reservoir
- Briones Reservoir
- Lafayette Reservoir
- San Pablo Reservoir
- Upper San Leandro Reservoir

== History ==
In 1923, EBMUD was founded due to the rapid population growth and severe drought in the area. The district constructed Pardee Dam (finished in 1929) on the Mokelumne River in the Sierra Nevada, and a large steel pipe Mokelumne Aqueduct to transport the water from Pardee Reservoir across the Central Valley to the San Pablo Reservoir located in the hills of the East Bay region. In subsequent years, EBMUD constructed two additional aqueducts to distribute water to several other East Bay reservoirs. From the various large regional reservoirs, water is transported to treatment plants and delivered to local reservoirs and tanks, thence distributed by gravity to customers.

In the 1980s with federal grant funding, EBMUD undertook a major facility expansion to accommodate wet weather waste water overflow (i.e. the vastly increased system demand in the rainy season). This project took many years of construction for implementation, after the planning and Environmental Impact Statement phases.

In 1994, the EBMUD board of directors approved the Seismic Improvement Plan (SIP), a $189 million capital project designed to minimize damage and disruption in the event of a potential earthquake along the Hayward Fault. One of EBMUD's main water supply lines, the Claremont Tunnel, traverses the Hayward Fault, and the maximum credible earthquake along the fault could sever the tunnel, which was originally built in 1929. Some of the major projects included in SIP were the Southern Loop Pipeline, a new 11-mile (18 km) seismically-reinforced alternate route which would allow restoration of water service; and seismic upgrades to the Claremont Tunnel. The expected benefit of SIP was avoiding a potential $1.2 billion in lost revenue and damage resulting from a major earthquake.

In May 2008, EBMUD announced severe drought and austerity measures for its customers. With the easing of the drought, these measures were rescinded in 2010. EBMUD announced mandatory water rationing again in August 2014. The emergency regulations imposed during this prolonged drought were relaxed effective July 1, 2016, after the drought was declared officially ended. EBMUD announced mandatory water rationing again in April 2022, following a bleak California snow survey and the driest January to March period on record.

== Finances ==
As with other public entities, the District has significantly underfunded liabilities for legacy costs. These include $535 million for retirement and $89 million for retiree health.

EBMUD has several sources of revenue for both water and sewage treatment enterprises. These sources include the sale of water, hydroelectric power, system capacity charges, sewage treatment charges, connection fees, wet weather facilities charges, interest and property tax increments.

In 2007, the water system was anticipated to generate a total of $375.5 million in revenue. Water sales account for approximately 76 percent of the revenue, with System Capacity Charges generating an additional 7 percent in revenue. Property Tax Revenue is expected to generate an additional 5 percent of revenues, with interest, electric energy sales, reimbursements and other sources making up the remaining 12 percent of revenues.

== Water rights ==
Historically, 90 percent of the water used by EBMUD comes from the 577 square mile protected Mokelumne River watershed. EBMUD has water rights for up to 325 million U.S. gallons per day (MGD) (997 acre-feet) or a total of 364,000 acre-feet per year. In normal years, EBMUD reservoirs in the East Bay receive an additional 30,000 acre-feet of local water from runoff annually. In dry years, evaporation and other losses can total more than the local runoff. Runoff from the Mokelumne watershed is not sufficient to meet EBMUD customer needs in times of severe drought.

In February 2020, 75 project customers, including East Bay Municipal Utility District, received permanent federal water contracts for the Central Valley Project.

== Effects of California drought ==
In April 2015, EBMUD declared a Stage 4 critical drought and has set a community-wide goal to reduce water use by 20%. To reach this goal, EBMUD has adopted new water rules that affect all customers and must supplement normal water supplies with water from additional sources, like 33,250 acre-feet from the Central Valley Project. EBMUD has enforced strict water restrictions in order to ensure all conservation measures are being taken. By the end of 2015, EBMUD was projected to have in storage 320,000 to 330,000 acre-feet of water.

On May 10, 2016, EBMUD declared an end to the drought emergency, as their reservoirs had more water than average. The board voted to relax many of the water conservation rules and the 25% surcharge, effective July 1, 2016. It announced that Pardee Reservoir had reached 100 percent of its capacity in January 2017 and had begun releasing excess water into Camanche Reservoir.

== Future expansion ==
EBMUD has begun considering the expansion of its own Pardee Reservoir as the main route to secure enough water for its projected 2040 requirements. This proposal would expand Pardee Reservoir by building a new dam on the river. Environmentalists claimed that this action would destroy a beautiful section of the river which is used by the public for fishing, swimming and kayaking. Environmental activists such as the coordinator of the Environmental Water Caucus criticized EBMUD for disregarding an opportunity to join the consortium interested considering expanding the Los Vaqueros Reservoir (built and operated by the Contra Costa Water District (CCWD)). EBMUD countered its critics by saying that at the time their officials believed the Los Vaqueros proposal was not sufficiently developed to be a reliable alternative for their future plans. CCWD officials pointed out that their expansion plans were much further developed than any of EBMUD's alternatives.

In 2009, environmental activists groups sued to block approval of an Environmental Impact Statement (EIS) for the Pardee Reservoir expansion proposal. (Note: Plaintiffs in the suit were:California Sportfishing Protection Alliance (CSPA), Friends of the River and the Foothill Conservancy.) Following a two-year trial, Sacramento Superior Court Judge Timothy Frawley agreed with the plaintiffs' objections and rejected the EIS in 2011. His ruling stated that EBMUD had not adequately addressed all the potential environmental harms of the project. Specifically, Judge Frawley said the document completely omitted discussing a less destructive alternative - working with CCWD on expanding Los Vaqueros reservoir. Moreover, it neglected to discuss the impacts of: (1) flooding two whitewater runs (Electra and Middle Bar); (2) destroying the historic Middle Bar Bridge and (3) inundating a stand of black willow trees that were important to the culture of the native Miwok people. After reviewing the ruling, EBMUD announced in December, 2011, that it had dropped plans for a new dam on the Mokelumne River, and would work with CCWD on expanding Los Vaqueros.

== See also ==
- Camanche Dam
- Pardee Dam
- Los Vaqueros Reservoir
