= Mokelumne River =

River in northern California

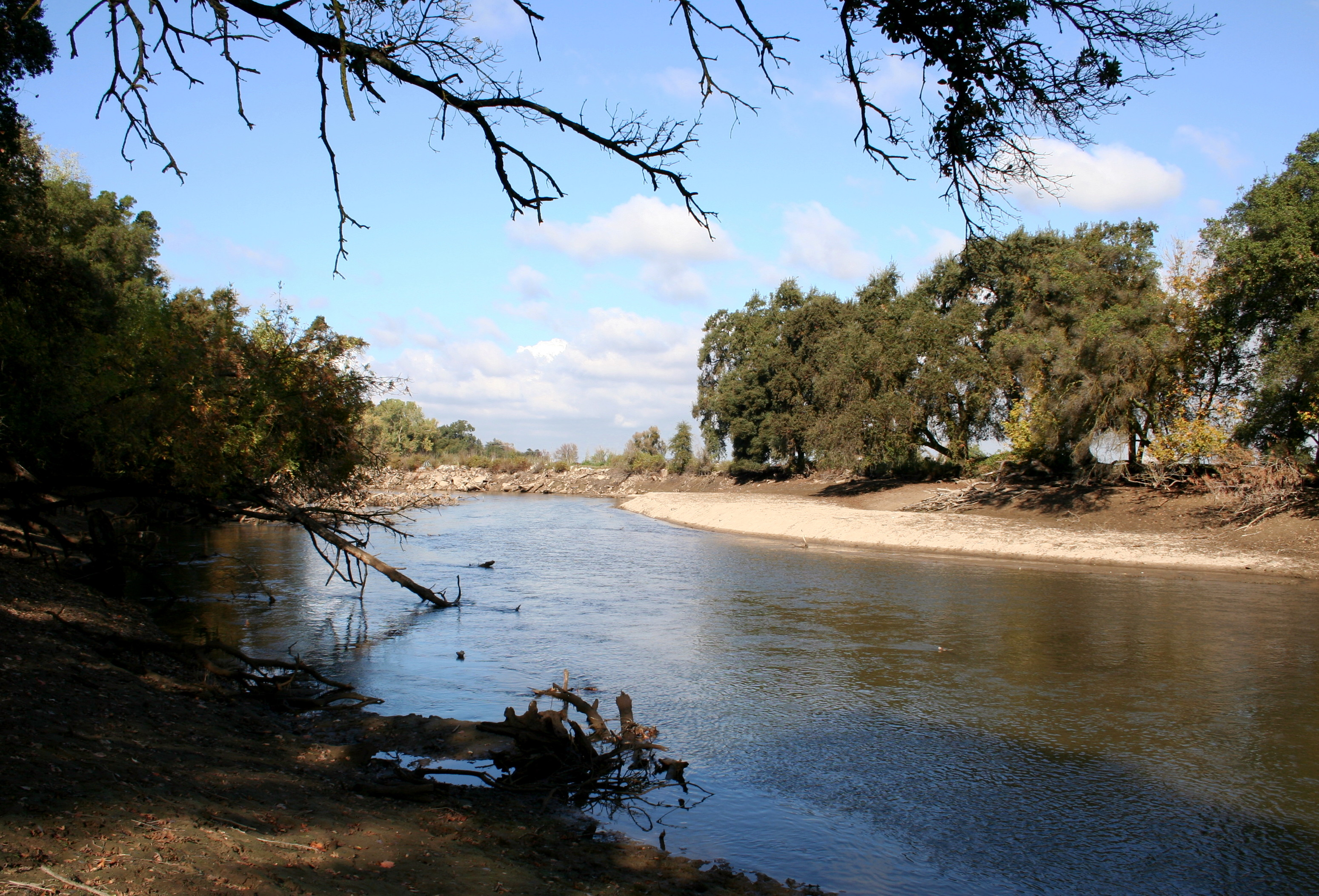
- The Mokelumne River near Lodi, California.

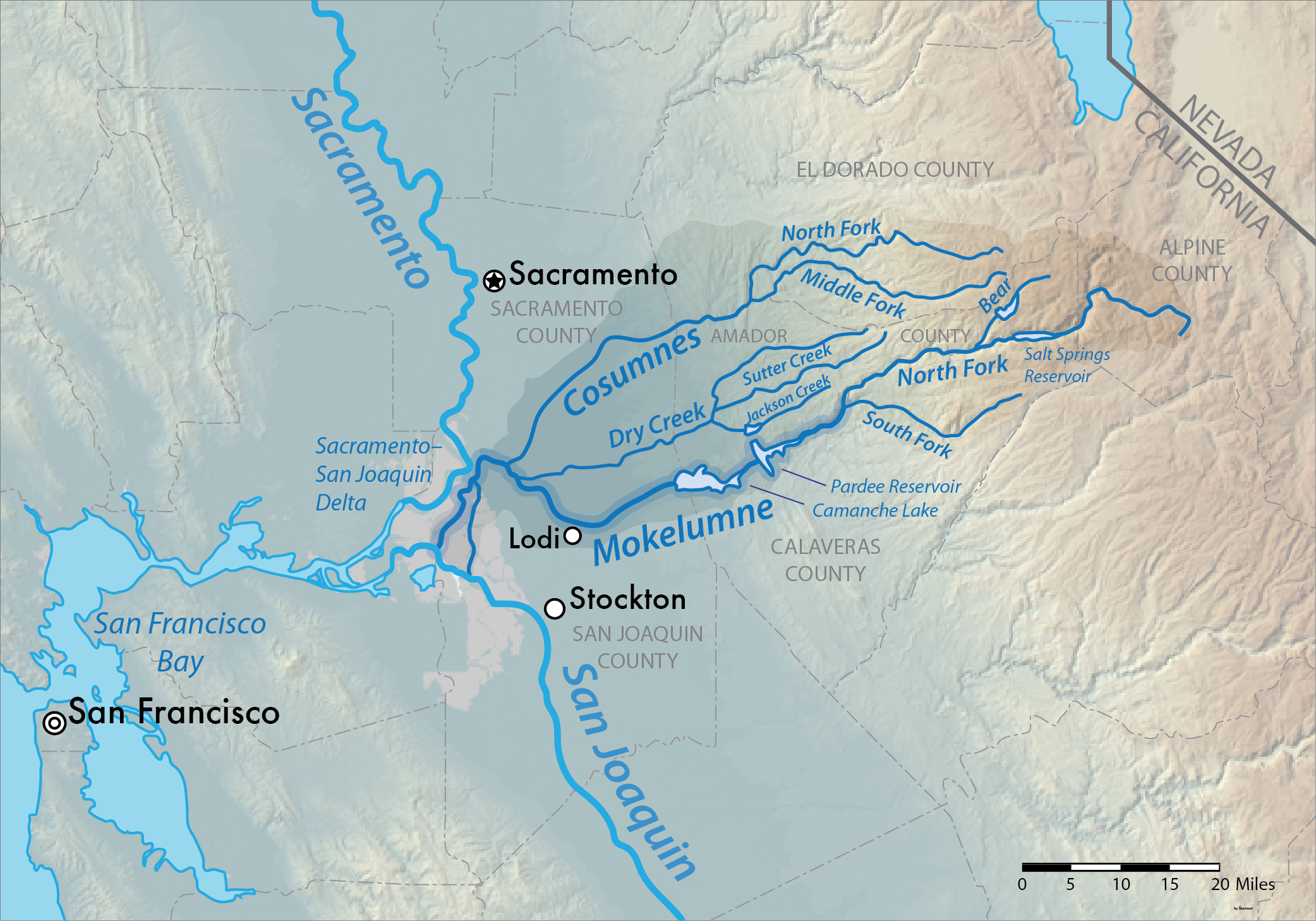
- Map of the Mokelumne River watershed

Location
- Country: United States
- State: California

Physical characteristics
- Source: Confluence of North and Middle Forks
  - location: Sierra Nevada, Amador/Calaveras Counties
  - coordinates: 38°22′20″N 120°36′38″W
  - elevation: 916 ft (279 m)
- Mouth: Sacramento-San Joaquin Delta
  - location: Walnut Grove, San Joaquin County
  - coordinates: 38°05′46″N 121°34′12″W
  - elevation: 0 ft (0 m)
- Length: 95 mi (153 km)
- Basin size: 2,143 sq mi (5,550 km^{2})
- Discharge
  - location: near Mokelumne Hill, above Pardee Reservoir
  - average: 996 cu ft/s (28.2 m^{3}/s)
  - minimum: 9 cu ft/s (0.25 m^{3}/s)
  - maximum: 41,300 cu ft/s (1,170 m^{3}/s)

The Mokelumne River (/məˈkʌləmni/ or /məˈkʌləmi/; Mokelumne, Miwok for "People of the Fish Net") is a 95-mile-long (153 km) river in northern California in the United States. The river flows west from a rugged portion of the central Sierra Nevada into the Central Valley and ultimately the Sacramento–San Joaquin River Delta, where it empties into the San Joaquin River-Stockton Deepwater Shipping Channel. Together with its main tributary, the Cosumnes River, the Mokelumne drains 2,143 square miles (5,550 km^{2}) in parts of five California counties. Measured to its farthest source at the head of the North Fork, the river stretches for 157 miles (253 km).

The river is colloquially divided into the Upper Mokelumne River, which stretches from the headwaters to Pardee Reservoir in the Sierra foothills, and the Lower Mokelumne River, which refers to the portion of the river below Camanche Dam. In its lower course, the Mokelumne is used heavily for irrigation and also provides water for the east San Francisco Bay Area through the Mokelumne Aqueduct. Several major tributaries of the river have been developed for the generation of hydroelectric power.

The name is Plains Miwok and is constructed from moke, meaning fishnet, and -umne, a suffix meaning "people of". The town of Mokelumne Hill was named for the river in about 1850.

== Course ==
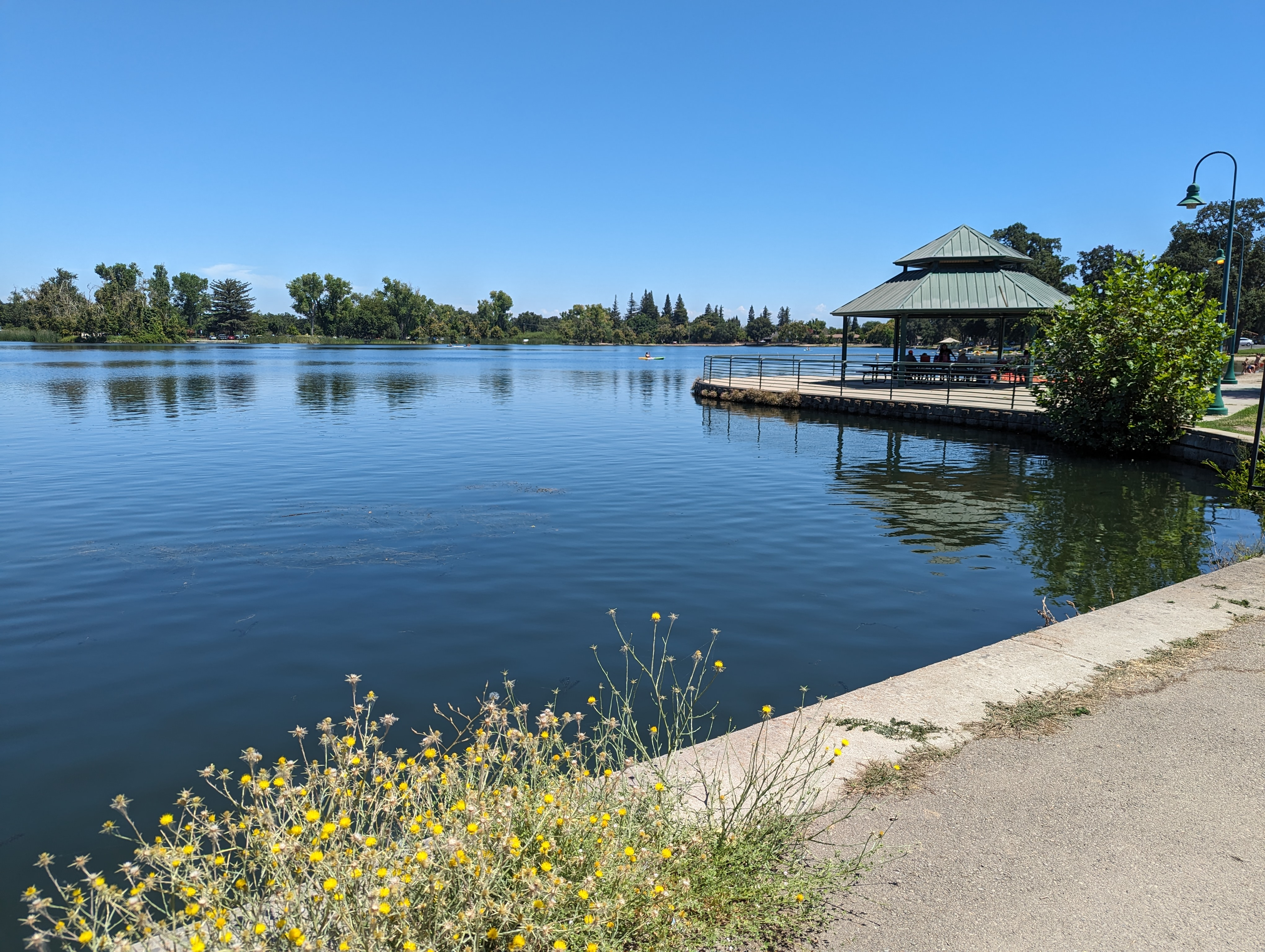
Lodi Lake on the Mokelumne River in Lodi, California

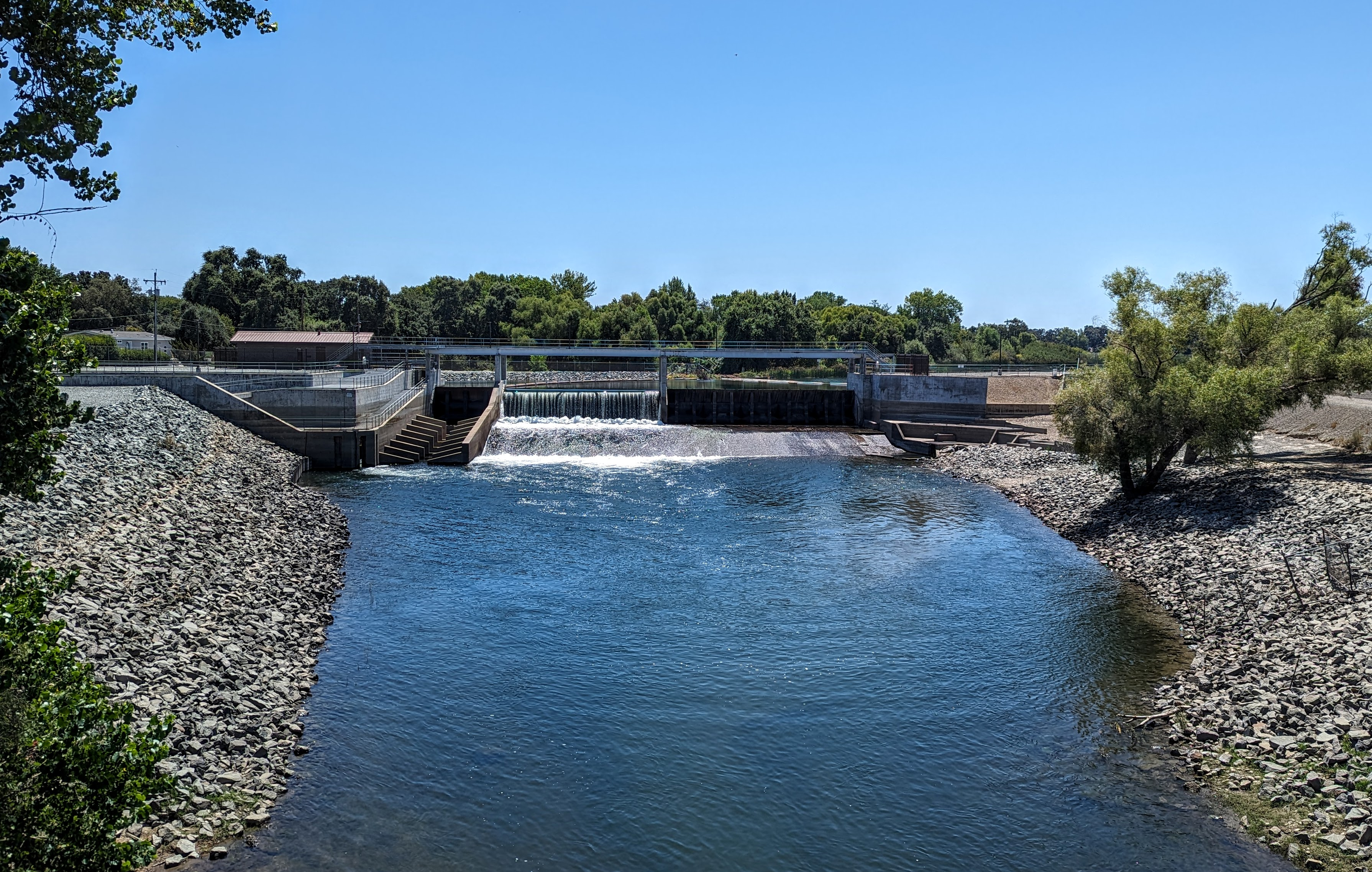
Woodbridge Dam, which maintains Lodi Lake on the Mokelumne River

The Mokelumne is formed by the confluence of several forks that rise in the central Sierra Nevada in the Stanislaus National Forest. The 62-mile (100 km) North Fork is the largest, originating at Lower Highland Lake at an elevation of 8,584 feet (2,616 m). From its source it flows north then west for 28 miles (45 km) to Salt Springs Reservoir. Below Salt Springs it receives the Bear River from the north and then passes through the smaller Tiger Creek Reservoir before joining with the Middle Fork southeast of Pine Grove. The lower portion of the North Fork defines the border between Amador and Calaveras Counties.

The 28-mile (45 km) Middle Fork rises at 6,800 feet (2,100 m) on the west side of Bailey Ridge, near Ganns. It flows generally west, past Wilseyville and West Point, to its confluence with the North Fork. The South Fork begins at an elevation of 6,380 feet (1,940 m) very near the head of the Middle Fork, and flows west 26 miles (42 km), roughly parallel and south of the Middle Fork, to join the Middle Fork about 1.3 miles (2.1 km) above the confluence of the North and Middle Forks.

The confluence of the North and Middle Forks forms the Mokelumne River proper. The main stem flows west-southwest past Mokelumne Hill into Pardee Reservoir, formed by the 345-foot-high (105 m) Pardee Dam. Below Pardee the river flows directly into Camanche Reservoir, formed by Camanche Dam. The entire stretch of the Mokelumne between the forks and a point just above Camanche Dam defines the Amador—Calaveras county line; below here, it flows westwards into San Joaquin County.

The Camanche Dam is the first non-passable barrier for anadromous fish. Below Camanche Dam the Mokelumne meanders 34 miles (55 km) to its confluence with the San Joaquin River, first continuing southwest out of the Sierra foothills past Lockeford and then turning northwest at Lodi, where the small Woodbridge Dam impounds the river, forming Lodi Lake. The river receives Dry Creek from the east near Thornton and shortly afterwards receives its major tributary, the Cosumnes River, from the northeast. At this point, the river has reached its northernmost point about 25 miles (40 km) south of Sacramento.

The river continues west then south into the Sacramento–San Joaquin River Delta where it becomes tidal and splits into a pair of distributaries, the North and South Mokelumne River (not to be confused with the North and South Forks in the Mokelumne headwaters) which together encircle the 9,100 acres (3,700 ha) of Staten Island. About 7 miles (11 km) downstream the branches rejoin, and two miles (3.2 km) below this point the Mokelumne flows into the San Joaquin River.

== Watershed ==
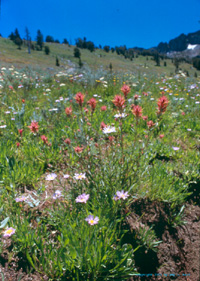
The Mokelumne Wilderness, in the headwaters of the Mokelumne River

The Mokelumne River watershed drains 2,143 square miles (5,550 km^{2}) in parts of Alpine, Amador, Calaveras, San Joaquin, and Sacramento Counties. Elevations range from sea level at the confluence with the San Joaquin River to 10,400 feet (3,200 m) at the crest of the Sierra Nevada in the headwaters of the North Fork.

The Mokelumne watershed divide borders the basins of the American River on the north, the Calaveras and Stanislaus rivers to the south, and the Carson River to the east. The American, Calaveras and Stanislaus rivers, like the Mokelumne, drain westwards into the Central Valley, while the Carson flows eastwards into the Great Basin. Drainage within the Mokelumne watershed generally occurs from east to west with all of the perennial streams originating in the Sierra Nevada.

The Mokelumne River and its headwater forks above Lodi drain the southernmost part of the basin. The part of the basin above Pardee Dam is referred to as the Upper Mokelumne River Basin and drains about 550 square miles (1,400 km^{2}), or 25.7% of the total watershed. The Cosumnes River and its own North, Middle and South forks drain about 724 square miles (1,880 km^{2}) in the northern part of the basin, or about 33.8% of the total watershed. Dry Creek, which itself is formed by four Sierra streams – Jackson, Sutter, Amador and Rancheria Creeks – drains most of the area between the upper Mokelumne and Cosumnes basins, or about 324 square miles (840 km^{2}).

The upper watershed is situated principally in Alpine, Amador and Calaveras Counties and consists mostly of wilderness managed under various federal designations. Most of the Mokelumne and Cosumnes River headwaters lie within the Stanislaus and Eldorado National Forests. Much of the upper watershed is also protected under the 105,165-acre (42,559 ha) Mokelumne Wilderness. The Salt Springs State Game Refuge is located along the Mokelumne River near Salt Springs Reservoir. There are also significant private holdings in the upper basin including commercial timber land and protected watershed areas administered by the East Bay Municipal Utility District, which diverts urban and industrial water from Pardee Reservoir.

The lower watershed, mainly within San Joaquin and Sacramento Counties, is part of the rich agricultural region of the Central Valley. Grapes are the major crop grown in the Mokelumne River watershed; as of 2001, vineyards comprised 51% of the basin's farmland. Of the remaining land, 31% is used for livestock, 9% for orchards, and 8% for annual crops. About 90,000 acres (36,000 ha) in the lower basin are part of the Mokelumne River AVA.

In May 2021, it was reported that a trove of 5- to 10-million-year-old fossils was unearthed in June 2020 in the Mokelumne River watershed near Valley Springs, California, including a two-tusked mastodon, a four-tusked gomphothere, rhinoceros, camel, horse, tortoise, tapir, bird, fish, and other specimens.

== History ==
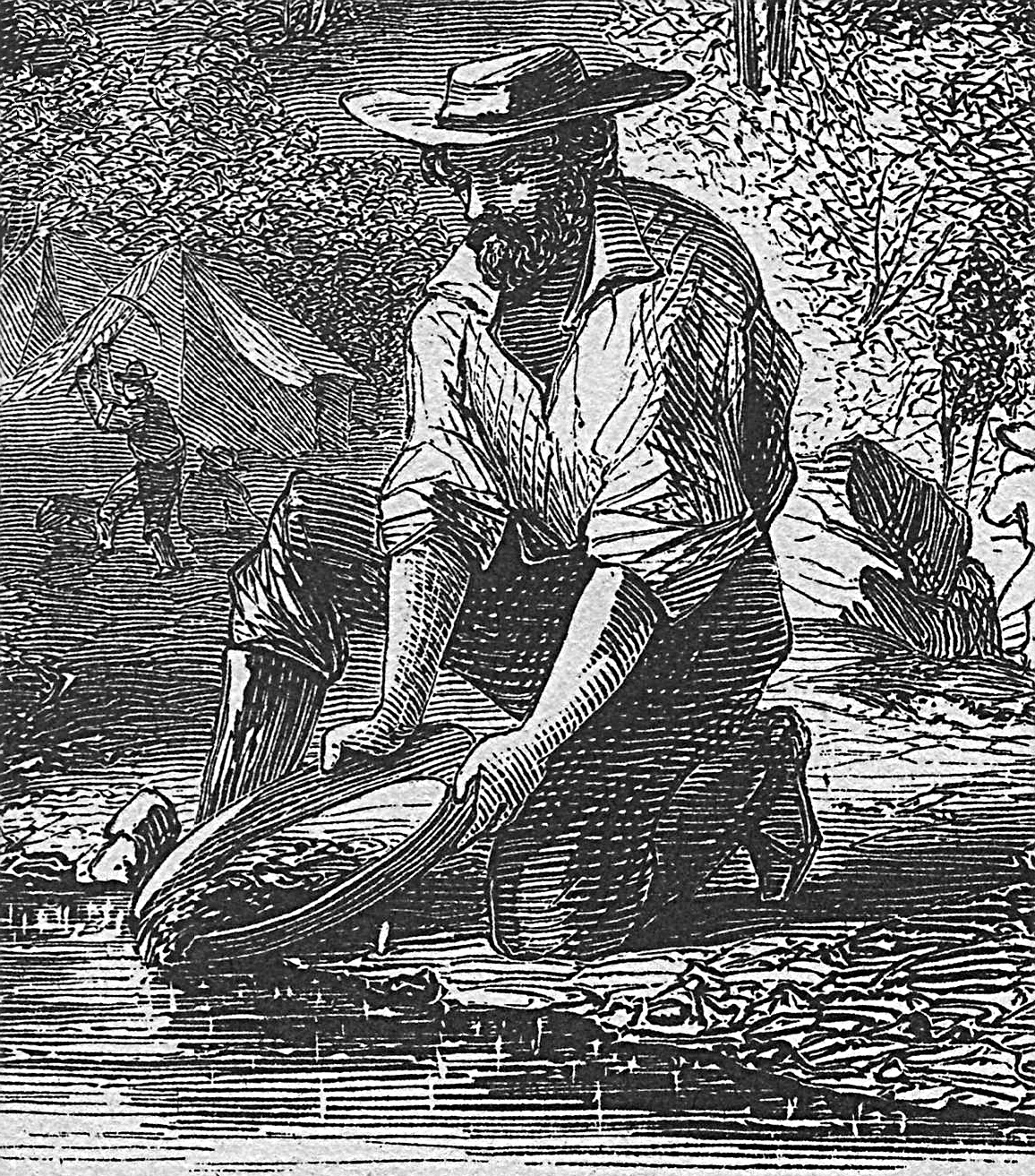
Panning for gold on the Mokelumne River, near Big Bar

The Mokelumne River basin was originally inhabited by Yokuts, Miwok, and Wintun Native American people. The lower (western) basin was the most densely populated, with numerous villages between the fringe of the Sierra foothills and the eastern edge of the Sacramento–San Joaquin Delta. This area is believed to have been predominantly Plains Miwok; various subgroups that lived in the Mokelumne River basin included the Mokellos, Lalas, and Machacos. The Miwoks called the river Wakalumitch, possibly meaning "big river".

The first European parties to explore the river were likely Spanish military expeditions in Alta California in the late 18th or early 19th century. The name Mokelumne was first recorded by Spanish missionary Narciso Durán as Muquelumnes in 1817. However it was not until 1830 when the first permanent European settlement was established on the Mokelumne River, at Happy Valley near present-day Mokelumne Hill, as an outpost for French fur trappers. John C. Frémont is credited with establishing the modern spelling of the name Mokelumne circa 1844.

During the California Gold Rush, the Mokelumne was a major gold-producing stream. The first person to discover gold in the Mokelumne was likely Charles Weber in 1848. Weber did not stay in the area for long; he moved on to the Coloma diggings on the South Fork American River before establishing a supply center at present-day Stockton, several miles south of the Mokelumne River. Most of the Gold Rush profits and trade on the Mokelumne River would end up passing through Stockton. Also in 1848, Samuel W. Pearsall found gold at Mokelumne Hill, which by 1850 grew into a boomtown of 15,000 people.

== Recreational uses ==
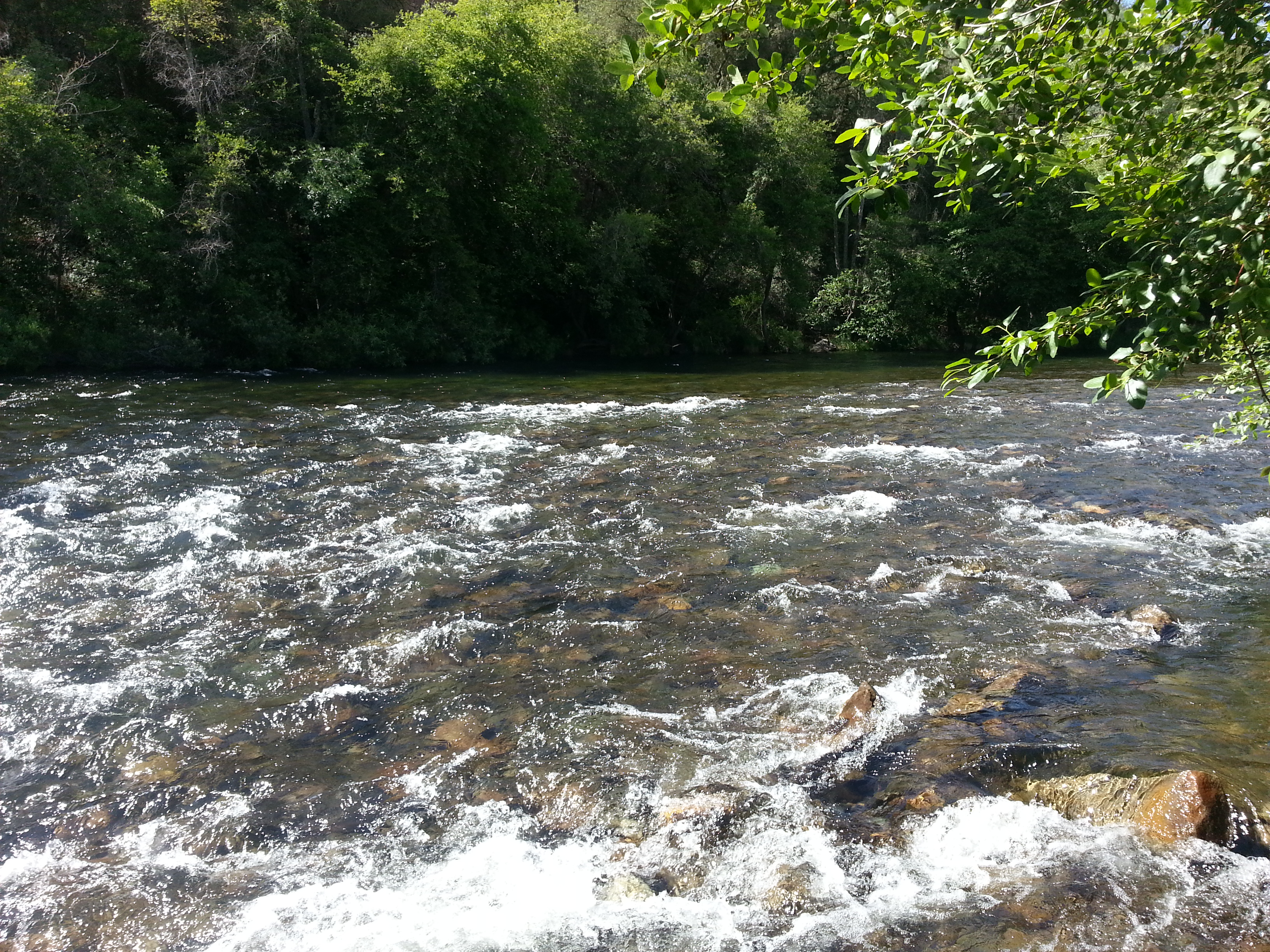
Rapids west of Highway 49, part of the Electra-Middle Bar Class II-III whitewater kayaking run

The Mokelumne River is home to five notable whitewater kayaking runs: Fantasy Falls, Devil's Nose, Tiger Creek Dam, Ponderosa and Electra-Middle Bar. Fantasy Falls, a Class V+, 26-mile wilderness reach, runs from below Highway 4 in Alpine County to the backwaters of Salt Springs Reservoir. Devil's Nose, Class IV-V, runs 17 miles from Salt Springs Dams to Tiger Creek Powerhouse. Below Tiger Creek Dam is the Tiger Creek Dam Whitewater run, a scenic, 3 mile Class IV run. The Ponderosa run goes from Ponderosa Way to Electra Powerhouse. The westernmost run is Electra-Middle Bar, a 5+-mile Class II-III run. It begins just below the Electra Powerhouse, passes under Highway 49 south of Jackson, CA and ends at the Middle Bar Bridge.

The Mokelumne is also a popular site for fishing, camping, water play, birding, picnics, gold panning, spring wildflower watching, and other activities. Electra Road, just east of Highway 49, is a popular place to run, walk, and enjoy the river. The large granite domes, Calaveras Dome and Hammer Dome, near Salt Springs Reservoir, are popular for technical rock climbing. Three campgrounds are also located near Salt Springs: Mokelumne River, White Azalea, and Moore Creek.

Downstream, the river is also a popular recreational destination, particularly the day-use area at the base of the Camanche Dam, which includes the Mokelumne River Fish Hatchery, and Lodi Lake, a city park in the small town of Lodi.

The California Office of Environmental Health Hazard Assessment (OEHHA) has developed a safe eating advisory for Lower Mokelumne River based on levels of mercury or PCBs found in fish caught from this water body.

== River modifications ==
The first diversions of the Mokelumne were made during the California Gold Rush in the mid-1850s to provide water for placer and hydraulic mining. The first irrigation scheme was organized by a local collective, the Mokelumne Ditch and Irrigation Company, in 1875, but their dam was demolished by a flood and never rebuilt. The Woodbridge Canal and Irrigation Company was founded in 1891, and was somewhat more successful at tapping Mokelumne River water, but they were still hampered by damaging spring floods and lack of water in the dry season.

In 1929 the East Bay Municipal Utilities District (EBMUD) built the large Pardee Dam several miles upstream from Lodi and the irrigation diversion points on the Mokelumne River. Pardee is the primary storage facility and diversion point for the 91-mile (146 km) Mokelumne Aqueduct, which provides water to 35 municipalities in the eastern San Francisco Bay Area in Alameda and Contra Costa Counties. The first water deliveries to the Bay Area were made on June 23, 1929. The dam can store about 215,000 acre-feet (0.265 km^{3}) which is slightly over one quarter of the Mokelumne's annual flow. Through an agreement between EBMUD and local farmers, Pardee also stabilized the dry season water level in the lower Mokelumne, allowing much greater use of the river for agriculture.

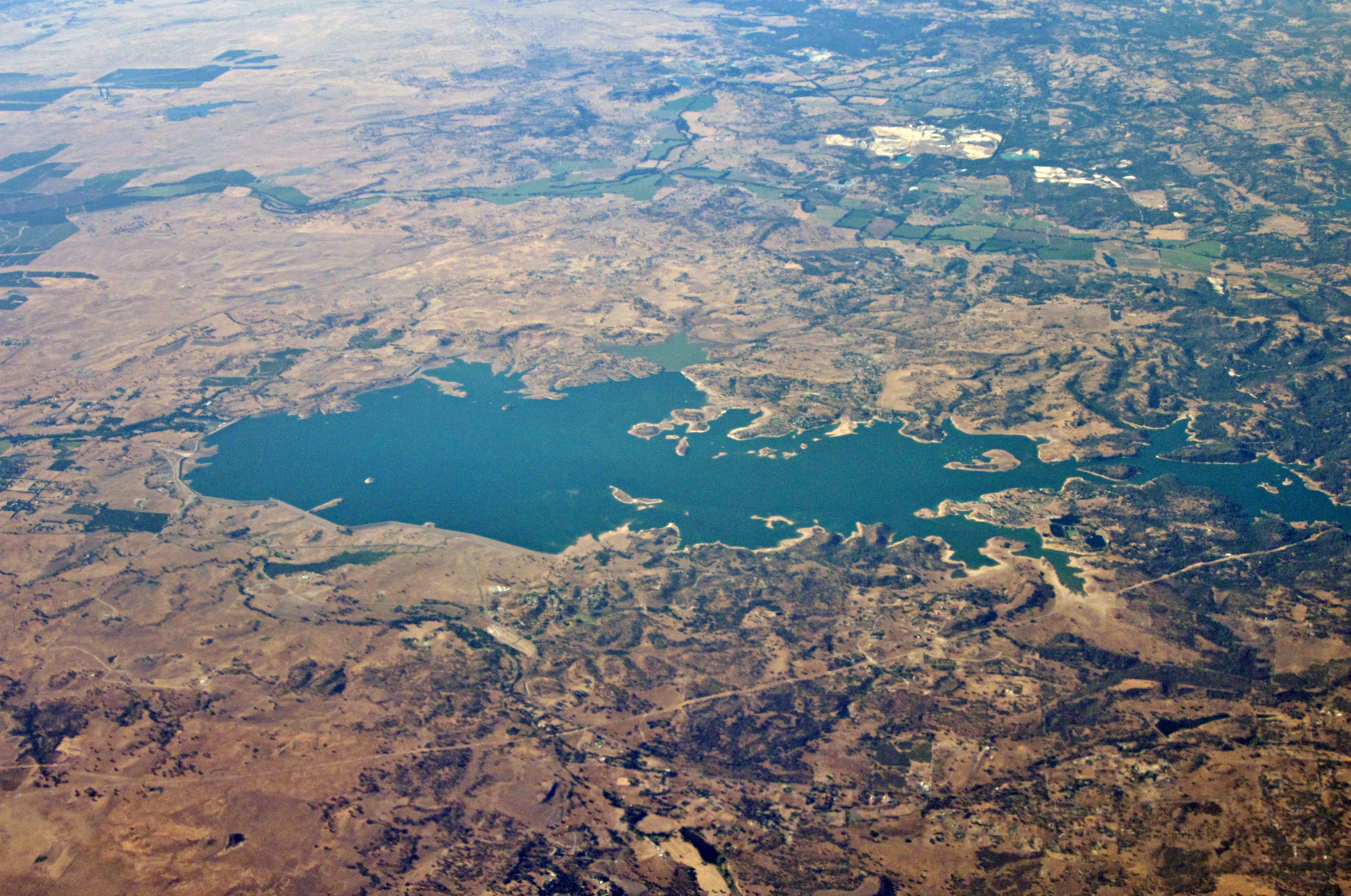
The Mokelumne River's Camanche Reservoir seen from the air, with the dam to the west (left)

As early as 1897, the Mokelumne was utilized for the generation of hydroelectric power at the Blue Lakes powerhouse, near Jackson, to provide power for local communities. Pacific Gas and Electric (PG&E) began to develop the river for hydroelectricity in the late 1800s. In 1925, the Mokelumne hydroelectric project was licensed, and its major dam, Salt Springs, was completed on the North Fork of the Mokelumne in 1931. The project also includes two dams on the Bear River, the Tiger Creek Dam, and several smaller reservoirs in the Mokelumne headwaters. The project can provide a maximum output of 206 megawatts of electricity from four powerhouses.

In 1963 Camanche Dam was built directly below Pardee to capture additional Mokelumne River runoff. Its primary purpose is to provide flood control for downstream communities, which allows more water to be retained in Pardee Reservoir for the Bay Area's use. Camanche forms the largest reservoir on the Mokelumne with a capacity of 431,000 acre-feet (0.532 km^{3}). The dam regulates releases from Pardee for local uses, primarily irrigation, and provides flood control for the lower Mokelumne River. The dam is also operated by EBMUD.

The Mokelumne River in the Delta forms part of the water pathway for the Central Valley Project and State Water Project, which divert Sacramento River water to a number of aqueducts that supply central and southern California. The Sacramento River is connected to the Mokelumne River by the Delta Cross Channel, which enables the large pump stations near Tracy to draw water south across the Delta via the Mokelumne, San Joaquin, Old River and Middle River.

== Ecology ==
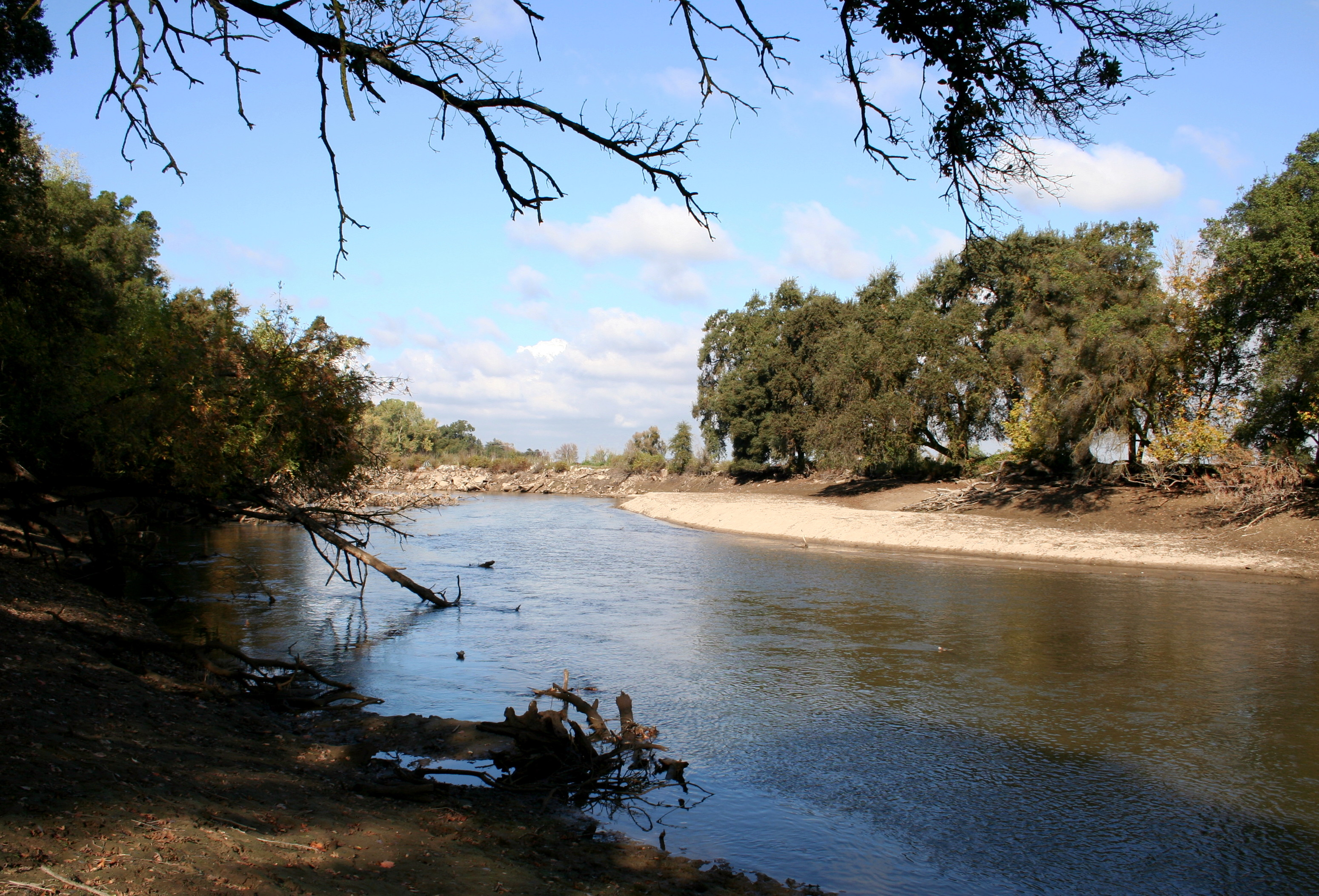
The lower Mokelumne River passing through Lodi, California

The Mokelumne River provides habitat for Pacific salmon and steelhead trout spawning runs. These fish were historically able to migrate upstream of the present site of Pardee Dam, before a natural waterfall prevented further progress. Between 1950 and 1997 the annual fall chinook salmon run has had an estimated average of 3434 fish. The construction of Camanche Dam has blocked access to several miles of the highest quality habitat formerly available to salmonids in the Mokelumne River. To compensate for the lost habitat, the Mokelumne River Fish Hatchery was built in 1964, a year after the completion of Camanche Dam.

The Lower Mokelumne River is home to at least 35 species of fish. In addition to salmon and trout, common native fish include prickly sculpin (Cottus asper), and Sacramento sucker (Catostomus occidentalis). The non-native western mosquitofish (Gambusia affinis), largemouth bass (Micropterus salmoides) and bluegill (Lepomis macrochirus) are also plentiful.

The Cosumnes River, the Mokelumne's major tributary, is one of only a few Sierra rivers without large dams; however, irrigation diversions have also caused problems with fish migration on this river.

For water conservation reasons, local agriculture has switched from flood irrigation to drip and sprinkler systems, and thereby become more reliant on groundwater. This is an issue since the State of California currently does not consider groundwater recharge a beneficial use. North San Joaquin Water Conservation District has the authority to work on this but many other nearby water districts do not.

== Recent conflicts ==
In its original 2040 long-range water plan, issued in 2009, the East Bay Municipal Utility District approved an optional expansion of Pardee Reservoir . The expansion would have flooded more than a mile of the river as well as unique cultural and historic sites. A broad coalition of local governments, conservation, recreation and fishery advocates opposed the reservoir expansion. Foothill Conservancy, Friends of the River and California Sportfishing Protection Alliance sued EBMUD in November 2009. In April 2011, Sacramento Superior Court Judge Timothy M. Frawley ruled in the groups' favor and voided the EBMUD plan. On December 5, 2011, East Bay Municipal Utility District announced that the soon-to-be released revised draft environmental impact report for its revised water plan would not recommend the controversial reservoir expansion. On April 24, 2012, the utility's board voted 7–0 to remove the Pardee expansion from its 2040 water plan.

== Conservation and restoration ==
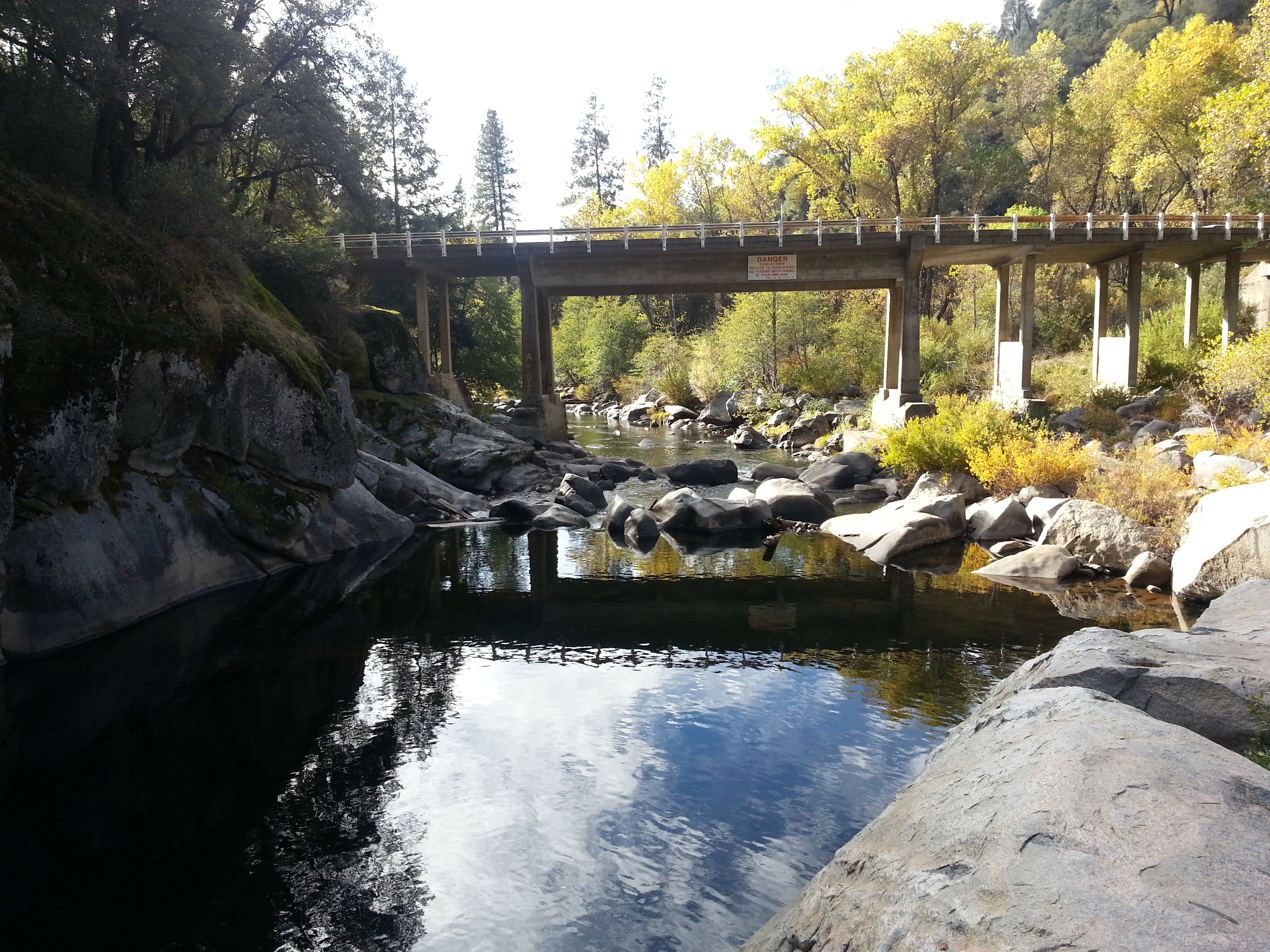
North Fork of the Mokelumne River looking downstream towards the CA-26 bridge near West Point, included in SB 1199

In 1999, federal and state agencies joined nonprofit organizations and PG&E in signing a settlement agreement for the new Federal Energy Regulatory Commission license of PG&E's hydroelectric project on the Mokelumne, known as Project 137. The agreement requires flows from the hydroelectric project to follow the natural hydrograph of the river, required the removal or dismantling of three small dams on tributary streams, improved recreational flows and facilities on the river, and incorporated an adaptive management plan with a monitoring program. The removal of West Panther Creek Dam in 2003 was the first removal of a PG&E dam in modern history. Since the signing of the settlement and issuance of the FERC license, the signatories have collaboratively managed the project's adaptive management and monitoring program.

About 37 miles of the Mokelumne from Salt Springs Powerhouse to just below Highway 49 have been found eligible for National Wild and Scenic River designation by the U.S. Forest Service and Bureau of Land Management as part of those agencies' land management planning responsibilities. In 2014, Sen. Loni Hancock (D-Oakland) introduced Senate Bill 1199 in the California State Senate to designate the river as Wild and Scenic from Salt Springs to Pardee Reservoir. The legislation was co-sponsored by Foothill Conservancy and Friends of the River, and supported by Calaveras County and a number of conservation, fish, community and tribal groups. It was opposed by Amador County and local water agencies. The East Bay Municipal Utility District initially opposed the bill but supported it with proposed author's amendments late in the legislative process. SB 1199 was passed by the Senate but stalled in the State Assembly, where it was held "in suspense" by the Appropriations Committee after approval by the Natural Resources Committee.

In 2015, California Assemblyman Frank Bigelow (R-O'Neals) and Senator Tom Berryhill (R-Twain Harte) co-sponsored state legislation, Assembly Bill 142, which called for completion of a state study before the Mokelumne could be designated a California Wild and Scenic River. After a number of amendments were made to the bill, it was adopted by the Legislature and signed into law by Governor Jerry Brown. The bill mandated a state wild and scenic river suitability study of the Mokelumne and provided interim protections for the river from Salt Springs Dam to Pardee Reservoir. The compromise bill was supported by Sierra foothill water agencies, the East Bay Municipal Utility District and river and fish conservation groups.

In January 2018, the California Natural Resources Agency released its draft Mokelumne River Wild and Scenic River Study. The study was finalized after extensive, overwhelmingly positive, public comments and with support for final recommendation language from Mokelumne-dependent water agencies, Amador and Calaveras counties, and conservation groups. The final report, issued in April 2018, recommended adding approximately 37 miles of the North Fork and main Mokelumne to the California Wild and Scenic Rivers System. The report's recommendation was incorporated into the natural resources budget trailer bill, Senate Bill 854, which was passed by the state legislature. The bill was signed into law by Governor Jerry Brown on June 27, 2018. The enactment of the legislation makes the Mokelumne the 15th river included in the California Wild and Scenic Rivers System.

In 2014, Foothill Conservancy, other conservation and fish organizations, and federal and state agencies formed a working group to explore restoring salmon and steelhead above Camanche and Pardee reservoirs. The group's work is in progress.

== Tributaries ==
- Dry Creek
- Cosumnes River
- Bear River
- Blue Creek
- Beaver Creek
- Green Creek
- Camp Creek
- Ashland Creek

== See also ==
- Mokelumne River AVA
- Mokelumne River Fish Hatchery
- Foothill Conservancy
- East Bay Municipal Utility District (EBMUD)
- Pardee Dam, Pardee Reservoir
- Camanche Dam, Camanche Reservoir
