= Salt Springs Reservoir =

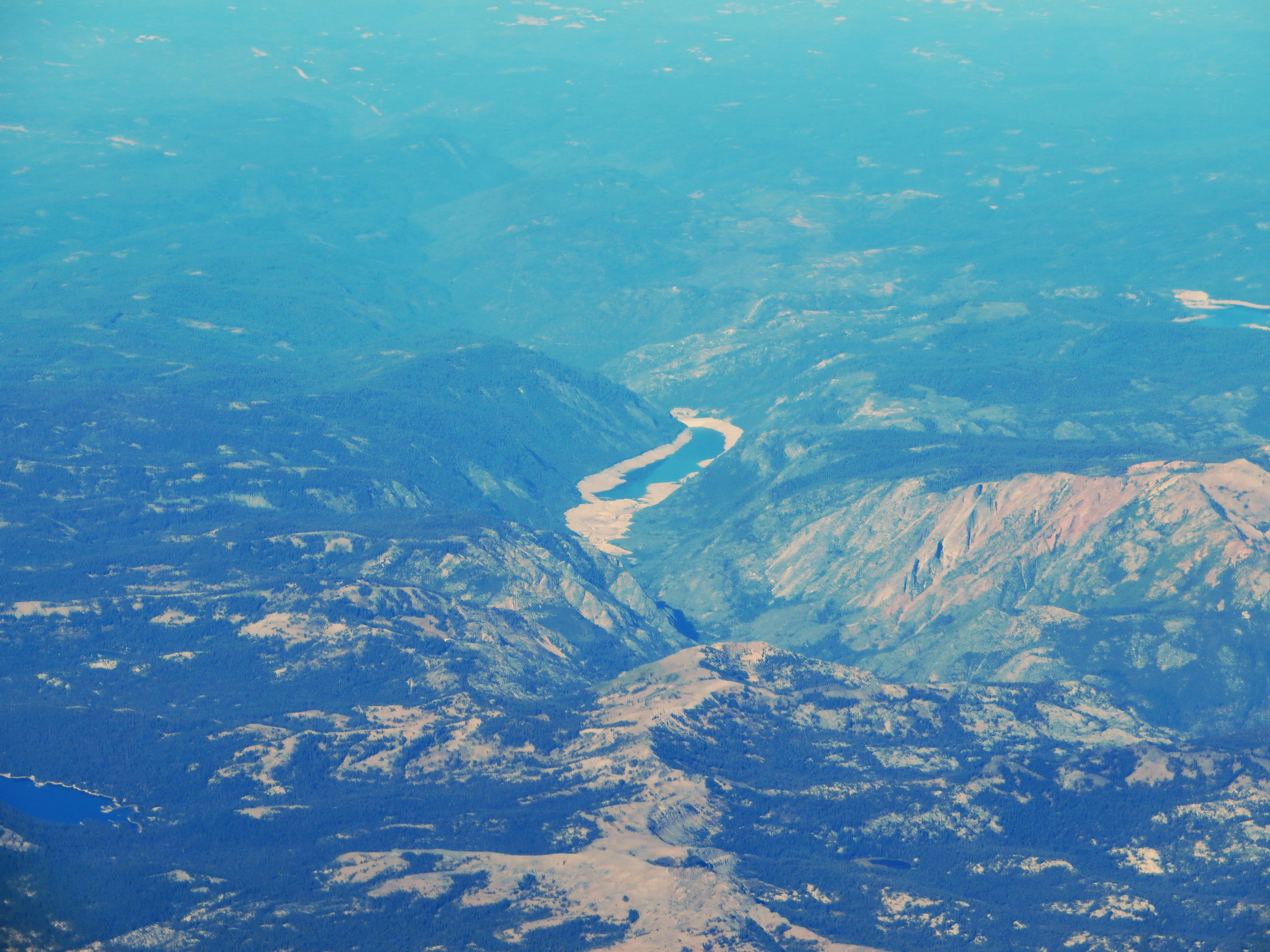
- Aerial view

- Location within California Location within the United States
- Location: Amador / Calaveras counties, California, United States
- Coordinates: 38°29′55″N 120°12′54″W
- Type: reservoir
- Basin countries: United States
- Surface elevation: 3,900 ft (1,200 m)
- Settlements: Tamarack

Salt Springs Reservoir is a reservoir in the eastern portions of Amador County and Calaveras County of California in the Sierra Nevada about 30 miles (48 km) east-northeast of Jackson. The reservoir is in the Eldorado National Forest at an elevation of 3,900 feet (1,200 m).

The 141,900 acre-foot (175,000,000 m^{3}) reservoir is formed by Salt Springs Dam on the North Fork of the Mokelumne River. The concrete-faced rock-fill dam is 332 feet (101 m) tall and was completed in 1931 (95 years ago). It is owned by Pacific Gas and Electric and its sole purpose is hydroelectricity production, though limited recreation is available. A short pipeline from the reservoir conveys water to the 44 MW Salt Springs Powerhouse. Some of the water is returned to the river downstream, but much of it flows into the Tiger Creek Conduit, a concrete flume that moves water downstream for use in other powerhouses in PG&E's Mokelumne River Project (FERC Project 137).

The dam has a history of settlement problems caused by poor consolidation of the rocks during construction. The concrete face has been cracked many times by the movement, causing leaks. The surface of the dam consists of cracks, craters and shotcrete overlays. It was decided to use a flexible geomembrane to cover the portions of the dam with the greatest leakage. The installation of the membrane was completed in 2005.

The dam is being examined as the lower pool in a 380–1,140 MW pumped-storage project with the Bear River Dam as the upper pool.

== Climate ==
Climate data for Salt Springs Reservoir
Month	Jan	Feb	Mar	Apr	May	Jun	Jul	Aug	Sep	Oct	Nov	Dec	Year
Record high °F (°C)	74 (23)	78 (26)	82 (28)	90 (32)	95 (35)	100 (38)	103 (39)	105 (41)	103 (39)	97 (36)	84 (29)	80 (27)	105 (41)
Mean daily maximum °F (°C)	53.9 (12.2)	56.3 (13.5)	61.1 (16.2)	65.7 (18.7)	74.2 (23.4)	82.9 (28.3)	89.8 (32.1)	89.9 (32.2)	84.8 (29.3)	74.5 (23.6)	59.9 (15.5)	52.9 (11.6)	70.5 (21.4)
Mean daily minimum °F (°C)	34.7 (1.5)	35.2 (1.8)	36.7 (2.6)	39.7 (4.3)	46.6 (8.1)	53.7 (12.1)	60.3 (15.7)	60.3 (15.7)	55.5 (13.1)	47.8 (8.8)	40.2 (4.6)	33.9 (1.1)	45.4 (7.4)
Record low °F (°C)	10 (−12)	11 (−12)	14 (−10)	18 (−8)	27 (−3)	33 (1)	41 (5)	40 (4)	33 (1)	22 (−6)	12 (−11)	−1 (−18)	−1 (−18)
Average precipitation inches (mm)	8.12 (206)	7.71 (196)	7.16 (182)	4.05 (103)	2.61 (66)	0.80 (20)	0.14 (3.6)	0.06 (1.5)	1.01 (26)	3.14 (80)	6.29 (160)	7.80 (198)	48.89 (1,242.1)
Average snowfall inches (cm)	11.9 (30)	12.7 (32)	13.4 (34)	3.5 (8.9)	0.1 (0.25)	0.0 (0.0)	0.0 (0.0)	0.0 (0.0)	0.0 (0.0)	0.2 (0.51)	2.2 (5.6)	5.6 (14)	49.6 (125.26)
Average precipitation days (≥ 0.01 in)	9.5	9.7	12.6	7.9	5.8	4.0	1.3	1.2	3.7	5.5	10.1	9.2	80.5
Average snowy days (≥ 0.1 in)	2.5	2.3	2.9	0.8	0.1	0	0	0	0	0.1	1.0	2.2	11.9
Source: NOAA

== See also ==
- List of dams and reservoirs in California
- List of lakes in California
