= Pardee Dam =

- Aerial view of the Pardee Dam (2026)
- Interactive map of Pardee Dam
- Location: Sierra Nevada Foothills; Amador County, California; Calaveras County, California
- Coordinates: 38°15′27″N 120°51′01″W
- Opening date: 1929; 97 years ago
- Operator: East Bay Municipal Utility District

Dam and spillways
- Impounds: Mokelumne River
- Height: 345 ft (105 m)
- Length: 1,337 ft (408 m)

Reservoir
- Creates: Pardee Reservoir
- Total capacity: 210,000 acre⋅ft (260,000,000 m^{3})
- Catchment area: 575 sq mi (1,490 km^{2})
- Surface area: 2,134 acres (864 ha)

Power Station
- Installed capacity: 23.6 MW
- Annual generation: 99,038,000 KWh (2001–2012)

Pardee Dam bridge
- Carries: Pardee Dam Road

Characteristics
- Width: 16 ft (4.9 m)

Pardee Dam is a 345-foot-high (105 m) structure across the Mokelumne River which marks the boundary between Amador and Calaveras Counties, located in the foothills of the Sierra Nevada approximately 30 miles (48 km) northeast of Stockton.

== History ==
Construction of the Pardee Dam began in July 1927. It was completed in 1929 with the first release of water into the Mokelumne Aqueduct occurring on June 23, 1929. Camp Pardee was established nearby as a community to house employees who maintained the dam.

== Overview ==
The impounded water forms Pardee Reservoir, the primary source of water for the East Bay Municipal Utility District (EBMUD) in the San Francisco Bay Area. Like all the reservoirs in the Sierra watershed, most of the water originates from the annual snowpack in the High Sierra. The reservoir normally covers 3 sq mi (7.8 km^{2}) with a 215,000 acre⋅ft (265,000,000 m^{3}) capacity and 37 miles (60 km) of shoreline. California state law prohibits human-body-to-water contact within Pardee Reservoir, so water skiers, jet skis, and lake swimmers are forbidden, but boating and fishing remain popular activities. The water is transported from Pardee Reservoir across the Central Valley via the triple steel pipe Mokelumne Aqueduct to several storage reservoirs located in the hills east of San Francisco Bay which supply drinking water to the East Bay region. The water is also used to generate electric power and for recreation.

Both the dam and its reservoir are named for George Pardee, a prominent Progressive Era politician in the Bay Area who also served as Governor of California.

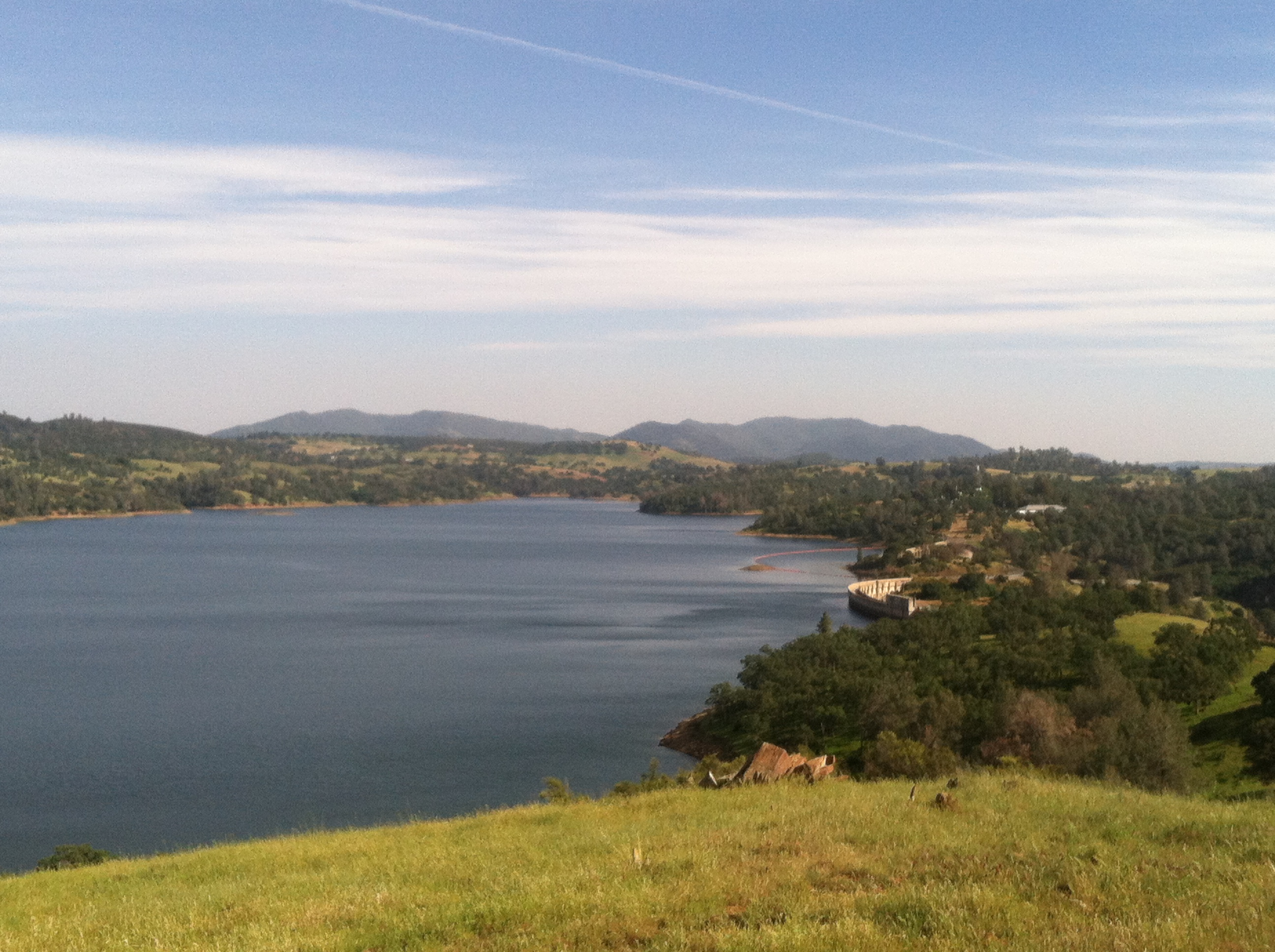
Pardee Reservoir & Pardee Dam as seen from the Pardee Road overlook.

== Salmon activity ==
Due to the many dams along the Mokelumne River, salmon runs that used to cross through to the present location of the Pardee Reservoir are stopped short in lower sections of the river. In the Fall of 2014, the fifth largest Chinook salmon count recorded in the past 74 years took place, with over 12,118 salmon. Below the dam lies a hatchery that is the result of a joint project with EBMUD and California Department of Fish and Wildlife. There, about a fourth of the returning salmon are collected and harvested for egg production. Along with raising the salmon, scientists work to manipulate river flow to encourage more salmon to return. During times of low water level, the fish are at risk of being drawn into water pumps that lead towards the south past the delta. To avoid this, scientists truck the baby salmon from the hatchery to Sherman Island in the delta. The goal of the hatchery is that the baby salmon will imprint to the water in the Mokelumne River and return when it is time for them to mate.

== See also ==
- List of dams and reservoirs in California
- List of lakes in California
- List of largest reservoirs of California
- List of the tallest dams in the United States
