= Camanche Dam =

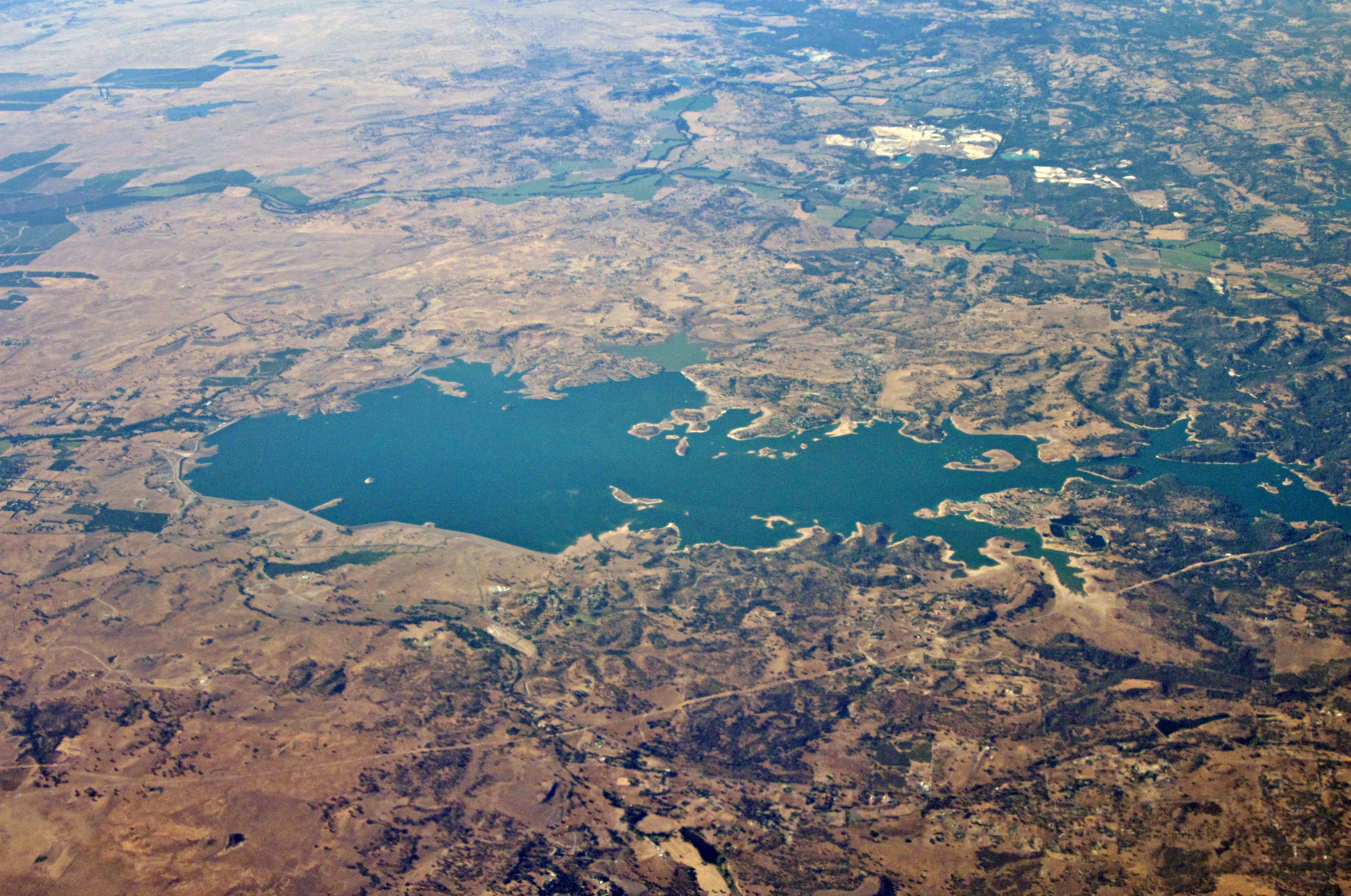
- Camanche Dam and Lake, looking north
- Interactive map of Camanche Dam
- Country: United States
- Location: San Joaquin County, California
- Coordinates: 38°13′27″N 121°01′24″W
- Status: In use
- Construction began: 1963; 63 years ago
- Opening date: 1964; 62 years ago
- Owner: East Bay Municipal Utility District

Dam and spillways
- Type of dam: Earthfill
- Impounds: Mokelumne River
- Height: 171 ft (52 m)
- Length: 2,400 ft (730 m)

Reservoir
- Creates: Camanche Reservoir
- Total capacity: 431,000 acre⋅ft (0.532 km^{3})
- Catchment area: 619 mi^{2} (1,600 km^{2})
- Surface area: 7,770 acres (3,140 ha)

Power Station
- Installed capacity: 10.7 MW
- Annual generation: 30,067,000 KWh (2001–2012)

Camanche Dam is an earthfill dam on the Mokelumne River in the central California, about 20 mi (32 km) from East Lodi. The dam and reservoir lie in the Sierra Nevada foothills in San Joaquin County. Construction of Camanche Dam was started in 1963 and completed in 1964. East Bay Municipal Utilities District (EBMUD) owns and operates it. The purpose of Camanche Dam and reservoir is to provide flood control, water flows for agriculture, habitat for fisheries and recreation for community.

== Capacity ==
The dam impounds Camanche reservoir. The capacity of Camanche Dam is approximately 431,000-acre feet (0.532 km^{3}) with 200,000-acre feet (0.25 km^{3}) of the flood control reservation. This reserve for flood storage can be shared with Pardee Dam just upstream. The approximately 173-foot-high and 2,640-foot-long dam is located on the Mokelumne River which is about 10 miles downstream from Pardee Dam. Because Camanche Dam has a 627-square-mile drainage area which accounts for about 95 percent of the watershed, the dam and reservoir provide flood damage reduction on the Mokelumne River. Camanche Dam and reservoir also maintain downstream water requirements.

== Purpose ==
Before the dam was built, flood control along the Mokelumne River was expensive. The most destructive flood in November 1950 along the Mokelumne river resulted in approximately $1.1 million in damage. Another flood in December 1955 to January 1956 created nearly $750,000 in damage. The largest flood on record occurred in December 1964 along the Mokelumne River. After completion of the Camanche Dam in April 1964, the damage was limited to several thousand dollars. Early in 1964, the Camanche Dam's operation had further reduced spring flows and slightly increased in summer and fall flows below the dam. Since the completion of Camanche Dam, the downstream flow has remained relatively constant. Based on flow at Camanche Dam, the 50 percent exceedance flow peaks at about 700 cubic feet per second (cfs) during the height of the irrigation season (June) and declines to between 200 and 300 cfs during the winter. The 10 percent exceedance flow (high flow) ranges between 1,000 cfs (September) and 2,700 cfs (May), with the flow about 2,000 cfs from January through May. The 90 percent exceedance flow (low flow) only ranges between about 100 and 300 cfs throughout the year; the highest flows occur from May through August because of water releases to the Woodbridge Irrigation District (WID).

== History ==
Before the East Bay Municipal Utility District built Camanche Dam, a small town called Camanche existed there in the early 1960s. During the Gold Rush, the area in today's West Calaveras south of the Mokelumne River claimed towns called Poverty Bar, Clay's Bar, Winters Bar and Limerick, the latter after the many Irish immigrants who settled there. In the mid-1860s, as camps and settlements dwindled, pioneers from Iowa named their most significant town Camanche, after the Iowa town of the same name–and misspelled the name of the Native American tribe (Comanche) in the same way.

Though Camanche survived through the decades, few residents were left by the time the town was emptied so that the East Bay Municipal Utility District could build a dam and reservoir in the early 1960s. The town of Camanche was thus submerged. The local news paper in 1964 carried news that " Camanche will inundate many memories", and it stated that the $35 million Dam is vital to the East Bay Municipal utility District's $283 million water project. To make way for a huge dam and its large reservoir, the town had to go along with the 40 or 50 families who called Camanche home. Construction of the dam began in August 1962. Within one year, on Dec 18, the valves were closed for the first time, and the huge reservoir begins to fill. Camanche dam, a zoned, grave-fill dam with an impervious core, rise 168 feet above streamed. It's 2,640 feet long, and 34.5 feet wide at the crest. Below it, are the East Bay fish facilities, including the largest artificial salmon spawning channel in the world, and the first of its kind in California. The huge dam will provide 140 billions gallons of storage on Mokelumne river; its flood control factor requested by the federal government are designed to protect the rich croplands in the lower river area.

Prior to the construction of Camanche Dam, acid mine drainage from a closed copper mine, the Penn Mine northwest of Valley Springs, heavily polluted the Mokelumne River. EBMUD and the state's Central Valley Regional Water Quality Control Board attempted to solve the flow of acid mine drainage into the reservoir and river, but their efforts led higher concentrations of acid mine drainage and continued fish kills in the Mokelumne. After a series of lawsuits, EBMUD, and the state funded a $10 million remediation of the site. It was completed in 1999.

== Structure ==
In the project of building Camanche Dam, a number of " safety valves" have been incorporated into the structure, including relief wells at the base of the dam and a large spillway. The wells allow underground water to escape the base of Camanche, thereby relieving undue pressure to the structure. Also, the spillway has 182,000 cubic feet per second capacity which are around six times the amount of the biggest flood in the reservoir's history.

== Recreation ==
Due to the lake's capacity over 7,700 acres of water and 56 miles of shoreline at full pool, the reservoir leased to Camanche Regional Park District by the EBMUD to develop for recreation. There are five separate campground areas which include North Shore Campground, Boat-in Campground, South-Shore Campground, Group Campgrounds and Equestrian Campground. Each campground has their own activities such as fishing, boating, camping, lodging, etc. are available for visitors. The two campgrounds at Lake Camanche are operated by the California Parks Company. One campground is located on the north side of the lake and the other on the south side. The South Shore Campground includes two RV Parks - Monument RV Park and Miners RV Park. Group and Equestrian campsites are also available. Pardee and New Hogan lakes are nearby Lake Camnche campground. Therefore, it's perfect shortcut for visitors who are seeking mountain and forest setting in Grinding Rock State Park by taking a short drive up on Highway 88.

== See also ==
- List of dams and reservoirs in California
- Pardee Dam
