= List of lakes of California =

There are more than 3,000 named lakes, reservoirs, and dry lakes in the U.S. state of California.

== Largest lakes ==
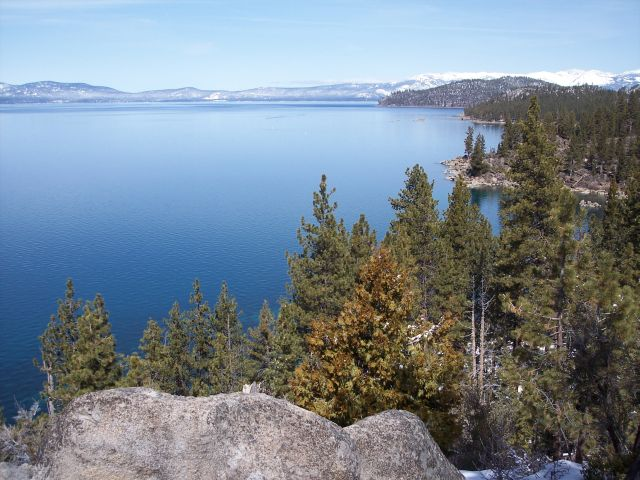
Lake Tahoe is the second deepest lake in the U.S.

In terms of area covered, the largest lake in California is the Salton Sea, a lake formed in 1905 which is now saline. It occupies 376 square miles (970 km^{2}) in the southeast corner of the state, but because it is shallow it only holds about 7.5 million acre⋅ft (2.4 trillion US gal; 9.3 trillion L) of water. Lake Tulare in the San Joaquin Valley was larger, at approximately 690 sq mi (1,800 km^{2}), until it was drained during the later years of the nineteenth century.

In terms of volume, the largest lake on the list is Lake Tahoe, located on the California–Nevada border. It holds roughly 36 cubic miles (150 km^{3}) of water. It is also the largest freshwater lake by area, at 191 mi^{2} (490 km^{2}), and the deepest lake, with a maximum depth of 1,645 feet (501 m).

Among freshwater lakes entirely contained within the state, the largest by area is Clear Lake, which covers 68 square miles (180 km^{2}).

Many of California's large lakes are actually reservoirs: artificial bodies of fresh water. In terms of both area and volume, the largest of these is Shasta Lake, which formed behind Shasta Dam in the 1940s. The dam can impound 4.552 million acre⋅ft (1.483 trillion US gal; 5.615 trillion L) of water over 29,740 acres (46.47 sq mi; 120.4 km^{2}).

Lake Elsinore, which covers 3,000 acres (4.7 sq mi; 12 km^{2}), is billed as the largest natural freshwater lake in Southern California.

== List ==
The list is alphabetized by the name of the lake, with the words lake, of, and the ignored. To sort on a different column, click on the arrows in the header row.

Geographic coordinates, approximate elevations, alternative names, and other details may be obtained by following the Geographic Names Information System links in the third column.

Note: Lakes grow and shrink due to precipitation, evaporation, releases, and diversions. For this reason, many of the surface areas tabulated below are very approximate. For reservoirs, the areas at maximum water storage are indicated. Reservoirs used for flood control are seldom allowed to reach maximum storage. Swimming, fishing, and/or boating are permitted in some of these lakes, but not all.

Name	California county(ies)	GNIS id(s)	Type (origin)	Surface area
Abbotts Lagoon	Marin	217942	natural lake (submerged valley)	200 acres (81 ha)
Adobe Reservoir	Lake County, California	1657212		
Almaden Reservoir	Santa Clara	218156	reservoir (Almaden Dam)	62 acres (25 ha)
Lake Almanor	Plumas	256197	reservoir (Lake Almanor Dam)	28,257 acres (11,435 ha)
Lake Aloha	El Dorado	256198	reservoir (Medley Lakes Dam)	627 acres (254 ha)
Lake Alpine	Alpine	218174	reservoir (Alpine CA00422 Dam)	179 acres (72 ha)
Alpine Lake	Marin	218169	reservoir (Alpine CA00204 Dam)	224 acres (91 ha)
Lake Amador	Amador	1664187	reservoir (Jackson Creek Dam)	385 acres (156 ha)
Anderson Lake	Santa Clara	218262	reservoir (Leroy Anderson Dam)	980 acres (400 ha)
Angora Lakes	El Dorado	256259	natural lakes (glacial tarns)	30 acres (12 ha)
Antelope Lake	Plumas	256274	reservoir (Antelope Dam)	931 acres (377 ha)
Antonelli Pond	Santa Cruz	1872809	reservoir (1908)	7 acres (2.8 ha)
Lake Anza	Contra Costa	218314	reservoir (C L Tilden Park Dam)	10 acres (4.0 ha)
Lake Arrowhead Reservoir	San Bernardino	269582	reservoir (Lake Arrowhead Dam)	780 acres (320 ha)
Atascadero Lake	San Luis Obispo	269606	reservoir	30 acres (12 ha)
Avonelle Lake	Tuolumne	218480	natural lake (alpine)	28 acres (11 ha)
Badwater Basin	Inyo	255963	natural dry lake (endorheic basin)	1,532 acres (620 ha)
Baker Lake	Shasta	256446	natural lake	10 acres (4.0 ha)
Lake Balboa	Los Angeles			27 acres (11 ha)
Baldwin Hills Reservoir	Los Angeles		former reservoir (Baldwin Hills Dam) breached in 1963	
Baldwin Lake	Los Angeles	1733490	natural lake	1 acre (0.40 ha)
Baldwin Lake	San Bernardino	269648	natural intermittent lake	692 acres (280 ha)
Balsam Forebay	Fresno		reservoir (Balsam Meadow Dam)	60 acres (24 ha)
Barker Reservoir	Riverside		reservoir (Barker Dam)	0.2 acres (0.081 ha)
Barnum Flat Reservoir	Siskiyou	218691	reservoir	371 acres (150 ha)
Bass Lake	Madera	266417	reservoir (Crane Valley Storage Dam)	1,165 acres (471 ha)
Bass Lake	Marin	233463	natural lake	6 acres (2.4 ha)
Bear Gulch Reservoir	San Mateo	218853	reservoir (Bear Gulch Dam)	25 acres (10 ha)
Bear River Reservoir	Amador	269748	reservoir (Bear River Dam)	149 acres (60 ha)
Beardsley Lake	Tuolumne	254593	reservoir (Beardsley Dam)	650 acres (260 ha)
Belvedere Lagoon	Marin	233490	artificial lagoon	66 acres (27 ha)
Lake Berryessa	Napa	255067	reservoir (Monticello Dam)	20,700 acres (8,400 ha)
Bethany Reservoir	Alameda	219098	reservoir (Bethany Forebay Dam)	169 acres (68 ha)
Beyers Lakes	Nevada	256864	natural lakes	12 acres (4.9 ha)
Bicycle Lake	San Bernardino	239276	natural dry lake (endorheic basin)	1,359 acres (550 ha)
Big Bear Lake	San Bernardino	269807	reservoir (Bear Valley Dam)	2,649 acres (1,072 ha)
Big Dry Creek Reservoir	Fresno		reservoir (Big Dry Creek Dam)	2,151 acres (870 ha)
Big Sage Reservoir	Modoc	219248	reservoir (Big Sage Dam)	5,270 acres (2,130 ha)
Big Tujunga Reservoir	Los Angeles	255960	reservoir (Big Tujunga No. 1 Dam)	83 acres (34 ha)
Black Butte Lake	Glenn and Tehama	254624	reservoir (Black Butte Dam)	4,560 acres (1,850 ha)
Blue Lakes	Lake County	219501	a string of two or three lakes	
Boca Reservoir	Nevada	219570	reservoir (Boca Dam)	977 acres (395 ha)
Bon Tempe Lake	Marin	219620	reservoir (Bon Tempe Dam)	140 acres (57 ha)
Borax Lake	Lake County	219659	the location of a prehistoric archaeological site	
Bouquet Reservoir	Los Angeles	269991	reservoir (Bouquet Canyon Dam)	628 acres (254 ha)
Bowman Lake	Nevada	257403	reservoir (Bowman Dam)	825 acres (334 ha)
Brea Reservoir	Orange	255959	reservoir (Brea Dam)	161 acres (65 ha)
Brickyard Cove Pond	Contra Costa		flooded quarry	4 acres (1.6 ha)
Bridgeport Reservoir	Mono	254662	reservoir (Bridgeport Dam)	3,125 acres (1,265 ha)
Briones Reservoir	Contra Costa	219847	reservoir (Briones Dam)	735 acres (297 ha)
Bristol Lake	San Bernardino	239688	natural dry lake (endorheic basin)	42,329 acres (17,130 ha)
Lake Britton	Shasta	257466	reservoir (Pit #3 Dam)	1,265 acres (512 ha)
Broadwell Lake	San Bernardino	239701	natural dry lake (endorheic basin)	2,348 acres (950 ha)
Brock Reservoir	Imperial		reservoir (2010)	485 acres (196 ha)
Brush Creek Reservoir	El Dorado	274935	reservoir (Brush Creek Dam)	22 acres (8.9 ha)
Bucks Lake	Plumas	266504	reservoir (Bucks Storage Dam)	1,827 acres (739 ha)
Buena Vista Lake	Kern	1683006	former natural lake drained in the mid 20th century	
Butt Valley Reservoir	Plumas	257757	reservoir (Butt Valley Dam)	1,600 acres (650 ha)
Butte Lake	Lassen	257771	natural lake	130 acres (53 ha)
Cachuma Lake	Santa Barbara	270134	reservoir (Bradbury Dam)	3,100 acres (1,300 ha)
Lake Cahuilla	Riverside	1849391	Reservoir	135 acres (55 ha)
Calaveras Reservoir	Alameda and Santa Clara	220379	reservoir (Calaveras Dam)	1,450 acres (590 ha)
Calero Reservoir	Santa Clara	220391	reservoir (Calero Dam)	337 acres (136 ha)
Lake Calero	Sacramento	2723901	reservoir (Calero Dam)	110 acres (45 ha)
Camanche Reservoir	Amador, Calaveras, and San Joaquin	254692	reservoir (Camanche Dam)	7,700 acres (3,100 ha)
Cambron Lake	Modoc	257837	natural lake (endorheic sink)	141 acres (57 ha)
Camp Far West Reservoir	Nevada, Placer, and Yuba	220455	reservoir (Camp Far West Dam)	2,050 acres (830 ha)
Camp Lake	Tuolumne	1682539	natural lake	6 acres (2.4 ha)
Canyon Lake	Riverside	273171	reservoir (Railroad Canyon Dam)	525 acres (212 ha)
Caples Lake	Alpine	257959	reservoir (Caples Lake Dam)	620 acres (250 ha)
Carbon Canyon Reservoir	Orange		reservoir (Carbon Canyon Dam)	221 acres (89 ha)
Lake Casitas	Ventura	240317	reservoir (Casitas Dam)	2,700 acres (1,100 ha)
Castaic Lake	Los Angeles	1802841	reservoir (Castaic Dam)	2,235 acres (904 ha)
Castac Lake	Kern	270333	natural lake	400 acres (160 ha)
Castle Lake	Siskiyou	220688	natural lake (glacial tarn)	47 acres (19 ha)
Cathedral Lakes	Mariposa	254722	natural lakes	65 acres (26 ha)
Cedar Lake	San Bernardino	270369	reservoir (Cedar Lake Dam)	3 acres (1.2 ha)
Lake Chabot	Alameda	220870	reservoir (Lake Chabot Dam)	61 acres (25 ha)
Charlotte Lake	Fresno	258222	natural lake	30 acres (12 ha)
Cherry Lake	Tuolumne	255077	reservoir (Cherry Valley Dam)	1,535 acres (621 ha)
Chesbro Reservoir	Santa Clara	220969	reservoir (Elmer J. Chesbro Dam)	328 acres (133 ha)
Clear Lake	Lake	258441	natural lake raised by Cache Creek Dam	43,800 acres (17,700 ha)
Clear Lake Reservoir	Modoc	221199	reservoir (Clear Lake Dam)	24,800 acres (10,000 ha)
Lake Clementine	Placer	264177	reservoir (North Fork CA10110 Dam)	279 acres (113 ha)
Clifton Court Forebay	Contra Costa	253867	reservoir (Clifton Court Forebay Dam)	2,500 acres (1,000 ha)
Cogswell Reservoir	Los Angeles	240748	reservoir (Cogswell Dam)	146 acres (59 ha)
Collins Lake	Yuba	1664159	reservoir (Virginia Ranch Dam)	975 acres (395 ha)
Concow Reservoir	Butte	258629	reservoir (Concow Dam)	486 acres (197 ha)
Contra Loma Reservoir	Contra Costa	221475	reservoir (Contra Loma Dam)	80 acres (32 ha)
Convict Lake	Mono	258663	natural lake	150 acres (61 ha)
Copco Lake	Siskiyou	221531	Natural lake, former name Lake Klamea name changed when dam was built (Copco No 1 Dam)	1,000 acres (400 ha)
Courtright Reservoir	Fresno	258786	reservoir (Courtright Dam)	1,480 acres (600 ha)
Coyote Lake	San Bernardino	241049	natural dry lake (endorheic basin)	9,257 acres (3,746 ha)
Coyote Lake	Santa Clara	221754	reservoir (Coyote Dam)	635 acres (257 ha)
Crowley Lake	Mono	233743	reservoir (Long Valley Dam)	5,280 acres (2,140 ha)
Crystal Lake	Los Angeles	241140	natural lake	4 acres (1.6 ha)
Crystal Springs Reservoir	San Mateo	234208 and 236879	reservoirs (Lower Crystal Springs Dam)	1,323 acres (535 ha)
Cuddeback Lake	San Bernardino	241156	natural dry lake (endorheic basin)	2,958 acres (1,197 ha)
Lake Cunningham	Santa Clara		reservoir (1979)	50 acres (20 ha)
Lake Cuyamaca	San Diego	270731	reservoir (Cuyamaca Dam)	110 acres (45 ha)
Danby Lake	San Bernardino	241249	natural dry lake (endorheic basin)	15,612 acres (6,318 ha)
Dark Lake	El Dorado	259063		15 acres (0.405 ha)
Lake Davis	Plumas	259098	reservoir (Grizzly Valley Dam)	4,026 acres (1,629 ha)
Lake De Sabla	Butte	276049	reservoir (Desabla Forebay 97-005 Dam)	22 acres (8.9 ha)
Deep Lake	Siskiyou	259194	natural lake	66 acres (27 ha)
Lake Del Valle	Alameda	254866	reservoir (Del Valle Dam)	1,060 acres (430 ha)
Diamond Valley Lake	Riverside	2358949	reservoir (Diamond Valley Lake Dam)	4,860 acres (1,970 ha)
Diaz Lake	Inyo	259354		80 acres (32 ha)
Dingleberry Lake	Inyo	259375	natural lake	4.7 acres (1.9 ha)
Dog Lake	Tuolumne	253685	natural lake	35 acres (14 ha)
Donovan Reservoir	Modoc	222495	reservoir (Donovan 179 Dam)	161 acres (65 ha)
Dorris Reservoir	Modoc	263719	reservoir (Dorris Dam)	1,060 acres (430 ha)
Dixon Reservoir	San Diego	1868662	reservoir (Dixon Dam)	69 acres (28 ha)
Dodge Reservoir	Lassen	222451	reservoir (Red Rock No. 1 Dam)	491 acres (199 ha)
Don Pedro Reservoir	Tuolumne	253880	reservoir (Don Pedro Dam)	12,960 acres (5,240 ha)
Donnell Lake	Tuolumne	259473	reservoir (Donnells Dam)	401 acres (162 ha)
Donner Lake	Nevada	1654915	natural lake (dammed by moraine) raised by Donner Lake Dam	960 acres (390 ha)
Duvall Lake	Napa	233812	reservoir (Duvall Dam)	17 acres (6.9 ha)
Eagle Lake	El Dorado	259661	natural lake	16 acres (6.5 ha)
Eagle Lake	Lassen	222812	natural lake (endorheic)	21,500 acres (8,700 ha)
Eagle Lake	Tulare	270966	natural lake	20 acres (8.1 ha)
Lake Earl	Del Norte	222843	natural lagoon	6,900 acres (2,800 ha)
East Park Reservoir	Colusa	266682	reservoir (East Park Dam)	1,820 acres (740 ha)
Eastman Lake	Madera and Mariposa	1664768	reservoir (Buchanan CA10243 Dam)	1,780 acres (720 ha)
Eaton Wash Reservoir	Los Angeles	1732268	flood-control reservoir (Eaton Wash Debris Basin Dam)	54 acres (22 ha)
Echo Lake	El Dorado	263013 and 268607	natural lakes raised by Echo Lake Dam	338 acres (137 ha)
Ediza Lake	Madera	222988	natural lake	20 acres (8.1 ha)
El Capitan Reservoir	San Diego	271028	reservoir (El Capitan Dam)	1,562 acres (632 ha)
Lake El Estero	Monterey	223040	natural lake	24 acres (9.7 ha)
El Mirage Lake	San Bernardino	241896	natural dry lake (endorheic basin)	3,240 acres (1,310 ha)
Lake El Toyonal	Contra Costa			1 acre (0.40 ha)
Elderberry Forebay	Los Angeles	255435	reservoir (Elderberry Forebay Dam)	450 acres (180 ha)
Lake Eleanor	Tuolumne	259830	reservoir (Lake Eleanor CA00121 Dam)	953 acres (386 ha)
Lake Eleanor	Ventura	241947	reservoir (Lake Eleanor CA00737 Dam)	9 acres (3.6 ha)
Lake Elizabeth	Alameda	1670278	reservoir (1960s)	83 acres (34 ha)
Elizabeth Lake	Los Angeles	241955	natural lake (sag pond)	160 acres (65 ha)
Ellis Lake	Yuba	223159		20 acres (8.1 ha)
Lake Elsinore	Riverside	271058	natural lake (sag pond)	3,000 acres (1,200 ha)
Lake Elsman	Santa Clara	233849	reservoir (Austrian Dam)	96 acres (39 ha)
Emerald Lake	Shasta	259892	natural lake	4 acres (1.6 ha)
Emerald Lake	Trinity	259893	natural lake	20 acres (8.1 ha)
Emerald Pool	Mariposa	253729	natural lake	1 acre (0.40 ha)
Emerson Lake	San Bernardino	242000	natural dry lake (endorheic basin)	
Encino Reservoir	Los Angeles	242035	reservoir (Encino Dam)	158 acres (64 ha)
Englebright Lake	Nevada and Yuba	233986	reservoir (Englebright Dam)	815 acres (330 ha)
Lake Evans	Kern	2359829		86 acres (35 ha)
Fallen Leaf Lake	El Dorado	260039	Natural lake Fallen Leaf Dam raised level	1,408 acres (570 ha)
Farmington Flood Control Basin	San Joaquin and Stanislaus	223403	flood-control reservoir (Farmington Dam)	4,100 acres (1,700 ha)
Flora Lake	Tuolumne	253468	natural lake	9 acres (3.6 ha)
Florence Lake	Fresno	266715	reservoir (Florence Lake Dam)	962 acres (389 ha)
Folsom Lake	El Dorado, Placer, and Sacramento	223648	reservoir (Folsom Dam)	11,450 acres (4,630 ha)
Foster Lake	Riverside	242393	reservoir	8.2 acres (3.3 ha)
Fountaingrove Lake	Sonoma	1799345	reservoir (Fountaingrove Dam)	33 acres (13 ha)
Fowler Lake	Plumas	260318	natural lake	6.5 acres (2.6 ha)
Francis Lake	El Dorado	260334	natural lake	3 acres (1.2 ha)
French Lake Reservoir	Nevada	260397	reservoir (French Lake Dam)	337 acres (136 ha)
French Meadows Reservoir	Placer	260398	reservoir (L L Anderson Dam)	1,344 acres (544 ha)
Frenchman Lake	Plumas	260408	reservoir (Frechman Dam)	1,580 acres (640 ha)
Lake Fulmor	Riverside	271248	reservoir	4 acres (1.6 ha)
Gibraltar Reservoir	Santa Barbara	242698	reservoir (Gibraltar Dam)	335 acres (136 ha)
Gilmore Lake	El Dorado	260569	natural lake	72 acres (29 ha)
Goldstone Lake	San Bernardino	242834	natural dry lake	1,260 acres (510 ha)
Goose Lake	Modoc	224325	natural intermittent lake (glacial)	94,000 acres (38,000 ha)
Grant Lake	Mono	260769	reservoir (Grant Lake Dam)	1,095 acres (443 ha)
Grass Lake	Siskiyou	260790	natural swamp	846 acres (342 ha)
Green Place Reservoir	Modoc and Shasta	276610	former reservoir	173 acres (70 ha)
Green Valley Lake	San Bernardino	271429	reservoir (Green Valley Dam)	22 acres (8.9 ha)
Lake Gregory	San Bernardino	243030	reservoir (Lake Gregory Dam)	88 acres (36 ha)
Grizzly Lake	Plumas	1666503	natural lake	15 acres (6.1 ha)
Grizzly Forebay	Plumas	233965	reservoir (Grizzly Forebay 94-003 Dam)	74 acres (30 ha)
Guadalupe Reservoir	Santa Clara	233968	reservoir (Guadelupe Dam)	75 acres (30 ha)
Hansen Flood Control Basin	Los Angeles	243179	flood-control reservoir (Hansen Recreational Lake Dam)	11 acres (4.5 ha)
Harper Lake	San Bernardino	243239	natural dry lake	6,207 acres (2,512 ha)
Lake Havasu	San Bernardino	243280	reservoir (Parker Dam)	20,400 acres (8,300 ha)
Lake Helen	Shasta	261236	natural lake (glacial tarn)	25 acres (10 ha)
Hell Hole Reservoir	Placer	261246 and 1664177	reservoir (Lower Hell Hole Dam)	1,250 acres (510 ha)
Lake Hemet	Riverside	271544	reservoir (Lake Hemet Dam)	470 acres (190 ha)
Lake Hennessey	Napa	234004	reservoir (Conn Creek Dam)	790 acres (320 ha)
Lake Henshaw	San Diego	271554	reservoir (Henshaw Dam)	2,000 acres (810 ha)
Hensley Lake	Madera	1664770	reservoir (Hidden Dam)	1,500 acres (610 ha)
Hernandez Reservoir	San Benito	243384	reservoir (Hernandez Dam)	590 acres (240 ha)
Hesperia Lake	San Bernardino			12 acres (4.9 ha)
Hetch Hetchy Reservoir	Tuolumne	261289	reservoir (O'Shaughnessy Dam)	1,972 acres (798 ha)
Hidden Valley Lake	Lake	1657219	reservoir	98 acres (40 ha)
Highland Springs Reservoir	Lake	1657213		
Hilltop Lake	Contra Costa		natural lagoon	4 acres (1.6 ha)
Lake Hodges	San Diego	255549	reservoir (Lake Hodges Dam)	1,317 acres (533 ha)
Hog Flat Reservoir	Lassen	1652823	reservoir (Hog Flat Dam)	1,000 acres (400 ha)
Hollywood Reservoir	Los Angeles	243553	reservoir (Mulholland Dam)	82 acres (33 ha)
Honey Lake	Lassen	266813	natural lake (endorheic sink)	47,000 acres (19,000 ha)
Horseshoe Lake	Shasta	261530	natural lake	70 acres (28 ha)
Horseshoe Lake	Alameda		flooded quarry	100 acres (40 ha)
Howard Lake	Mendocino	225698	natural lake	1 acre (0.40 ha)
Howard Lake	Mendocino	261574	natural lake	20 acres (8.1 ha)
Hughes Lake	Los Angeles	243724	natural lake (sag pond)	15 acres (6.1 ha)
Hume Lake	Fresno	261620	reservoir (Hume Lake Dam)	85 acres (34 ha)
Huntington Lake	Fresno	266841	reservoir (Huntington Lake 1 Dam)	1,441 acres (583 ha)
Lake Ilsanjo	Sonoma	1799358	reservoir (1950s)	26 acres (11 ha)
Imperial Reservoir	Imperial	243787	reservoir (Imperial Diversion Dam)	7,300 acres (3,000 ha)
Indian Tom Lake	Siskiyou	261769		500 acres (200 ha)
Indian Valley Reservoir	Lake	274690	reservoir (Indian Valley Dam)	4,000 acres (1,600 ha)
Iron Canyon Reservoir	Shasta	253142	reservoir (Iron Canyon Dam)	510 acres (210 ha)
Iron Gate Reservoir	Siskiyou	261813	reservoir (Iron Gate Dam)	1,000 acres (400 ha)
Irvine Lake	Orange	1663533	reservoir (Santiago Creek Dam)	650 acres (260 ha)
Isabella Lake	Kern	271737	reservoir (Isabella Dam)	11,400 acres (4,600 ha)
Ivanhoe Reservoir	Los Angeles	243938	reservoir (1906)	10 acres (4.0 ha)
Ivanpah Lake	San Bernardino	243940	natural dry lake (endorheic basin)	890 acres (360 ha)
Jackson Lake	Los Angeles	271757	sag pond	7 acres (2.8 ha)
Jackson Meadows Reservoir	Nevada and Sierra	274655	reservoir (Jackson Meadows Dam)	938 acres (380 ha)
Jenkinson Lake	El Dorado	254837	reservoir (Sly Park Dam)	677 acres (274 ha)
Jenks Lake	San Bernardino	271781	reservoir	6 acres (2.4 ha)
Lake Jennings	San Diego	244046	reservoir (Chet Harritt Dam)	176 acres (71 ha)
Jewel Lake	Contra Costa	226225	reservoir (1922)	1 acre (0.40 ha)
June Lake	Mono	262048	natural lake (subalpine)	120 acres (49 ha)
Juniper Lake	Lassen and Plumas	262053	natural lake (glacial)	400 acres (160 ha)
Kangaroo Lake	Siskiyou	226425	natural lake	21 acres (8.5 ha)
Lake Kaweah	Tulare	255512	reservoir (Terminus Dam)	1,945 acres (787 ha)
Kent Lake	Marin	226521 and 1663440	reservoir (Peters Dam)	431 acres (174 ha)
Kern Lake	Kern	255514	former natural lake drained in the 19th century	
Kesterson Reservoir	Merced		former drainage reservoirs (1971) now wetlands	
Keswick Reservoir	Shasta	1664622	reservoir (Keswick Dam)	640 acres (260 ha)
Kibbie Lake	Tuolumne	262163	natural lake	100 acres (40 ha)
Koehn Lake	Kern	244357	natural dry lake (endorheic basin)	7,295 acres (2,952 ha)
La Grange Reservoir	Stanislaus and Tuolumne	226728	reservoir (La Grange Dam)	58 acres (23 ha)
Lafayette Reservoir	Contra Costa	226751	reservoir (Lafayette Dam)	126 acres (51 ha)
Lago Los Osos	Alameda		flooded quarry	80 acres (32 ha)
Laguna Blanca	Santa Barbara	271952	natural lake	6 acres (2.4 ha)
Laguna Honda Reservoir	San Francisco	226775	reservoir	5 acres (2.0 ha)
Laguna Lake	Marin and Sonoma	226778	natural intermittent lake	350 acres (140 ha)
Laguna Lakes	Orange	244520	natural lakes	20 acres (8.1 ha)
Laguna Seca	Santa Clara	1670811	former natural lake	
Lake Lagunita	Santa Clara	226786	reservoir (Lagunita Dam)	37 acres (15 ha)
Lake Lagunitas	Marin	226790	reservoir (Lagunitas Dam)	22 acres (8.9 ha)
Lake Leavitt	Lassen	272010	reservoir (Lake Leavitt Dam)	1,142 acres (462 ha)
Lee Lake	Riverside	272013	reservoir (Lee Lake Dam)	70 acres (28 ha)
Lewiston Lake	Trinity	254908	reservoir (Lewiston Dam)	750 acres (300 ha)
Lexington Reservoir	Santa Clara	227053	reservoir (James J. Lenihan Dam)	450 acres (180 ha)
Lincoln Park Lake	Los Angeles			2 acres (0.81 ha)
Little Grass Valley Reservoir	Plumas	262610	reservoir (Little Grass Valley Dam)	1,433 acres (580 ha)
Lloyd Lake	San Francisco	227443	reservoir	1 acre (0.40 ha)
Loch Leven	Inyo	262760	natural lake	7 acres (2.8 ha)
Loch Leven Lakes	Placer	262761	natural lakes	6 acres (2.4 ha)
Loch Lomond	Santa Cruz	227451	reservoir (Newell Dam)	172 acres (70 ha)
Lake of the Lone Indian	Fresno	262797	natural lake	12 acres (4.9 ha)
Loon Lake	El Dorado	254937	natural lake raised by Loon Lake Dam	1,450 acres (590 ha)
Lopez Lake	San Luis Obispo	255632	reservoir (Lopez Dam)	950 acres (380 ha)
Los Vaqueros Reservoir	Contra Costa		reservoir (Los Vaqueros Dam)	1,480 acres (600 ha)
Lost Lake	El Dorado	227707	natural lake	2 acres (0.81 ha)
Lost Lake	Riverside	245215	natural lake	5 acres (2.0 ha)
Lost Lake	San Bernardino	272243	sag pond	
Lake Loveland	San Diego	272249	reservoir (Lake Loveland Dam)	454 acres (184 ha)
Lower Alkali Lake	Modoc	263026	natural lake (endorheic sink)	9,257 acres (3,746 ha)
Lower Bear Reservoir	Amador	272252	reservoir (Lower Bear River Dam)	710 acres (290 ha)
Lower Klamath Lake	Siskiyou	263023	natural lake	12,000 acres (4,900 ha)
Lower Otay Reservoir	San Diego	245268	reservoir (Savage Dam)	1,110 acres (450 ha)
Lower Roberts Reservoir	Modoc	263039	reservoir (Roberts 157-002 Dam)	544 acres (220 ha)
Lucerne Lake	San Bernardino	245282	natural dry lake (endorheic basin)	4,463 acres (1,806 ha)
Lukens Lake	Tuolumne	227838		
Lyons Reservoir	Tuolumne	227869	reservoir (Lyons Dam)	184 acres (74 ha)
Magalia Reservoir	Butte	263115	reservoir (Magalia 73 Dam)	134 acres (54 ha)
Malibu Lake	Los Angeles	256060	reservoir (Malibu Lake Club Dam)	55 acres (22 ha)
Malibu Reservoir	Los Angeles	256062	reservoir (Rindge Dam)	4 acres (1.6 ha)
Mammoth Pool Reservoir	Fresno and Madera	266964	reservoir (Mammoth Pool Dam)	1,100 acres (450 ha)
Lake Manix	San Bernardino		former natural lake (glacial)	
Lake Manly	Inyo		former natural lake (endorheic rift)	
Manzanita Lake	Shasta	263161	natural lake (dammed by landslide)	30 acres (12 ha)
Martha Lake	Fresno	263232	natural lake	90 acres (36 ha)
Martis Creek Lake	Nevada	1655186	reservoir (Martis Creek Dam)	768 acres (311 ha)
Mary Lake	Shasta	223361	reservoir	10 acres (4.0 ha)
Lake Mathews	Riverside	271966	reservoir (Mathews Dam)	2,750 acres (1,110 ha)
May Lake	Mariposa	228255	natural lake	40 acres (16 ha)
Lake McCloud	Shasta and Siskiyou	1655181	reservoir (McCloud Dam)	520 acres (210 ha)
Lake McClure	Mariposa	245652	reservoir (New Exchequer Dam)	7,147 acres (2,892 ha)
McCoy Flat Reservoir	Lassen	263327	reservoir (McCoy Flat Dam)	1,800 acres (730 ha)
McKay's Point Reservoir	Calaveras		reservoir (McKay's Point Diversion Dam)	35 acres (14 ha)
Meiss Lake	Siskiyou	263447	natural lake (endorheic)	3,750 acres (1,520 ha)
Lake Mendocino	Mendocino	228503	reservoir (Coyote Valley Dam)	1,922 acres (778 ha)
Lake Merced	San Francisco	228515	natural lake (dammed by sand bar)	266 acres (108 ha)
Lake Merritt	Alameda	234279	natural inlet dammed in the 1860s	155 acres (63 ha)
Middle Alkali Lake	Modoc	263491	natural lake (endorheic sink)	19,506 acres (7,894 ha)
Miller/Knox Lagoon	Contra Costa		flooded quarries	3 acres (1.2 ha)
Millerton Lake	Fresno and Madera	263643	reservoir (Friant Dam)	4,900 acres (2,000 ha)
Mills Lake	Inyo	263652	natural lake	4 acres (1.6 ha)
Minaret Lake	Madera	263664	natural lake	35 acres (14 ha)
Lake Ming	Kern	1839119	reservoir (Kern River County Park Dam)	113 acres (46 ha)
Miramar Reservoir	San Diego	245983	reservoir (Miramar Dam)	162 acres (66 ha)
Mirror Lake	Mariposa	253549	natural lake (glacial)	8 acres (3.2 ha)
Lake Mission Viejo	Orange	1765671	reservoir (Lake Mission Viejo Dam)	150 acres (61 ha)
Modesto Reservoir	Stanislaus	263718	reservoir (Modesto Dam)	3,800 acres (1,500 ha)
Lake Mojave	San Bernardino		former natural lake (glacial)	
Moon Lake	Lassen	1664284	reservoir (Tule Lake Dam)	2,650 acres (1,070 ha)
Mono Lake	Mono	263749	natural lake (endorheic)	55,179 acres (22,330 ha)
Morena Reservoir	San Diego	272555	reservoir (Morena Dam)	1,475 acres (597 ha)
Morris Reservoir	Los Angeles	272561	reservoir (Morris Dam)	420 acres (170 ha)
Mosquito Lake	Modoc	229114	natural lake	106 acres (43 ha)
Mountain Meadows Reservoir	Lassen	229192	reservoir (Indian Ole Dam)	5,800 acres (2,300 ha)
Mountain Lake	San Francisco		natural lake	4 acres (1.6 ha)
Mud Lake	various counties			
Munz Lakes	Los Angeles	246372	natural lake (sag pond)	8 acres (3.2 ha)
Murphy Lake	Plumas	229353	natural lake	3 acres (1.2 ha)
Murphy Lake	Sutter	1703408	former natural lake	
Lake Murray	San Diego	246390	reservoir (Murray Dam)	171.1 acres (69.2 ha)
Mystic Lake	Riverside		natural lake	200 acres (81 ha)
Lake Nacimiento	San Luis Obispo	255655	reservoir (Nacimiento Dam)	5,400 acres (2,200 ha)
Naraghi Lake	Stanislaus	1816946	reservoir (1980)	13 acres (5.3 ha)
Lake Natoma	Sacramento	255111	reservoir (Nimbus Dam)	540 acres (220 ha)
Nelson Lake	San Bernardino	246469	natural dry lake (endorheic basin)	445 acres (180 ha)
New Bullards Bar Reservoir	Yuba	267058	reservoir (New Bullards Bar Dam)	4,810 acres (1,950 ha)
New Hogan Lake	Calaveras	254970	reservoir (New Hogan Dam)	4,410 acres (1,780 ha)
New Melones Lake	Calaveras and Tuolumne	253643	reservoir (New Melones Dam)	12,500 acres (5,100 ha)
New Spicer Meadow Reservoir	Tuolumne	235195	reservoir (New Spicer Meadow Dam)	1,998 acres (809 ha)
Nicasio Reservoir	Marin	229536	reservoir (Seeger Dam)	845 acres (342 ha)
Lake Norconian	Riverside	244532	artificial lake	60 acres (24 ha)
Nüümü Hu Hupi	Fresno	267633	natural lake	4 acres (1.6 ha)
Olivenhain Reservoir	San Diego	2725785	reservoir (Olivehain Dam)	203 acres (82 ha)
O'Neill Forebay	Merced	254988	reservoir (O'Neill Dam)	2,250 acres (910 ha)
Lake Oroville	Butte	264404	reservoir (Oroville Dam)	15,805 acres (6,396 ha)
Oso Flaco Lake	San Luis Obispo	246997	natural lake	75 acres (30 ha)
Ostrander Lake	Mariposa	264410	natural lake	18 acres (7.3 ha)
Owens Lake	Inyo	272820	natural dry lake	64,420 acres (26,070 ha)
Pacheco Reservoir	Santa Clara	230195	reservoir (North Fork CA00299 Dam)	197 acres (80 ha)
Pacoima Reservoir	Los Angeles	247091 and 276706	reservoir (Pacoima Dam)	68 acres (28 ha)
Lake Palmdale	Los Angeles	272852	reservoir (Harold Reservoir Dam)	218 acres (88 ha)
Paradise Lake	Butte	276535	reservoir (Paradise 73-002 Dam)	244 acres (99 ha)
Pardee Reservoir	Amador and Calaveras	230339	reservoir (Pardee Dam)	2,134 acres (864 ha)
Peeler Lake	Mono	1652854	natural lake	70 acres (28 ha)
Pee Wee Lake	Inyo	1667281	natural lake	0.7 acres (0.28 ha)
Lake Perris	Riverside	247390	reservoir (Perris Dam)	2,340 acres (950 ha)
Petaluma Reservoir	Sonoma	230559	reservoir (Lawler Dam)	10 acres (4.0 ha)
Philbrook Reservoir	Butte	264680	reservoir (Philbrook 97-008 Dam)	257 acres (104 ha)
Lake Pillsbury	Lake	234468	reservoir (Scott Dam)	2,000 acres (810 ha)
Pine Flat Lake	Fresno	252091	reservoir (Pine Flat Dam)	5,970 acres (2,420 ha)
Pinecrest Lake	Tuolumne	253755	reservoir (Main Strawberry Dam)	300 acres (120 ha)
Lake Piru	Ventura	273032	reservoir (Santa Felicia Dam)	1,240 acres (500 ha)
Pit Six Reservoir	Shasta	276966	reservoir (Pit #6 Dam)	265 acres (107 ha)
Pit 7 Reservoir	Shasta	276757	reservoir (Pit No. 7 Dam)	470 acres (190 ha)
Piute Ponds	Los Angeles	247586	reservoir (dike)	1,038 acres (420 ha)
Point Potrero Pond	Contra Costa		flooded quarry	1 acre (0.40 ha)
Lake Poway	San Diego	1868884	reservoir (Lake Poway Dam)	35 acres (14 ha)
Prado Reservoir	Riverside and San Bernardino	247767	flood-control reservoir (Prado Dam)	6,695 acres (2,709 ha)
Prosser Creek Reservoir	Nevada	1654936	reservoir (Prosser Creek Dam)	734 acres (297 ha)
Puddingstone Reservoir	Los Angeles	247810	reservoir (Puddingstone Dam)	490 acres (200 ha)
Pyramid Lake	Los Angeles	273141	reservoir (Pyramid Dam)	1,360 acres (550 ha)
Pyramid Lake	El Dorado	265076	natural lake	9 acres (3.6 ha)
Quail Lake	Los Angeles	273146	reservoir	120 acres (49 ha)
Rae Lakes	Fresno	265129	natural lakes	100 acres (40 ha)
Rainbow Lake	Alameda	2761817	flooded quarry	40 acres (16 ha)
Raker and Thomas Reservoirs	Modoc	267153	reservoirs (Big Dobe North Dam, Big Dobe South Dam)	2,400 acres (970 ha)
Lake Ralphine	Sonoma	231194	reservoir (Lake Ralphine Dam)	19 acres (7.7 ha)
Lake Ramona	San Diego		reservoir (Lake Ramona Dam)	155 acres (63 ha)
Rancho Seco Lake	Sacramento		reservoir (Rancho Seco Dam)	165 acres (67 ha)
Rector Reservoir	Napa	234548	reservoir (Rector Creek Dam)	82 acres (33 ha)
Red Pass Lake	San Bernardino	248065	natural dry lake (endorheic basin)	865 acres (350 ha)
Redinger Lake	Fresno and Madera	1667441	reservoir (Big Creek No. 7 Dam)	465 acres (188 ha)
Roberts Lake	Sonoma	1799646	reservoir	5 acres (2.0 ha)
Rodeo Lagoon	Marin	231805	natural lake (submerged valley)	25 acres (10 ha)
Rogers Dry Lake	Kern	248327	natural dry lake (endorheic basin)	20,058 acres (8,117 ha)
Rogers Lake	Plumas	1666525	natural lake	7 acres (2.8 ha)
Rosamond Lake	Kern and Los Angeles	248369	natural dry lake (endorheic basin)	13,106 acres (5,304 ha)
Ruth Reservoir	Trinity	232057	reservoir (Robert W Matthews Dam)	2,750 acres (1,110 ha)
Lake Sabrina	Inyo	265702	reservoir (Sabrina Dam)	184 acres (74 ha)
Salt Spring Valley Reservoir	Calaveras	232340	reservoir (Salt Springs Valley Dam)	920 acres (370 ha)
Salt Springs Reservoir	Amador and Calaveras	273425	reservoir (Salt Springs Dam)	975 acres (395 ha)
Salton Sea	Imperial and Riverside	248771	natural basin (endorheic rift) flooded since 1905	240,000 acres (97,000 ha)
San Andreas Lake	San Mateo	253895	reservoir (San Andreas Dam)	550 acres (220 ha)
Lake San Antonio	Monterey and San Luis Obispo	254200	reservoir (San Antonio CA00813 Dam)	5,720 acres (2,310 ha)
San Antonio Reservoir	Alameda	232370	reservoir (James H Turner Dam)	825 acres (334 ha)
San Antonio Reservoir	San Bernardino		reservoir (San Antonio CA10023 Dam)	793 acres (321 ha)
San Gabriel Reservoir	Los Angeles	273481	reservoir (San Gabriel No 1 Dam)	560 acres (230 ha)
San Joaquin Reservoir	Orange	248867	reservoir (San Joaquin Reservoir Dam)	50 acres (20 ha)
San Justo Reservoir	San Benito	1817294	reservoir (San Justo Dam)	202 acres (82 ha)
San Luis Reservoir	Merced	232446	reservoir (B. F. Sisk Dam)	13,000 acres (5,300 ha)
San Pablo Reservoir	Contra Costa	232459	reservoir (San Pablo Dam)	854 acres (346 ha)
San Vicente Reservoir	San Diego	248974	reservoir (San Vicente Dam)	1,680 acres (680 ha)
Santa Anita Reservoir	Los Angeles		reservoir (Big Santa Anita Dam)	17 acres (6.9 ha)
Santa Fe Reservoir	Los Angeles	249064	flood-control reservoir (Santa Fe Dam)	1,079 acres (437 ha)
Santa Margarita Lake	San Luis Obispo	273557	reservoir (Salinas Dam)	793 acres (321 ha)
Santa Rosa Creek Reservoir	Sonoma	232564	reservoir (Santa Rosa Creek Reservoir Dam)	154 acres (62 ha)
Sapphire Lake	Trinity	232574	natural lake	15 acres (6.1 ha)
Scotts Flat Reservoir	Nevada	265944	reservoir (Scotts Flat Dam)	725 acres (293 ha)
Searles Lake	San Bernardino	1655010	natural dry lake (endorheic basin)	
Searsville Lake	San Mateo	232764	reservoir (Searsville Dam)	90 acres (36 ha)
Senator Wash Reservoir	Imperial	1664675	reservoir (Senator Wash Dam)	240 acres (97 ha)
Sepulveda Flood Control Basin	Los Angeles	1655151	flood-control reservoir (Sepulveda Dam)	1,340 acres (540 ha)
Serene Lakes	Placer	254806	natural lake	77 acres (31 ha)
Seven Oaks Reservoir	San Bernardino		flood-control reservoir (Seven Oaks Dam)	177 acres (72 ha)
Lake Shasta	Shasta	253897	reservoir (Shasta Dam)	29,740 acres (12,040 ha)
Lake Shastina	Siskiyou	267233	reservoir (Shasta River Dam)	1,850 acres (750 ha)
Shaver Lake	Fresno	266058	reservoir (Shaver Lake Dam)	2,177 acres (881 ha)
Lake Sherwood	Ventura	249402	reservoir (Lake Sherwood Dam)	163 acres (66 ha)
Shinn Pond	Alameda	2761820	flooded quarry	25 acres (10 ha)
Silver Lake	Amador	267250	reservoir (Silver Lake CA00377 Dam)	385 acres (156 ha)
Silver Lake Reservoir	Los Angeles	249479	reservoir (Silver Lake CA00081 Dam)	77 acres (31 ha)
Silver Lake	San Bernardino	249474	natural dry lake (endorheic basin)	7,240 acres (2,930 ha)
Silverwood Lake	San Bernardino	249498	reservoir (Cedar Springs Dam)	990 acres (400 ha)
Lake Siskiyou	Siskiyou	276818	reservoir (Box Canyon Dam)	430 acres (170 ha)
Skinner Reservoir	Riverside	249541	reservoir (Skinner Clearwell Dam)	1,400 acres (570 ha)
Slab Creek Reservoir	El Dorado	233229	reservoir (Slab Creek Dam)	249 acres (101 ha)
Sly Creek Reservoir	Butte	233303	reservoir (Sly Creek Dam)	563 acres (228 ha)
Smith Lake	Plumas	266329	natural lake	63 acres (25 ha)
Snag Lake	Lassen	267285	natural lake	300 acres (120 ha)
Snake Lake	Plumas	267292	natural lake	271 acres (110 ha)
Soda Lake	San Bernardino	249636	natural dry lake (endorheic basin)	19,376 acres (7,841 ha)
Soda Lake	San Luis Obispo	273796	natural alkali lake (endorheic basin)	2,717 acres (1,100 ha)
Lake Sonoma	Sonoma	234892	reservoir (Warm Springs Dam)	3,600 acres (1,500 ha)
South Lake	Inyo	267526	reservoir (South Lake Reservoir)	181 acres (73 ha)
Lake Spaulding	Nevada	267558	reservoir (Lake Spaulding Dam)	698 acres (282 ha)
Spreckels Lake	San Francisco	235220	reservoir	5.9 acres (2.4 ha)
Spring Creek Reservoir	Shasta	276984	reservoir (Spring Creek Dam)	87 acres (35 ha)
Square Lake	Tehama	235298	natural lake (tarn)	0.7 acres (0.28 ha)
Stafford Lake	Marin	235342	reservoir (Novato Creek Dam)	195 acres (79 ha)
Stampede Reservoir	Sierra	267662	reservoir (Stampede Dam)	3,450 acres (1,400 ha)
Stanford Lake	Mono	267667	natural lake	5 acres (2.0 ha)
Statue Lake	Siskiyou	267704	natural lake (tarn)	1.1 acres (0.45 ha)
Stevens Creek Reservoir	Santa Clara	235454	reservoir (Stevens Creek Dam)	95 acres (38 ha)
Stone Canyon Reservoir	Los Angeles	249950	reservoir (Stone Canyon Dam)	138 acres (56 ha)
Stony Gorge Reservoir	Glenn	267786	reservoir (Stony Gorge Dam)	1,280 acres (520 ha)
Lake Success	Tulare	254314	reservoir (Success Dam)	2,450 acres (990 ha)
Sugar Pine Reservoir	Placer	274923	reservoir (Sugar Pine Dam)	161 acres (65 ha)
Sulphur Creek Reservoir	Orange	250042	reservoir (Sulphur Creek Dam)	40 acres (16 ha)
Summit Lake	Shasta	253947	natural lake	7 acres (2.8 ha)
Sunset Reservoir	San Francisco	235813	reservoir (Sunset North Basin Dam)	12 acres (4.9 ha)
Superior Lake	San Bernardino	250143	natural dry lake	1,680 acres (680 ha)
Lake Suttonfield	Sonoma	253226	reservoir (Suttenfield Dam)	24 acres (9.7 ha)
Sweetwater Reservoir	San Diego	273984	reservoir (Sweetwater Main Dam)	936 acres (379 ha)
Lake Tahoe	El Dorado and Placer	1654975	natural lake raised by Lake Tahoe Dam	122,000 acres (49,000 ha)
Lake Temescal	Alameda	236093	reservoir (Lake Temescal Dam)	15 acres (6.1 ha)
Tenaya Lake	Mariposa	255125	natural lake (alpine)	100 acres (40 ha)
Thermalito Afterbay	Butte	236232	reservoir (Thermalito Afterbay Dam)	4,302 acres (1,741 ha)
Thermalito Forebay	Butte	236234	reservoir (Thermalito Forebay Dam)	630 acres (250 ha)
Lake Thomas A Edison	Fresno	274108	reservoir (Vermilion Valley Dam)	1,878 acres (760 ha)
Thousand Island Lake	Madera	268247	natural lake (alpine)	120 acres (49 ha)
Three Lakes	Plumas	268256	reservoir	42 acres (17 ha)
Thurston Lake	Lake County	236335		
Timber Lake	Lake	268286	natural lake	0.8 acres (0.32 ha)
Tinemaha Reservoir	Inyo	236383	reservoir (Tinemaha Dam)	2,098 acres (849 ha)
Tioga Lake	Mono	236388	reservoir (Tioga Lake Dam)	73 acres (30 ha)
Tolay Lake	Sonoma		natural lake partly drained in the 19th century	200 acres (81 ha)
Toluca Lake	Los Angeles	250527	natural lake	4 acres (1.6 ha)
Topaz Lake	Mono	861754	natural lake raised by diversions and levees	2,410 acres (980 ha)
Trinity Lake	Trinity	255079	reservoir (Trinity Dam)	16,535 acres (6,691 ha)
Lake Tuendae	San Bernardino		reservoir (1955)	1.4 acres (0.57 ha)
Tulare Lake	Kings	255799	former natural lake drained in the late 19th century	
Tule Lake	Lake County	236603		
Tule Lake	Modoc and Siskiyou	268456	natural intermittent lake	13,000 acres (5,300 ha)
Tulloch Reservoir	Calaveras	255161	reservoir (Tulloch Dam)	1,260 acres (510 ha)
Turlock Lake	Stanislaus	236644	reservoir (Turlock Lake Dam)	3,260 acres (1,320 ha)
Twain Harte Lake	Tuolumne		reservoir (Twain Harte Dam)	12 acres (4.9 ha)
Twin Lakes	Mono	268523	natural lakes	40 acres (16 ha)
Twitchell Reservoir	San Luis Obispo and Santa Barbara	255810	reservoir (Twitchell Dam)	3,700 acres (1,500 ha)
Ukonom Lake	Siskiyou	236762	reservoir	67 acres (27 ha)
Una Lake	Los Angeles	274266	sag pond	
Union Valley Reservoir	El Dorado	268592	reservoir (Union Valley Dam)	2,575 acres (1,042 ha)
Upper Alkali Lake	Modoc	1654148	natural lake (endorheic sink)	28,862 acres (11,680 ha)
Uvas Reservoir	Santa Clara	236945	reservoir (Uvas Dam)	280 acres (110 ha)
Vail Lake	Riverside	250880	reservoir (Vail Dam)	1,078 acres (436 ha)
Lake Van Arsdale	Mendocino	236993	reservoir (Van Arsdale Dam)	163 acres (66 ha)
Vasona Reservoir	Santa Clara	237032	reservoir (Vasona Percolating Dam)	58 acres (23 ha)
Lake Vernon	Tuolumne	253624	natural lake	40 acres (16 ha)
Lake Virginia	Fresno	268711	natural lake	70 acres (28 ha)
Virginia Lakes	Mono	268708	natural lakes	50 acres (20 ha)
Waca Lake	El Dorado	268722	natural lake	4 acres (1.6 ha)
Lake Webb	Kern	2359809		873 acres (353 ha)
West Valley Reservoir	Lassen and Modoc	237535	reservoir (West Valley Dam)	1,050 acres (420 ha)
Whale Rock Reservoir	San Luis Obispo	274456	reservoir (Whale Rock Dam)	594 acres (240 ha)
Whiskeytown Lake	Shasta	268967	reservoir (Whiskeytown Dam)	3,220 acres (1,300 ha)
Whitehorse Flat Reservoir	Modoc and Siskiyou	255233	reservoir	2,100 acres (850 ha)
Whitfield Reservoir	Alameda		reservoir	
Whittier Narrows Reservoir	Los Angeles	1940055	flood-control reservoir (Whittier Narrows Dam)	2,500 acres (1,000 ha)
Lake Wishon	Fresno	269260	reservoir (Wishon Dam)	970 acres (390 ha)
Lake Wohlford	San Diego	255889	reservoir (Lake Wohlford Dam)	225 acres (91 ha)
Lake of the Woods	El Dorado	269306	natural lake (glacial)	35 acres (14 ha)
Woodward Reservoir	Stanislaus	238176	reservoir (Woodward Dam)	2,427 acres (982 ha)
Wrights Lake	El Dorado	269322	natural lake	45 acres (18 ha)
Lake Yosemite	Merced	233393	reservoir (Lake Yosemite Dam)	500 acres (200 ha)

== See also ==
- Geography of California
- List of dams and reservoirs in California
- List of lakes in the San Francisco Bay Area
- List of lakes of the Colorado Desert
- List of lakes in the United States
- List of largest reservoirs of California
- List of rivers of California
- Water in California
