= Moore Creek =

Moore Creek may refer to the following creeks:

- Moore Creek (Nipissing District), Ontario, Canada
- Moore Creek (Timiskaming District), Ontario, Canada
- Moore Creek (California), United States

== See also ==
- Moores Creek (Reedy Fork tributary), Virginia, United States
- Mores Creek, Idaho, United States
