= Deep Lake =

Deep Lake may refer to:

== Antarctica ==
- Deep Lake (Ross Island), a lake north of Cape Barne, Ross Island
- Deep Lake (Vestfold Hills, Antarctica), a hypersaline lake in the Vestfold Hills region of Antarctica

== United States ==
- Deep Lake (California), a lake in Siskiyou County
- Deep Lake (Colorado), a lake in White River National Forest
- Deep Lake (Florida), a natural sinkhole in Big Cypress National Preserve
- Deep Lake (Oregon), several lakes
- Deep Lake (Thurston County, Washington), a lake in Millersylvania State Park
- Deep Lake (King County, Washington), a lake in Nolte State Park
