= Quarry Lake (disambiguation) =

A quarry lake is a lake that is formed after a quarry has been dug through a mining operation.

Quarry Lake may also refer to:

- Quarry Lake (Nova Scotia), a lake in Halifax, Nova Scotia
- Quarry Lake (Maryland), a lake in Pikesville, Maryland
- Quarry Lakes Regional Recreation Area in Fremont, California
