= Imperial Reservoir =

Reservoir on the Colorado River in California and Arizona

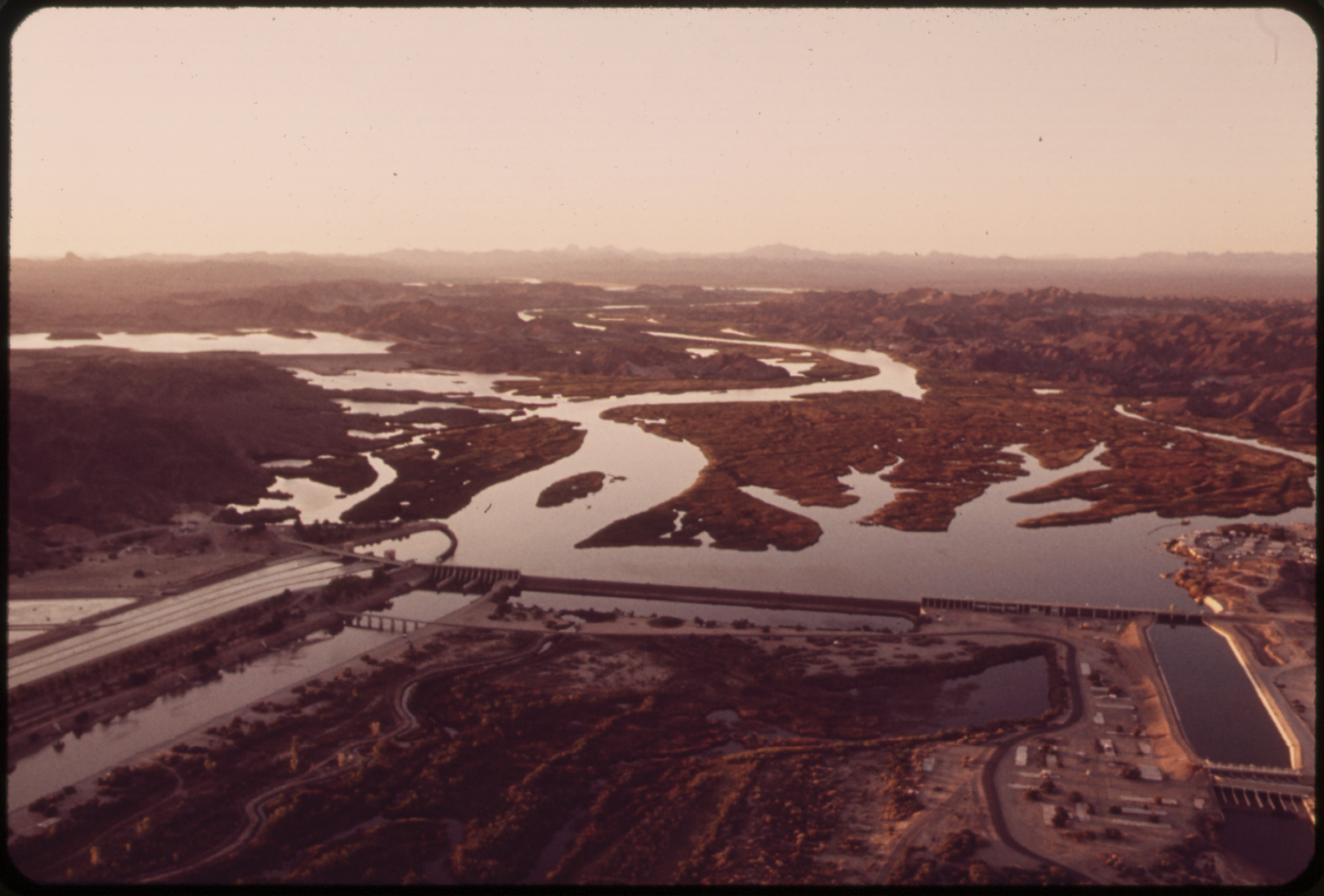
- Imperial Diversion Dam and Reservoir complex in 1972

- Location within California Location within the United States
- Location: Lower Colorado River Valley; Imperial County, California; Yuma County, Arizona
- Coordinates: 32.8833°N 114.4677°W
- Lake type: Reservoir
- Primary inflows: Colorado River
- Primary outflows: Colorado River
- Catchment area: 5,756 acres (2,329 ha)
- Basin countries: United States
- Managing agency: United States Bureau of Reclamation
- Surface area: 28 km^{2} (11 sq mi)
- Water volume: 160,000 acre⋅ft (200,000,000 m^{3})
- Surface elevation: 56 m (184 ft)
- References: U.S. Geological Survey Geographic Names Information System: Imperial Reservoir

The Imperial Reservoir is an artificial lake formed by the construction of the Imperial Diversion Dam across the Colorado River in the Lower Colorado River Valley of Imperial County, California, and Yuma County, Arizona. It is 16 miles (26 km) northeast of Yuma, Arizona.

== Dry wash watersheds ==
Dry washes are the major watershed feed systems to Imperial Reservoir. The next upstream major watershed feeder is the Bill Williams River from western Arizona. Upstream on the Colorado River, the basic feeder watershed to Imperial Reservoir is the Havasu-Mojave Lakes Watershed of Lake Havasu.

The Senator Wash flows eastward from California into the reservoir. The Wash is blocked by Senator Wash Dam to form the Senator Wash Reservoir, which provides more storage for the canals.

== Recreation ==
The Bureau of Land Management operates the T.K. Jones Campground at Xanyō Xamshré (a backwater of the Colorado River north of Imperial Dam). It also operates a long-term campsite below the dam.

Hidden Shores, a BLM concessionaire, is located on the east shore of the Imperial Reservoir.

== See also ==
- List of dams and reservoirs in California
- List of lakes of the Colorado Desert
- List of lakes in California
