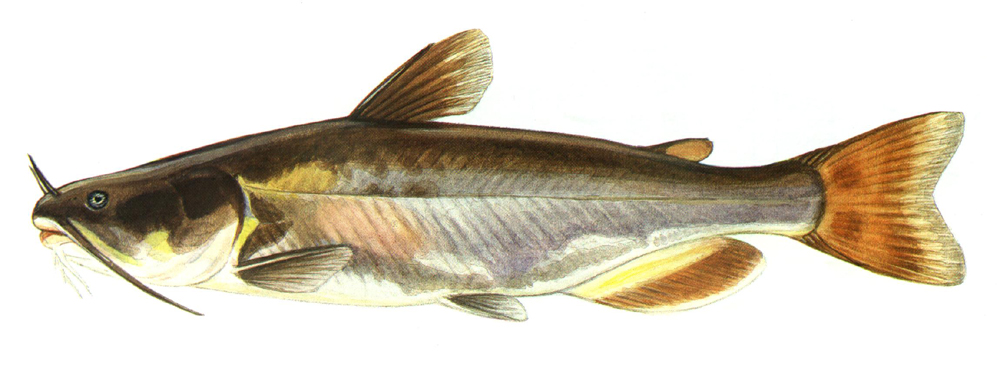

Conservation status
- Least Concern (IUCN 3.1)

Scientific classification
- Kingdom: Animalia
- Phylum: Chordata
- Class: Actinopterygii
- Order: Siluriformes
- Family: Ictaluridae
- Genus: Ameiurus
- Species: A. catus

Binomial name
- Ameiurus catus (Linnaeus, 1758)

Synonyms
- Silurus catus Linnaeus, 1758; Ictalurus catus (Linnaeus, 1758); Pimelodus catus (Linnaeus, 1758); Pimelodus albidus Lesueur, 1819; Ichthaelurus kevinskii Stauffer, 1869; Amiurus lophius Cope, 1870; Pimelodus lynx Girard, 1859; Ichthyaelurus mccaskei Stauffer, 1869; Amiurus niveiventris Cope, 1870

= White bullhead =

Species of fish

The white bullhead (Ameiurus catus), also known as the white catfish, is a member of the family Ictaluridae of the order Siluriformes.

== Distribution ==
The white bullhead is native to river systems of the Eastern United States from the Hudson River in New York to the Peace River in Florida and west to the Apalachicola River, Florida. White bullheads may have migrated naturally into Connecticut rivers as a result of the white bullhead's salt tolerance. Elsewhere, the white bullhead has been widely introduced as a food and game fish, notably into California waters as a result of intentional stocking near Stockton in 1874. It has additionally become established in the Columbia River basin and in Puerto Rico as an introduced species. It was reportedly introduced to the Philippines but did not become established there. Escapees from fee-fishing ponds and stocked lakes have led to the establishment of white bullhead in Missouri.

== Description ==
Ameiurus catus has a head with eight barbels, two nasal, two maxillary and four chin. It is scaleless. It has a spine on the anterior edge of its dorsal and pectoral fins. It usually has six dorsal soft rays. It does not have palatine teeth. It typically weighs between 0.5 and 2.0 pounds (0.23 and 0.91 kg), however, it can attain weights upwards of 10 pounds (4.5 kg).

Like the yellow bullhead (Ameiurus natalis), white catfish have light-colored chin barbels. In A. catus the tail is forked, while it is rounded or truncate in A. natalis. In comparison to channel catfish (Ictalurus punctatus), A. catus typically has a larger head relative to its body width at maturity and a shorter anal fin relative to its body length bearing 22 to 24 rays.

== Habitat ==
Ameiurus catus prefers sluggish, mud-bottom pools and backwaters of rivers and streams, and does well in lakes and large impoundments.

== Behavior ==
=== Feeding ===
White catfish feed mostly on the bottom, where they eat other fish and aquatic insects. They feed most actively at dusk and through the night mostly on bottom-dwelling insects, worms, amphipods, and other small invertebrates.

=== Reproduction ===
Reproduction occurs from April to July when the water temperature ranges between 65 and 75 °F (18 and 24 °C). A gelatinous mass of eggs is deposited in a cavity created by hollow logs or undercut banks. The male guards the nest and incubates the eggs by continually fanning fresh water over them.

== Ecology ==
Predation by introduced white bullheads contributed to the extirpation of Sacramento perch (Archoplites interruptus) from Thurston Lake by 1970. The white bullhead commercial fishery in California was closed in 1953 due to concern of overfishing, and it is not currently considered to be an invasive species by the state.

== See also ==
- Bullhead catfish (general)
