= Naraghi =

Naraghi may refer to:

== People ==
- Vafa Naraghi, South African comedian
- Sama Naraghi (born 1998), Vafa Naraghi’s brother
- Safa Naraghi (born 1992), Vafa Naraghi’s other brother
- Akhtar Naraghi, Canadian poet and novelist
- Ehsan Naraghi (1926–2012), Iranian sociologist
- Mohsen Naraghi (born 1962), Iranian phenomenal nasal surgeon
- Hassan Naraghi (1944–2020), Iranian-Canadian author
- Hadi Naraghi, Iranian football player
- Laila Naraghi (born 1982), Swedish politician of Persian descent and a member of the Swedish Parliament
- Noora Naraghi (born 1988), Iranian motocross rider
- Sanam Naraghi-Anderlini (born 1967), Iranian consultant

== Location ==
- Naraghi Lake, a man-made lake in Modesto, California, USA
