= Emerson Lake =

Lake in the state of California, United States

- Location within California Location within the United States
- Location: Mojave Desert; San Bernardino County, California
- Coordinates: 34.4491°N 116.3959°W
- Lake type: Endorheic basin
- Primary outflows: Terminal (evaporation)
- Basin countries: United States
- Max. length: 6 km (3.7 mi)
- Max. width: 4.5 km (2.8 mi)
- Shore length^{1}: 20 km (12 mi)
- Surface elevation: 698 m (2,290 ft)
- References: U.S. Geological Survey Geographic Names Information System: Emerson Lake
- ^{1} Shore length is not a well-defined measure.

Emerson Lake is a dry lake bed in the Mojave Desert of San Bernardino County, California, 66 km (41 mi) northeast of Joshua Tree. The lake is approximately 6 km (3.7 mi) long and 4.5 km (2.8 mi) at its widest point.

Emerson Lake is on federal lands within the borders of the Marine Corps Air Ground Combat Center Twentynine Palms, west of Hildago Mountain.

== See also ==
- List of lakes in California
