= Beyers Lakes =

Lake in the state of California, United States

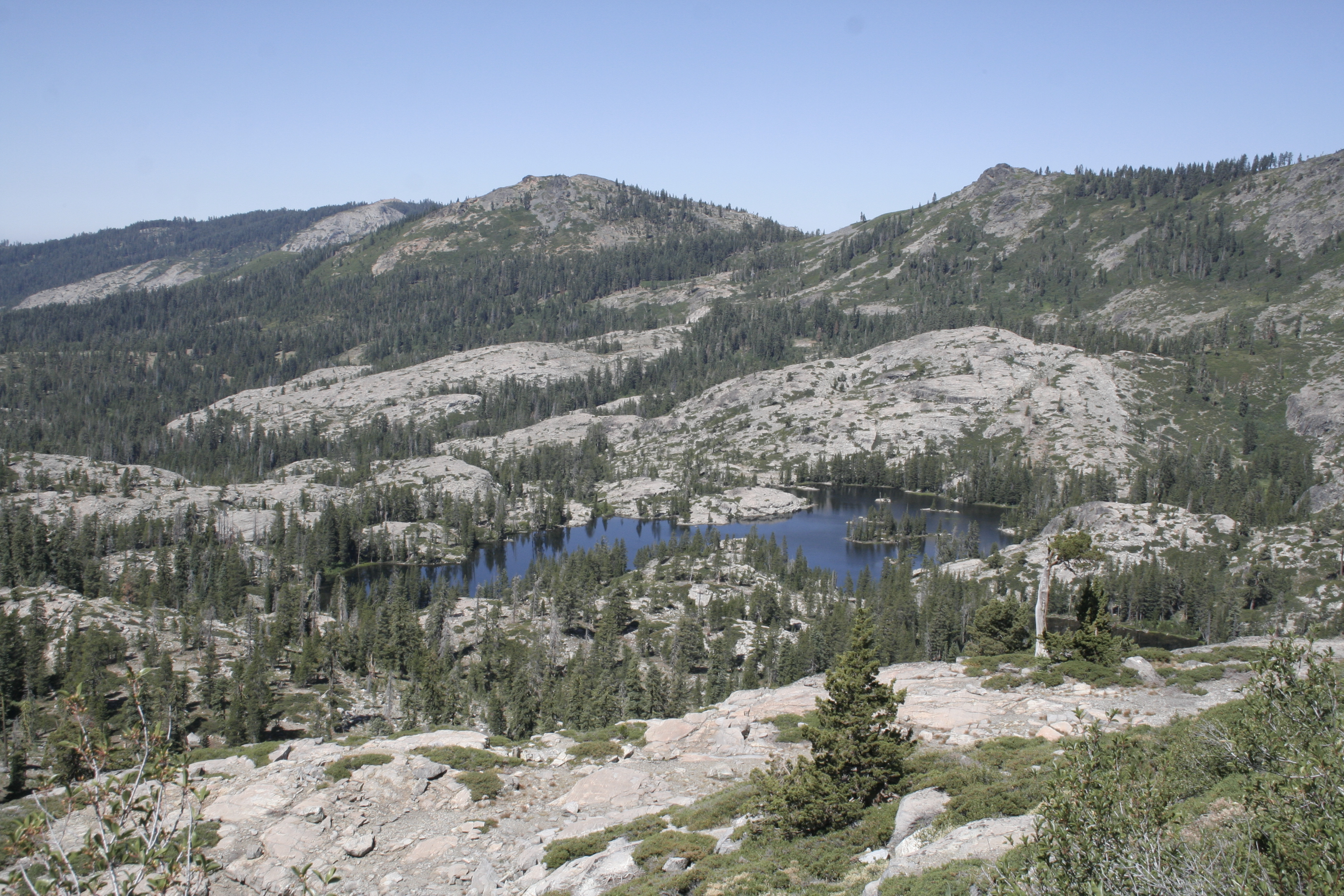

- Location within California Location within the United States
- Location: Nevada County, California
- Coordinates: 39°23′06″N 120°33′18″W
- Basin countries: United States
- Surface elevation: 6,860 feet (2,090 m)

The Beyers Lakes are located in the Tahoe National Forest, in California.

They can be accessed via the Beyers Lakes Trail from Grouse Ridge Trail. Grouse Ridge trail can be accessed from the Eagle Lakes trailhead, off of Interstate 80, or from Grouse Ridge Campground.

They sit below the Black Buttes of Grouse Ridge, and are part of the Fordyce Creek watershed draining into Lake Spaulding.

== See also ==
- List of lakes in California
