= Moore Creek (California) =

Creek in Santa Cruz, California

Coordinates: 36°57′01″N 122°03′30″W

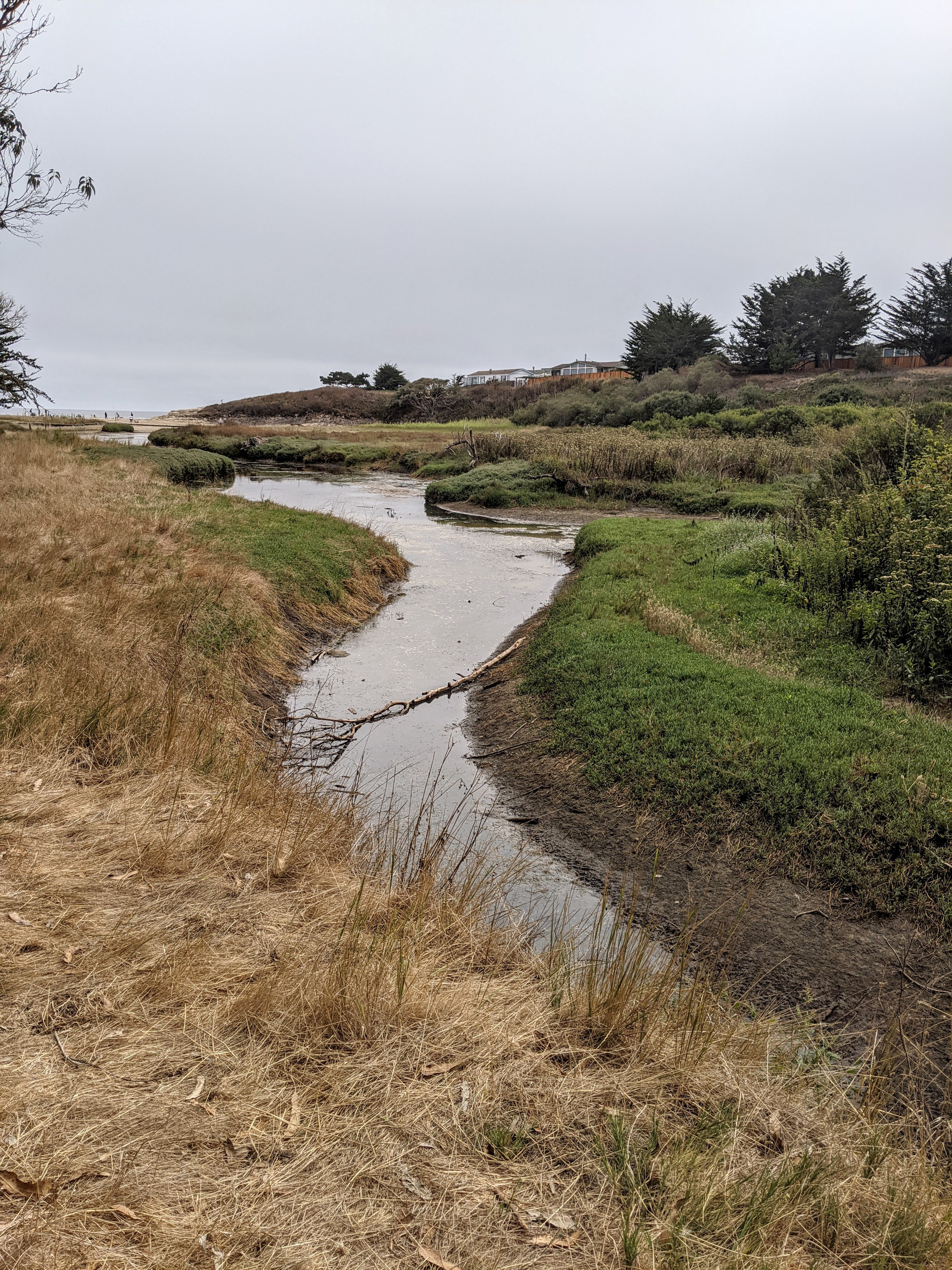
Moore Creek at Natural Bridges State Beach

Moore Creek is a short ephemeral stream in Santa Cruz, California, that drains the lower UCSC campus and empties into the Pacific. On its course from the Moore Creek Preserve, it runs through Antonelli Pond by the UCSC Administration Building, then through a tidal wetland to the ocean at Natural Bridges State Beach.

Moore Creek flows through the 246-acre Moore Creek Wildlife Preserve, jointly managed by the City of Santa Cruz and the Land Trust of Santa Cruz County. The reserve's territory includes diverse ecosystems such as coastal prairie, oak woodland and coastal shrubland, which contribute to rich biodiversity and make it an attractive place for wildlife viewing.

For those who enjoy hiking, the preserve has a trail called Moore Creek Trail, which is about 1.4 km (0.9 mi) long and leads to a viewing platform. This trail is considered moderately difficult and is suitable for bird watching, running, and walking. It is open year-round, but dogs are not allowed on the trail.

After leaving the preserve, Moore Creek flows through Antonelli Pond, a man-made pond popular with fishermen and bird watchers. The creek then crosses tidal wetlands before emptying into the Pacific Ocean at Natural Bridges State Beach. This beach is known for its picturesque natural arches and is home to the annual migration of monarch butterflies.
