= Loch Leven (California) =

Lake in the state of California, United States

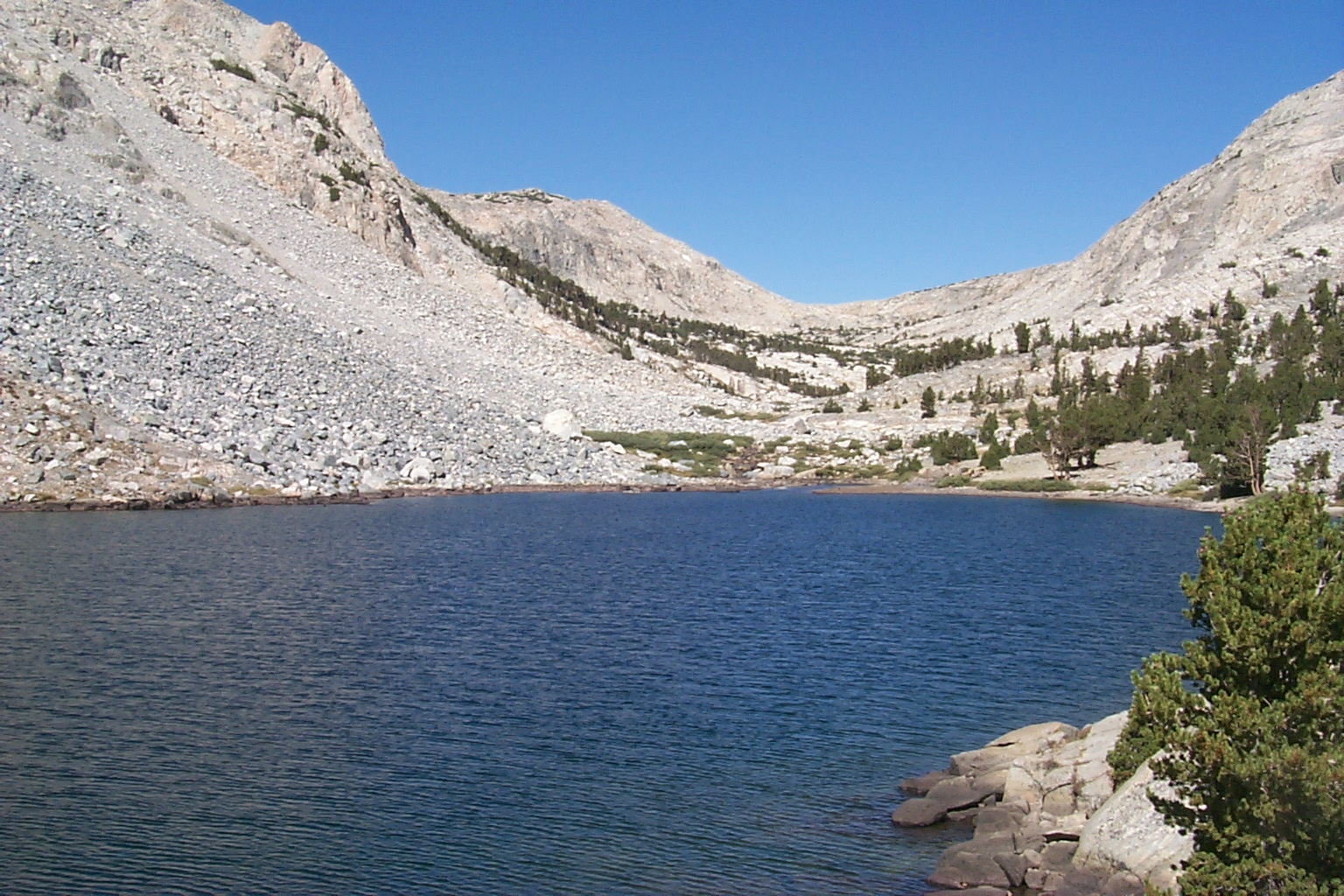
- Loch Leven, looking west towards Piute Pass

- Location within California Location within the United States
- Location: Inyo County, California
- Coordinates: 37°13′52″N 118°39′16″W
- Primary inflows: North Fork of Bishop Creek
- Primary outflows: North Fork of Bishop Creek
- Basin countries: United States
- Surface elevation: 10,748 ft (3,276 m)

Loch Leven is the name of several lakes in California, United States, in the Sierra Nevada.

== Inyo County ==
Loch Leven in Inyo County, California, was named after Loch Leven in Scotland. The USGS lists Loch Leven at 37°13′52″N 118°39′16″W on the "Mount Darwin" topographic map.

== Placer County ==
The Loch Leven Lakes are located in Placer County, California. Three larger lakes and several smaller ones are centered at 39°17′10″N 120°30′15″W and can be found on the "Cisco Grove" and "Soda Springs" USGS topographic maps.

The Loch Leven Lakes are a popular day hike, with the U.S. Forest Service rating the trail's use level as "heavy" and its difficulty as "moderate". The Loch Leven trailhead is near the Big Bend Visitor Center (just off Interstate 80), and the trail climbs 1,070 feet (330 m) in 2.5 miles (4.0 km) to reach the first lake, with Upper Loch Leven (also known as High Loch Leven) another 1.1 miles (1.8 km) beyond.

== See also ==
- List of lakes in California
