= Nelson Lake (San Bernardino County) =

Dry lake in the state of California, United States

- Location within California Location within the United States
- Location: Mojave Desert; San Bernardino County, California
- Coordinates: 35.4308°N 116.7755°W
- Lake type: Endorheic basin
- Primary outflows: Terminal
- Basin countries: United States
- Max. length: 3 km (1.9 mi)
- Max. width: 2 km (1.2 mi)
- Shore length^{1}: 30 km (19 mi)
- Surface elevation: 937 m (3,074 ft)
- References: U.S. Geological Survey Geographic Names Information System: Nelson Lake
- ^{1} Shore length is not a well-defined measure.

Nelson Lake is a dry lake in the Mojave Desert of San Bernardino County, California, 67 km (42 mi) northeast of Barstow. The lake is approximately 3 km (1.9 mi) by 2 km (1.2 mi) at its widest point.

Nelson Lake is on federal lands within the borders of the Fort Irwin Military Reservation, southwest of the Granite Mountains.

== See also ==
- List of lakes in California
