= Statue Lake =

Lake in the state of California, United States

- Location within California
- Location: Russian Wilderness, Klamath National Forest, Siskiyou County, California
- Coordinates: 41°18′35″N 122°58′24″W
- Type: lake
- Surface elevation: 2,191 m (7,188 ft)

Statue Lake is a lake located in the Russian Wilderness, which itself is located in the Klamath National Forest in California. The back wall of the lake is framed with statues, from which the lake received its name.

== See also ==
- List of lakes in California
