= Ukonom Lake =

- Location within California Location within the United States
- Location: Marble Mountain Wilderness; Klamath National Forest; Siskiyou County, California
- Coordinates: 41°34′49″N 123°21′24″W
- Type: Reservoir
- Primary outflows: Ukonom Creek
- Surface area: 67 acres (27 ha)
- Max. depth: 68 ft (21 m)
- Surface elevation: 1,847 m (6,060 ft)

Ukonom Lake is a reservoir in western Siskiyou County, California, located in the Marble Mountain Wilderness at an elevation of 6,060 feet (1,847 m). Covering 67 acres (27 ha), it is the largest body of water in the Marble Mountain Wilderness when measured by surface area; however, being relatively shallow, it is not the largest by volume.

== History ==
A 10-foot (3.0 m) dam was built from granite in the 1800s to divert water for hydraulic mining operations at the Bunker Hill Mine near the Klamath River, 7 miles (11 km) to the northwest. Today, the reservoir is popular among visitors to the Marble Mountain Wilderness, and the U.S. Forest Service stocks the reservoir with rainbow trout. The wilderness surrounding Ukonom Lake was impacted by the Panther Fire in the summer of 2008.

== See also ==
- List of lakes in California
