= Lake Clementine =

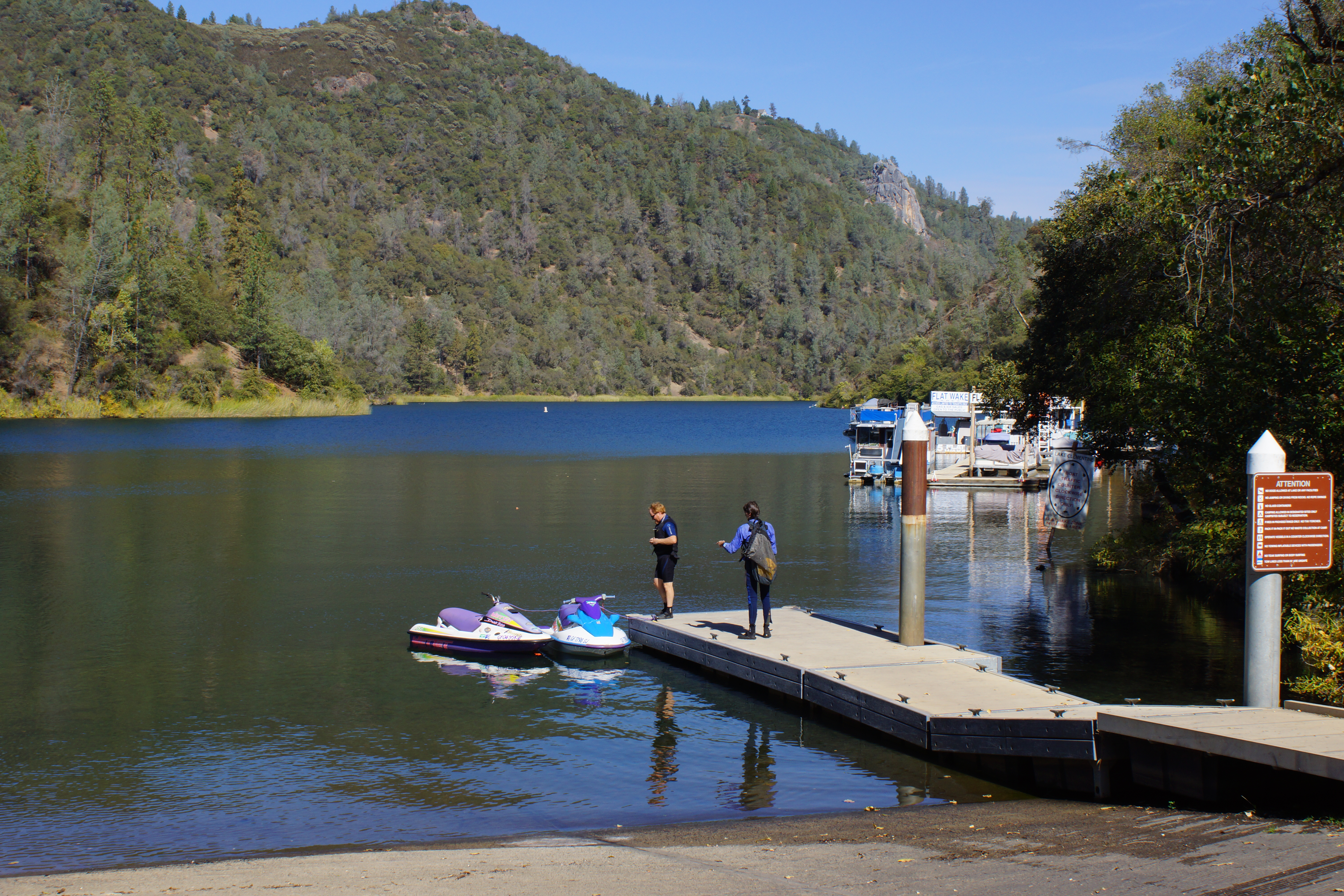

- Location within California
- Location: California, United States
- Coordinates: 38°56′38.7″N 121°00′08.5″W
- Type: Reservoir
- Built: 1939; 87 years ago
- Max. length: 3.5 miles (5.6 km)
- Max. width: 300 ft (91 m)

Lake Clementine (also known as North Fork Lake) is a reservoir on the North Fork American River Canyon above the picturesque, California Gold Rush-era town of Auburn (elevation 1,200 feet (370 m)) in Northern California. It was created in 1939 when the North Fork Dam, a 155-foot (47 m) tall constant angle arch dam, was completed by the United States Army Corps of Engineers, for the purpose of containing gold-mining debris which were washing downriver. This resulting reservoir is a long and narrow lake approximately 3.5 miles long and 300 feet wide in some areas. The lake and surrounding area is owned by the United States Bureau of Reclamation and managed by California Department of Parks and Recreation.

== Recreation ==
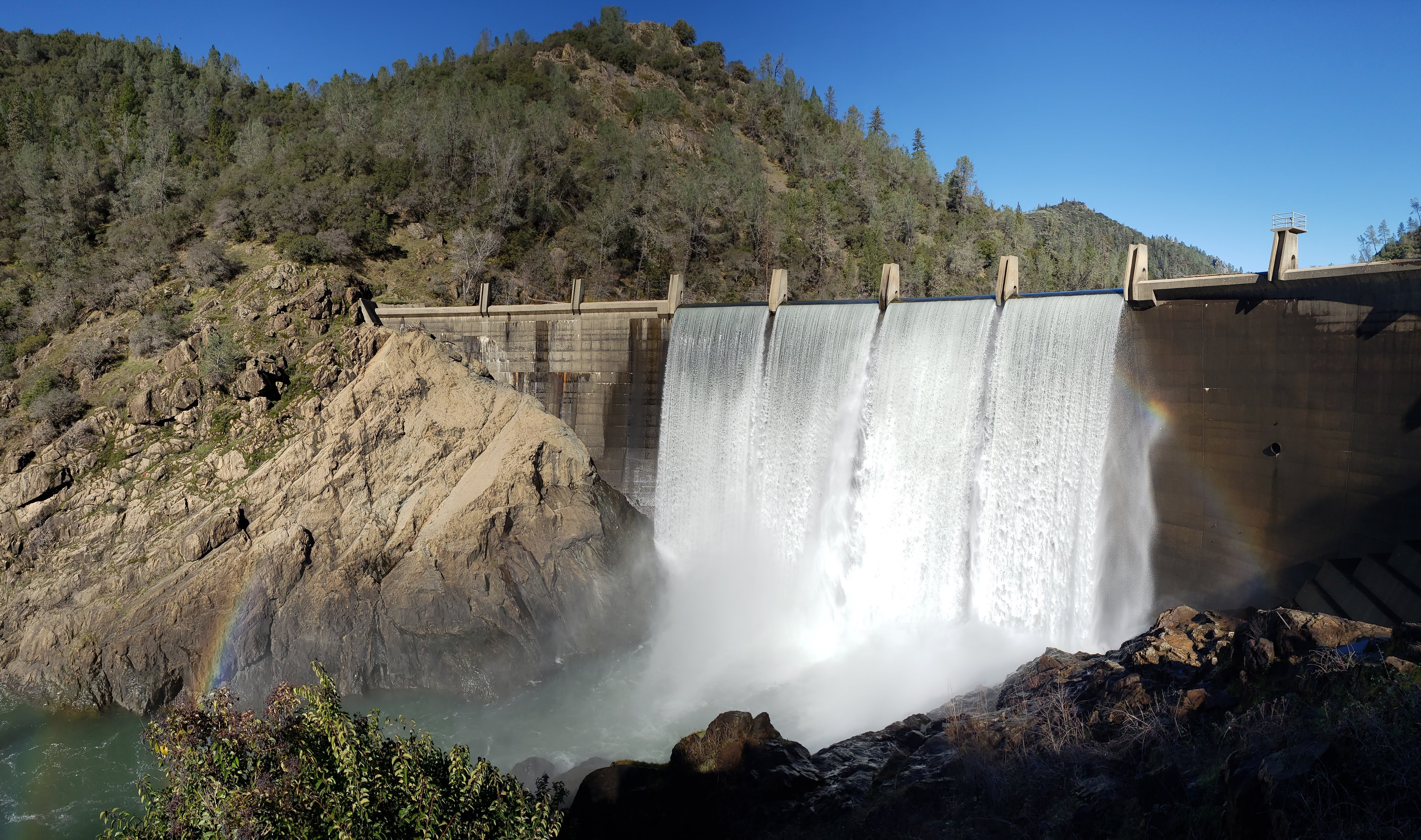
Photo of Lake Clementine Dam

The reservoir is open to boat traffic, a water-skiing and wakeboarding spot during the summer. However, it is possible to quietly enjoy the lake for kayaking, rowing, and fishing. It features steep forested canyon walls and contains several large high quality limestone deposits, one large vertical outcropping of which is known as Robbers Roost, and offers climbing and caving opportunities for the adventurous. A popular hiking, running, and mountain biking trail courses from the dam area, continues downstream below the 730 ft (220 m) in height Foresthill Bridge, linking Lake Clementine to the North and Middle Forks American River Confluence area below the dam. The trail also connects to a large network of hiking, running, and mountain biking trail systems stretching eastward into the Sierra Nevada mountain range, near Lake Tahoe. Because the dam is designed so that the river flows over its top, a waterfall is created that grows impressively large in winter and spring when rain and snow melt cause high river flows.

Upper Lake Clementine is accessed by car via separate entrance from Lower Lake Clementine or by non-motorized vehicles. Upper Lake Clementine is seasonally opened from May 1 through October 15 from sunrise to thirty minutes before sunset. Accessible down a 1.5 mile switchback unpaved dirt road, there is an expansive day use beach. The day use area consists of large pebble rocky beach along the south side of the lake. Dogs are not allowed. Recreational activities may include canoeing, kayaking, paddle boarding, or gold panning using the hand and pan method. The lower portion of the lake is limited to boat access only and includes a boat in campsite.

== Lime Rock ==
From the lake and some surrounding trails, a prominent geographic feature called "Lime Rock" can be seen. This is a large limestone outcropping which is known locally as "Robber's Roost". During the gold rush days this rock served as a look out point for stage robbers. The bandits had the vantage to determine if the stagecoach had armed guards to protect it and if the stagecoach was vulnerable they would signal an attack. Some historians claim that Black Bart, a notorious stagecoach bandit during the California Gold Rush, lead this gang of Robbers Roost bandits.

== Flora and Fauna ==
Along the shores and surrounding areas the vegetation includes several tree species including various oaks, manzanita (Arctostaphylos manzanita), madrone(Arbutus menziesii), and ponderosa pine (Pinus ponderosa). Wildflowers such as California Poppy (Eschscholzia californica), a few variety of Lupin (Lupinus), and winter vetch (Vicia villosa) can also be seen throughout the spring season. There is also a proliferate presence of blackberry (Rubus armeniacus and Rubus ursinus) and poison oak.

Commonly sighted animal species include:

- mule deer (Odocoileus hemionus)
- turkey (Meleagris gallopavo)
- black bear (Ursus americanus)
- skunk (Mephitis)
- squirrels (Sciurus)
- mountain lions (Puma concolor)

Many fish species have been identified in Lake Clementine including:

- trout (Oncorhynchus mykiss)
- brown trout (Salmo trutta)
- largemouth bass (Micropterus salmoides)
- smallmouth bass (Micropterus dolomieu)
- bluegill (Lepomis macrochirus)
- channel catfish (Ictalurus punctatus)
- green sunfish (Lepomis cyanellus)
- Redear sunfish (Lepomis microlophus)
- Sacramento pikeminnow (Ptychocheilus grandis)
- common carp (Cyprinus carpio)

== North Fork Dam ==
The North Fork Dam (CA10110) is a variable angle arch dam. There are three types of arch dams: constant radius, variable radius, and constant angle arch dams. Variable angle arch dams are dams which have varying curvature along their horizontal profile. The dam rises 155 feet above the lowest foundation and has a crest elevation of 715 feet above sea level. The crest length is 620 feet and the crown thickness varies from 22 feet at the base to 6.8 feet at the top. Lake Clementine was created when the construction of the dam was completed. The reservoir has a capacity of 14,700 acre-feet, and a surface area of 280 acres. The reservoir is approximately 3.5 miles long and has very narrow steep canyon walls.

Hydraulic mining in the late 19th century led to many issue downstream, including increased sedimentation from mine tailings and rising flood stage. The North Fork Dam was engineered to decrease the amount of sedimentation flowing downstream and as a result flood stages of downstream channels have decreased an average of 4.3 cm/year.

As a result of mining practices, the American River watershed is classified under the Clean Water Act as 303d listed for mercury contamination based on the findings of mercury in fish tissue below the North Fork Dam. Mercury binds to gold and made it easier to extract gold from the sediment washed down from hydraulic mining.

== See also ==
- List of dams and reservoirs in California
- List of lakes in California
