= List of lakes of the Colorado Desert =

There are a few named lakes, reservoirs, and dry lakes in the Colorado Desert in the U.S. state of California.

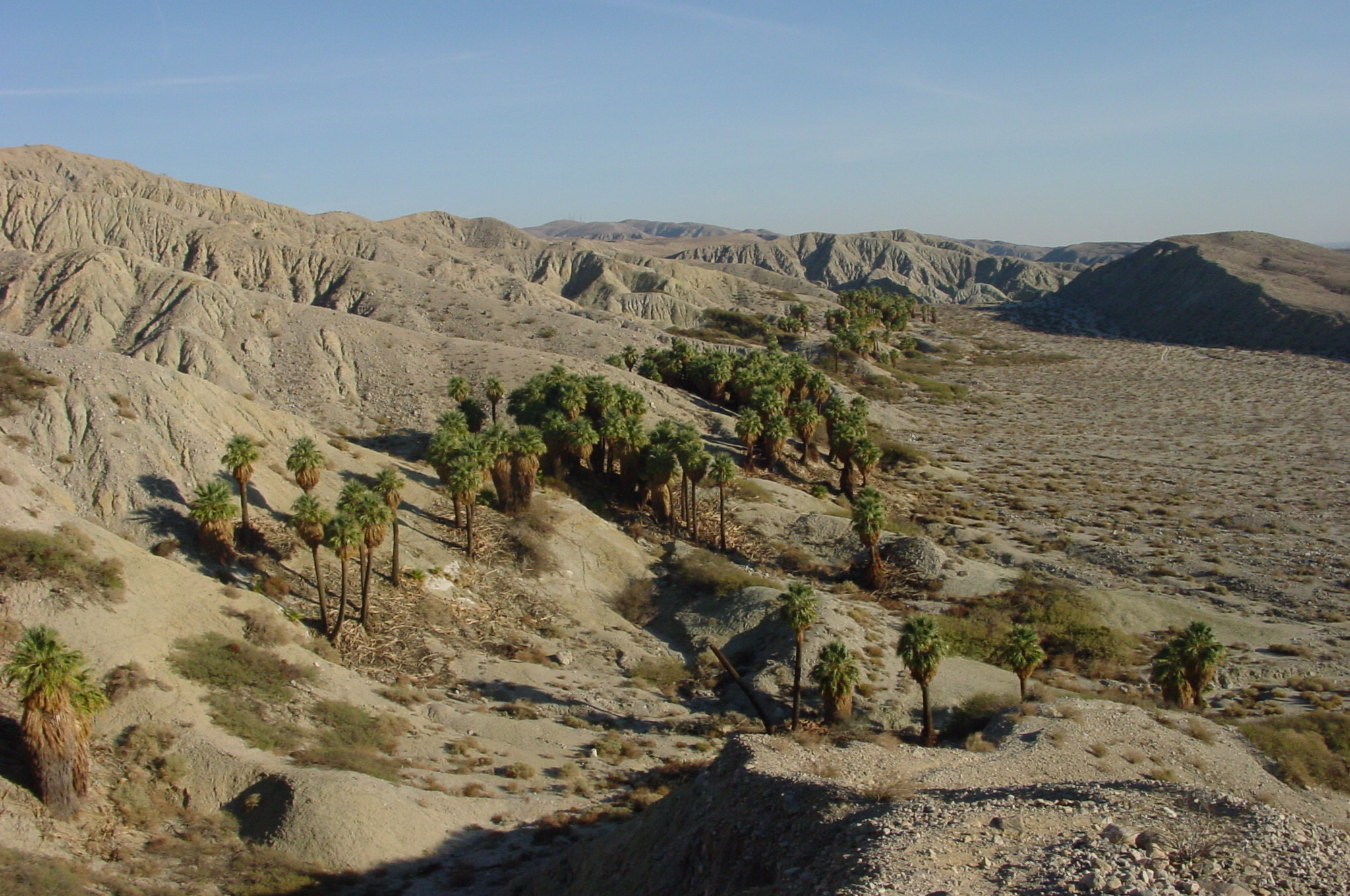
Coachella Valley Preserve in the Colorado Desert

== Largest Lake ==
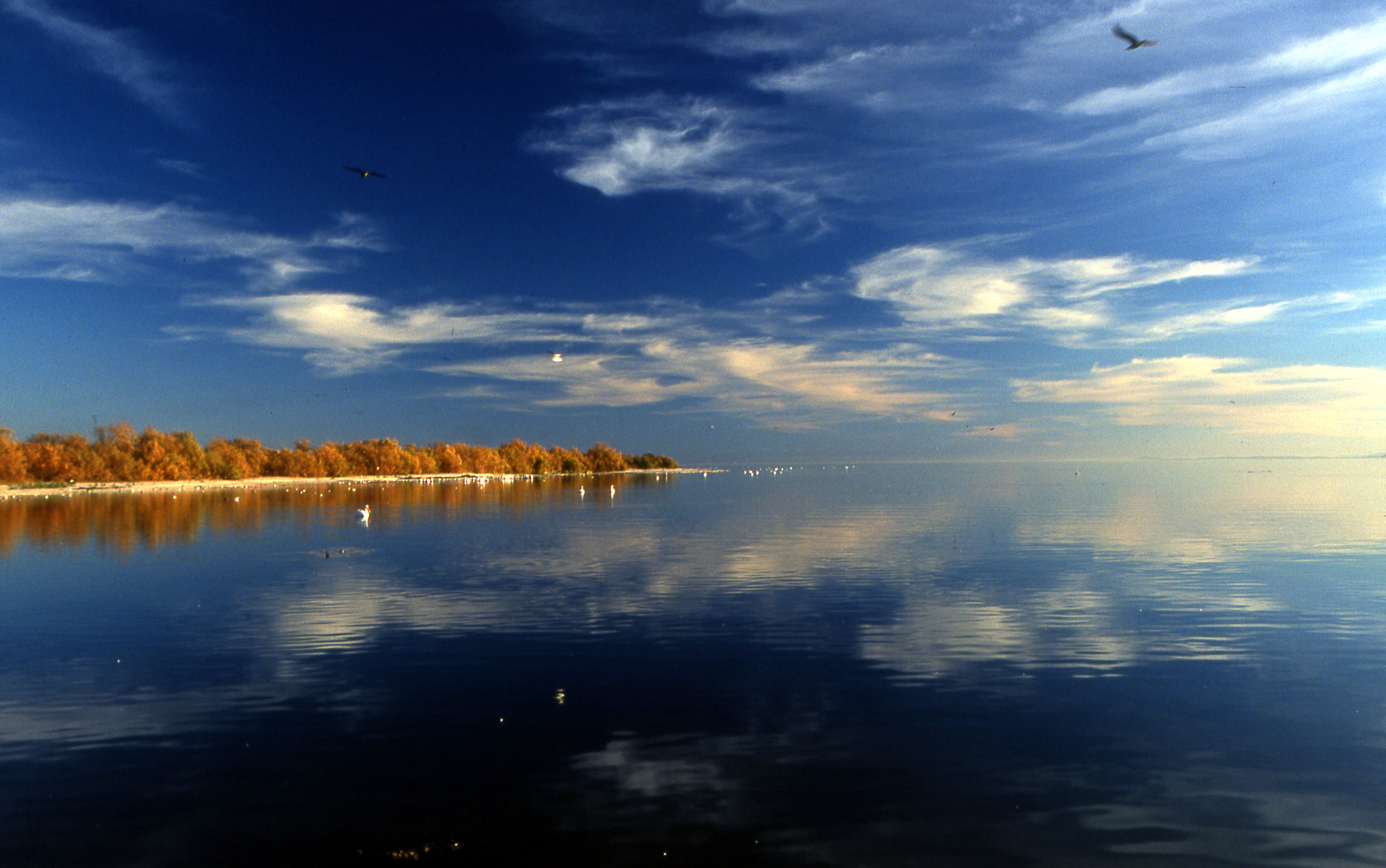
Salton Sea is the Largest lake in the Colorado Desert and In the U.S. State of California

In the Colorado Desert, The Salton Sea is the largest lake in the Desert. The Salton Sea is also the largest lake in the U.S. state of California. The lake formed in 1905 which is now saline. It occupies 376 square miles (970 km^{2}) in the southeast corner of the state, but because it is shallow it only holds about 7.5 million acre⋅ft (2.4 trillion US gal; 9.3 trillion L) of water.

== List of Lakes ==
The list is alphabetized by the name of the lake, with the words lake, of, and the ignored. To sort on a different column, click on the arrows in the header row.

Geographic coordinates, approximate elevations, alternative names, and other details may be obtained by following the Geographic Names Information System links in the third column.

Note: Lakes grow and shrink due to precipitation, evaporation, releases, and diversions. For this reason, many of the surface areas tabulated below are very approximate. For reservoirs, the areas at maximum water storage are indicated. Reservoirs used for flood control are seldom allowed to reach maximum storage. Swimming, fishing, and/or boating are permitted in some of these lakes, but not all.

- Brock Reservoir
- Lake Cahuilla (reservoir) (1849391)
- Ferguson Lake, California (242200)
- Imperial Reservoir (243787)
- Salton Sea (248771)
- Senator Wash Reservoir (1664675)

== See also ==
- List of lakes of the United States
- List of lakes of California
- Colorado Desert
