= Deep Lake (Ross Island) =

- Location within Antarctica
- Location: Antarctica
- Coordinates: 77°34′S 166°13′E
- Type: lake
- Max. length: 450 meters (1,480 ft)
- Max. width: 105 meters (344 ft)
- Surface elevation: 12 meters (39 ft)

Deep Lake (77°34′S 166°13′E) is a small elongate lake 0.5 nautical miles (0.9 km) north of Cape Barne, Ross Island. The descriptive name was applied by the British Antarctic Expedition, 1907–09.

== Description ==
The geology of the lake was first described in 1914. The lake basin was formed by a kenyte lava flow.

The lake is perennially frozen, with the icesheet approximately 5 meters thick at the center of the lake. The depth of the water under the ice fluctuates with seasonal melt. One auger measurement placed the depth of the lake at 10.6 meters.
