= Mud Lake (California) =

There are over 30 lakes named Mud Lake within the U.S. state of California.

Lake and locality	Coordinates
Mud Lake, Alpine County, California	38°25′33″N 119°58′02″W
Mud Lake, Amador County, California	38°36′35″N 120°08′57″W
Horseshoe Lake, also known as Mud Lake, Butte County, California	39°46′21″N 121°46′59″W
Mud Lake, Calaveras County, California	38°26′13″N 120°01′13″W
Mud Lake, Del Norte County, California	41°54′34″N 123°33′51″W
Mud Lake, El Dorado County, California	39°01′09″N 120°16′17″W
Mud Lake, Humboldt County, California	40°47′49″N 123°41′22″W
Mud Lake, Lassen County, California	40°30′46″N 120°59′33″W
Mud Lake, Marin County, California	37°58′23″N 122°45′28″W
Mud Lake, Mendocino County, California	39°16′31″N 123°22′10″W
Mud Lake, Modoc County, California	41°29′35″N 121°10′38″W
Mud Lake, Modoc County, California	41°39′41″N 120°02′54″W
Mud Lake, Modoc County, California	41°49′30″N 120°35′39″W
Mud Lake, Modoc County, California	41°52′59″N 121°15′01″W
Mud Lake, Mono County, California	38°20′16″N 119°31′25″W
Mud Lake, Nevada County, California	39°28′41″N 120°35′16″W
Mud Lake, Placer County, California	39°03′05″N 120°15′28″W
Mud Lake, Plumas County, California	39°41′51″N 120°41′17″W
Mud Lake, Plumas County, California	39°56′12″N 121°12′33″W
Blue Lake, also known as Mud Lake, Plumas County, California	39°56′14″N 121°12′56″W
Mud Lake, Plumas County, California	39°56′43″N 121°08′36″W
Mud Lake, Plumas County, California	39°59′47″N 121°20′08″W
Mud Lake, Plumas County, California	40°10′35″N 120°42′54″W
Mud Lake, Plumas County, California	40°14′04″N 121°14′59″W
Mud Lake, San Luis Obispo County, California	35°03′45″N 120°36′43″W
Mud Lake, Santa Clara County, California	37°08′23″N 121°34′31″W
Mud Lake, Shasta County, California	40°37′40″N 121°33′47″W
Mud Lake, Shasta County, California	40°42′10″N 121°23′56″W
Mud Lake, Sierra County, California	39°37′23″N 120°38′35″W
Mud Lake, Siskiyou County, California	41°16′32″N 123°11′57″W
Mud Lake, Siskiyou County, California	41°45′07″N 122°04′08″W
Mud Lake, Siskiyou County, California	41°59′10″N 121°59′02″W
Mud Lake, Trinity County, California	40°06′06″N 123°07′25″W
Mud Lake, Tuolumne County, California	38°09′05″N 119°54′18″W

== See also ==
- List of lakes in California
