= Rosamond Lake =

Dry lake in the Mojave Desert, California, U.S.

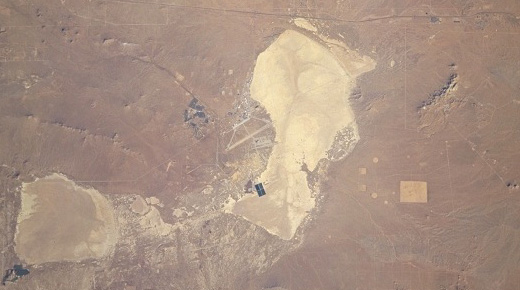
- Rosamond (lower left) and Rogers dry lakebeds in Mojave Desert, California

- Location within California Location within the United States
- Location: Mojave Desert; Kern County, California; Los Angeles County, California
- Coordinates: 34°49′56″N 118°03′56″W
- Lake type: Endorheic basin
- Basin countries: United States
- Max. length: 5.0 mi (8 km)
- Max. width: 5.6 mi (9 km)
- Surface area: 14 sq mi (35 km^{2})
- Shore length^{1}: 19 mi (30 km)
- Surface elevation: 2,277 ft (694 m)
- Settlements: Edwards Air Force Base
- References: U.S. Geological Survey Geographic Names Information System: Rosamond Lake
- ^{1} Shore length is not a well-defined measure.

Rosamond Lake is a natural dry lake bed in the Mojave Desert of Kern and Los Angeles County, California. The shores of the lake are entirely within the borders of Edwards Air Force Base, approximately 10 miles (16 km) from Lancaster. The lake is adjacent to Rogers Dry Lake which through the Holocene, together made up one large water-body. Piute Ponds are immediately to the southwest.

== See also ==
- List of lakes in California
