= Stanford Lake =

Lake in the state of California, United States

- Location within California Location within the United States
- Location: Crowley Lake Watershed
- Coordinates: 37°29′32″N 118°47′03″W
- Basin countries: United States
- Surface elevation: 11,443 ft (3,488 m)
- References: GNIS code 267667

Stanford Lake is a natural mountain lake in the Eastern Sierra Nevada, in California.

It is near Mount Stanford on the Sierra Crest, in the Inyo National Forest.

== See also ==
- List of lakes in California
