= Avonelle Lake =

- Location within California
- Location: Tuolumne County, California
- Coordinates: 38.055°N 119.643°W
- Type: lake

Avonelle Lake is a lake in Tuolumne County, California, in the United States.

Avonelle Lake was named for the daughter of a Yellowstone National Park ranger.

== See also ==
- List of lakes in California
