= Moore Creek (Timiskaming District) =

Location
- Country: Canada
- Province: Ontario
- District: Timiskaming
- Municipality: Temiskaming Shores

Physical characteristics
- Source: Unnamed spot
  - coordinates: 47°27′46″N 79°39′33″W
  - elevation: 228 m (748 ft)
- Mouth: Wabi Bay on Lake Timiskaming
  - coordinates: 47°28′08″N 79°38′52″W
  - elevation: 178.4 m (585 ft)
- Length: 1.25 km (0.78 mi)

Moore Creek is a short creek in the St. Lawrence River drainage basin in Temiskaming Shores, Timiskaming District, Ontario, Canada, between the communities of New Liskeard and Haileybury.

== Hydrology ==
Moore Creek travels from its source 1.25 kilometres (0.78 mi) east to its mouth at Wabi Bay on Lake Timiskaming, at an elevation of 178.4 metres (585.3 ft), which flows via the Ottawa River into the St. Lawrence River. The Ontario Northland Railway mainline and Highway 11B cross the creek just before the mouth.

== See also ==
- List of rivers of Ontario
