= Antonelli Pond =

Artificial lake in Santa Cruz, California

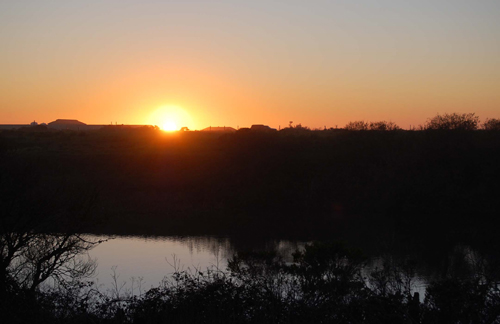
- Sunset (February 2008)

- Location within California Location within the United States
- Location: Santa Cruz, California
- Coordinates: 36°57′17″N 122°03′37″W
- Type: artificial pond
- Basin countries: United States
- Surface area: 6.4 acres (2.6 ha)
- Max. depth: 0.9 m (3.0 ft)
- Water volume: 3 m (9.8 ft)

Antonelli Pond is a century old, man-made pond on the west side of the city of Santa Cruz, California that now has ecological and cultural significance. The pond and surrounding riparian habitat are foraging and/or breeding grounds for many species including raptors, egrets, great blue heron, deer, raccoon, coyote, and several rodent species, including woodrats. Additionally, the pond has many paths for walking and spots for fishing that are enjoyed daily by local community residents.

== Conservation ==
The non-profit organization Land Trust of Santa Cruz County (LTSCC) acquired Antonelli Pond as four parcels between 1982 and 1994. These include the pond, surrounding riparian areas and grasslands, and land that adjoins Moore Creek. The final parcel was obtained in 1994. The total area that LTSCC manages at Antonelli Pond is 13.7 acres (55,000 m^{2}) and 3 metres (9.8 ft), with the pond itself making up approximately 6.4 acres (LTSCC 2004). In 1989, initial improvements were made to the pond and surrounding area. These improvements included graveled walking trails, small fishing platforms, a staircase near the northern bank leading to the water's edge, wooden benches, and informational signs. The LTSCC's goal is to preserve this space as an urban natural area, promote the continued use of the site for wildlife breeding and foraging, and maintain public access.

== Deteriorated conditions ==
Conditions at Antonelli Pond have deteriorated. Invasive plant species have outcompeted many of the native plants and the number of bird, mammal, reptile, and amphibian species has declined. The trails have erosion problems mainly caused by unauthorized vehicle usage. Other damage is caused by trash, such as beer bottles. Also, many of the benches, stairs, and fishing platforms have been vandalized.

Some invasive species have caused severe impacts on the natural community surrounding Antonelli Pond. The most damaging species at this site are Conium maculatum (poison hemlock), Rubus armeniacus (Himalayan blackberry), Hedera helix (English ivy), and Delairea odorata (cape ivy).

== Restoration ==
In the spring of 2007, restoration work began on a portion of the Antonelli Pond site. Efforts included initial removal of several invasive plant species, the installation of gates to prevent vehicle access, trail grading to prevent erosion, and the construction of several wood duck boxes around the pond edge to provide nesting habitat. Native seeds will be collected and propagated from species that currently populate the area. For additional re-vegetation, seeds, cuttings, and plant starts from other native species will be obtained from local nurseries. The first native planting is planned for the fall of 2007. An interim vegetation management plan was written to guide the clean-up, restoration, and conservation efforts that will be ongoing for the next several years.

== See also ==
- List of lakes in California
