= Kenyte =

Type of igneous rock

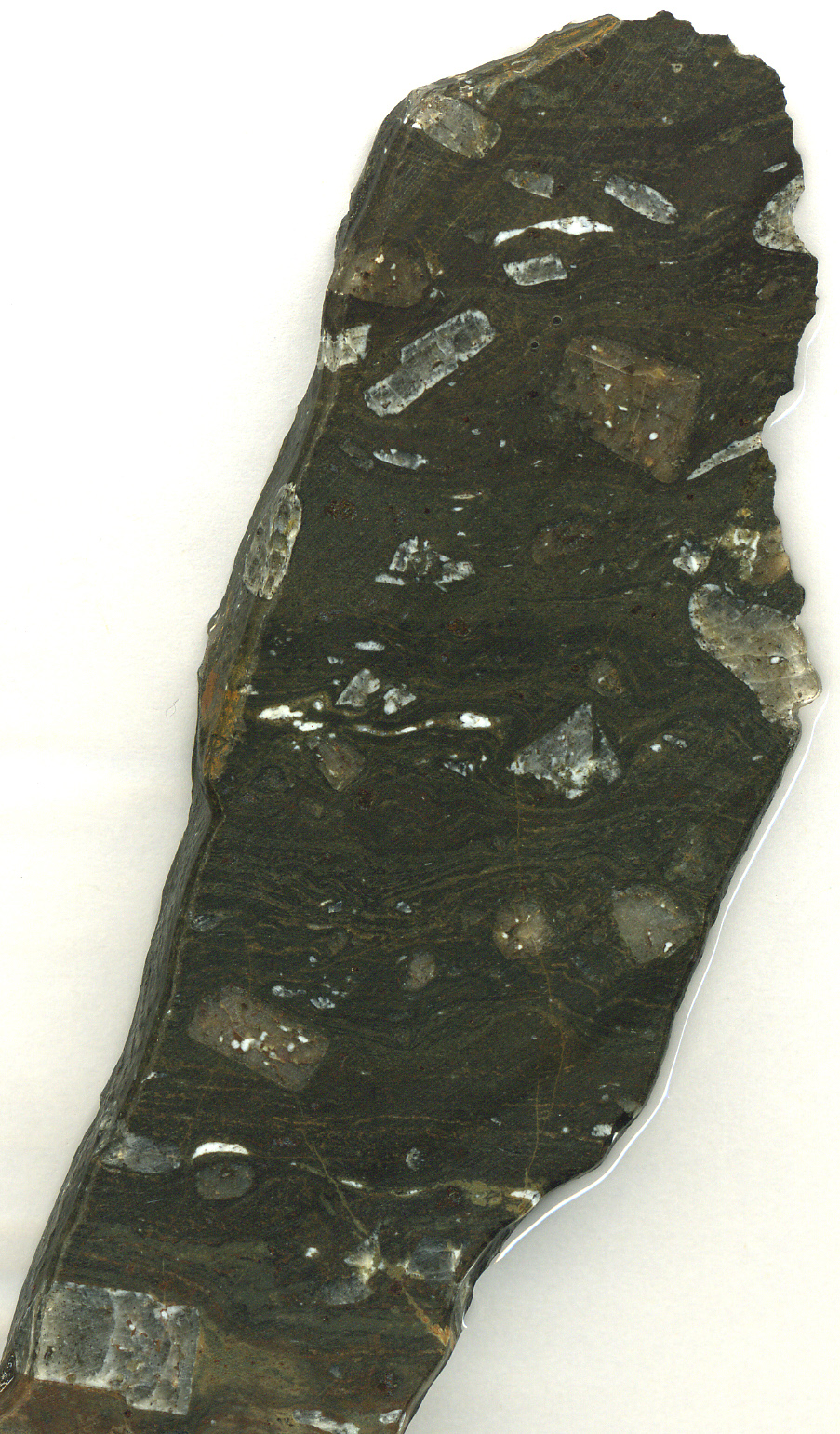
Kenyte from Mount Kenya

Kenyte is a type of igneous rock. More specifically, it is a variety of porphyritic phonolite or trachyte with rhomb-shaped phenocrysts of anorthoclase with variable amounts of olivine and augite in a glassy matrix; the glass may be devitrified.

It was originally described and named by J. W. Gregory in 1900 for the occurrence on Mount Kenya. Kenyte has also been reported from Mount Kilimanjaro (Tanzania) and Mount Erebus (Antarctica).
