= Lake Leavitt (California) =

Reservoir in Lassen County, California

- Location within California Location within the United States
- Location: Lassen County, California
- Coordinates: 40.3663123°N 120.5124407°W
- Type: Reservoir
- Catchment area: 5,200 acres (2,100 ha)
- Basin countries: United States
- Max. length: 9,500 ft (2,900 m)
- Water volume: 1,142 acre⋅ft (1,409,000 m^{3})
- Surface elevation: 4,101 ft (1,250 m)

Lake Leavitt (not to be confused with Leavitt Lake, which is an alpine lake in Mono County) is a reservoir in Lassen County, California, United States. The 1,142 acres (462 hectares) lake was created in 1889 from a natural sinkhole by Benjamin H. Leavitt. It is now part of the Honey Lake Valley irrigation system and managed by the Lassen Irrigation Company. The area is currently being remediated due to damage from cattle ranches, and is home to waterfowl, mule deer, pronghorn antelope, and other local species.

== Construction ==
Lake Leavitt is 1,142 acres (462 hectares) and formed by the Lake Leavitt Dam, completed in 1889 by Benjamin H. Leavitt. Leavitt's son, Victor E. Perry, worked on the dams construction. He tricked the workers of the dam to work harder and by planting a gold nugget at the lake, and when it was discovered, he declared all gold found by a miner was theirs to keep so long as work continued. workers worked far more in hopes of finding gold themselves, which led to them working more hours.

The Lassen Irrigation Company is now responsible for the three reservoirs of the area; Mccoy Flat, Hog Flat, and Lake Leavitt. Lake Leavitt is part of the Honey Lake Valley irrigation system to conserve storm water from Susan River the Mccoy Flat Reservoir releases from its storage of water.

== Statistics ==
Lake Leavitt Dam is an earth dam constructed by the Lassen Irrigation Company. It is 8,800 feet (2,700 meters) in length, has a height of 17 feet (5.2 meters) above water, and has a width of 12 feet (3.7 meters). The reservoir capacity is 7,482 acre-feet (9,229,000 m^{3}). It has a res. area of 1,142 acres (462 ha) and a drainage area of 9.3 square miles (24 km^{2}). Its crest elevation is 4,101 feet (1,250 meters).

== Leavitt Lake Community Service District ==
The Leavitt Lake Community Service District is a suburb of Susanville within Lassen County. They give sewer services to the people within this area and are responsible for maintaining the sewer pipes. The population they give services to is under 1000 people. They have 2.5 miles (4.0 km) of pipe ranging from 6 to 10 inches (15 to 25 cm) in diameter.

== Leavitt Lake Ranches ==
Other groups have sought to help the environment include the Leavitt Lake Ranches. The Wood family, part of the Leavitt Lake Ranches, was awarded the environmental stewardship award at the 2009 Cattle Industry Summer Conference. The Wood family grew their ranch slowly over time, allowing for integration between cattle and the endangered species found in the area to occur. They coordinated with Transportation Network Companies (TNC) and the Nature Conservancy to create a vernal pool restoration plan to increase the habitats for the threatened species. The species helped include waterfowl, mule deer, pronghorn antelope, and other local species. Other systems were put into place to reduce damages done to reduce erosion and allowed for nutritional testing of fecal matter from the livestock.
