= Deep Lake (California) =

Lake in the state of California, United States

- Location within California Location within the United States
- Location: Siskiyou County, California, United States
- Coordinates: 41.5698557°N 123.1130978°W
- Type: Lake
- Basin countries: United States

Deep Lake is a 66-acre (270,000 m^{2}) lake in Siskiyou County, California.

== See also ==
- List of lakes in California
