= Adobe Reservoir =

Reservoir in Lake County, California, US

- Location within California Location within the United States
- Location: Lake County, California
- Coordinates: 38°56′30.0″N 122°53′25.4″W
- Type: reservoir

Adobe Reservoir is the smaller of two adjacent reservoirs in Lake County, California, the other being Highland Springs Reservoir. The reservoir is fed by Adobe Creek and does contain fish, although a recent survey by the California Department of Fish and Wildlife were unable to identify the species. However, California roach (Hesperoleucus symmetricus) specimens were collected upstream from Adobe Reservoir in Adobe Creek. In 2005, a wildlife survey published by PRBO Conservation Science listed which and what number of species were at the reservoir. The most populous species of the reservoir, in order, were mallard, cinnamon teal, American coot, red-winged blackbird, yellow-headed blackbird and ring-necked duck.
