= Senator Wash Reservoir =

Reservoir in Imperial County, California, United States

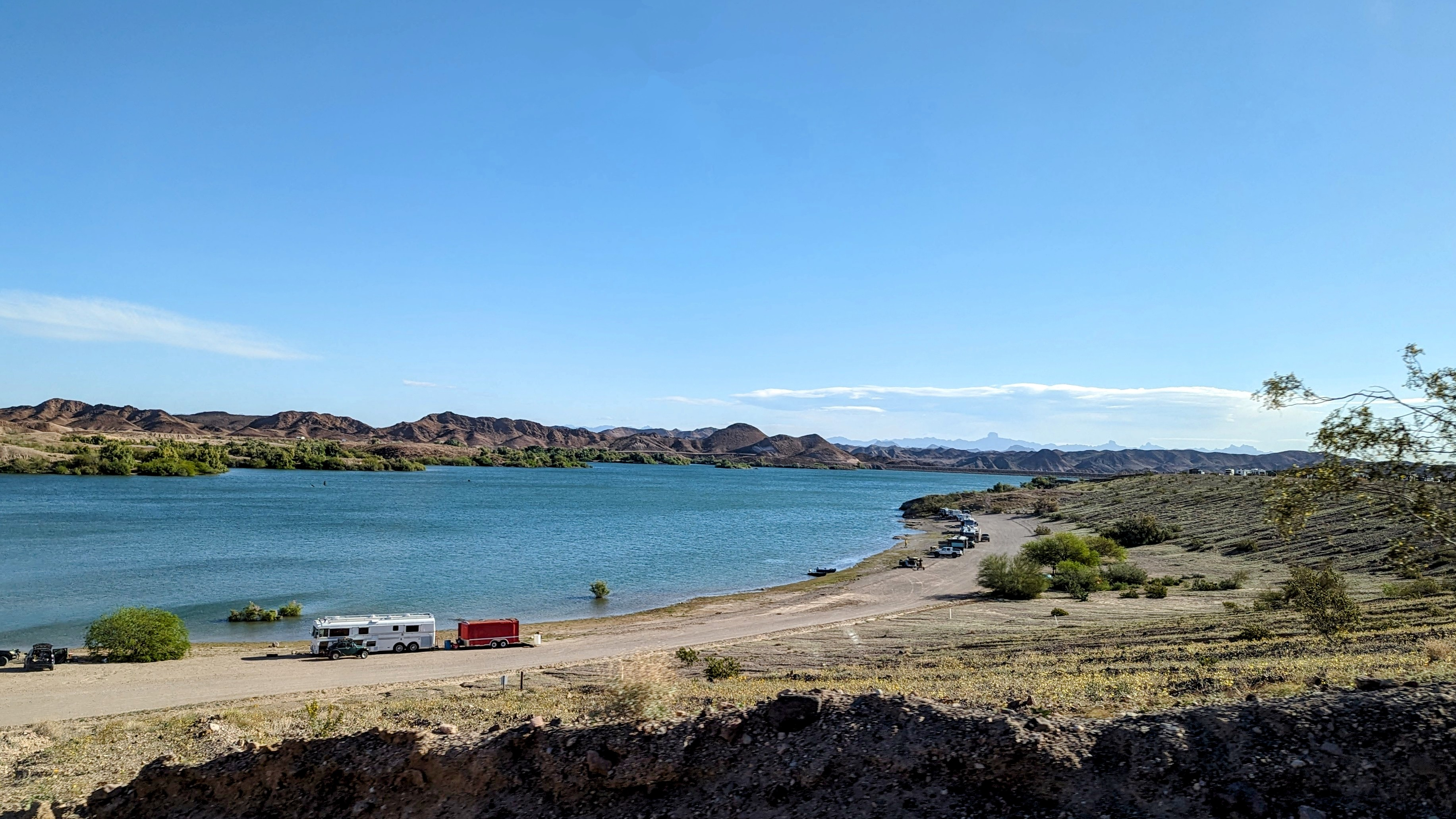
- South Shore of Senator Wash Reservoir

- Location of within California Location within the United States
- Location: Imperial County, California; United States
- Coordinates: 32°54′30″N 114°29′13″W
- Type: reservoir
- Primary inflows: Colorado River
- Primary outflows: Colorado River
- Basin countries: United States
- Surface area: 1,322 acres (5.35 km^{2})
- Water volume: 14,000 acre-feet (17,000,000 m^{3})
- Surface elevation: 240 ft (73 m)

Senator Wash Reservoir is a reservoir located in the Lower Colorado River Valley near Yuma, Arizona on the California side of the Colorado River in the United States. It was created in 1960 and serves to store water from the Colorado River.

== Recreation ==
The Bureau of Land Management operates camping sites on the north and south shores of Senator Wash.

== See also ==
- List of lakes of California
- List of lakes of the Colorado Desert
