= Piute Ponds =

Freshwater wetlands in Los Angeles County, California, United States

- Piute Reservoir
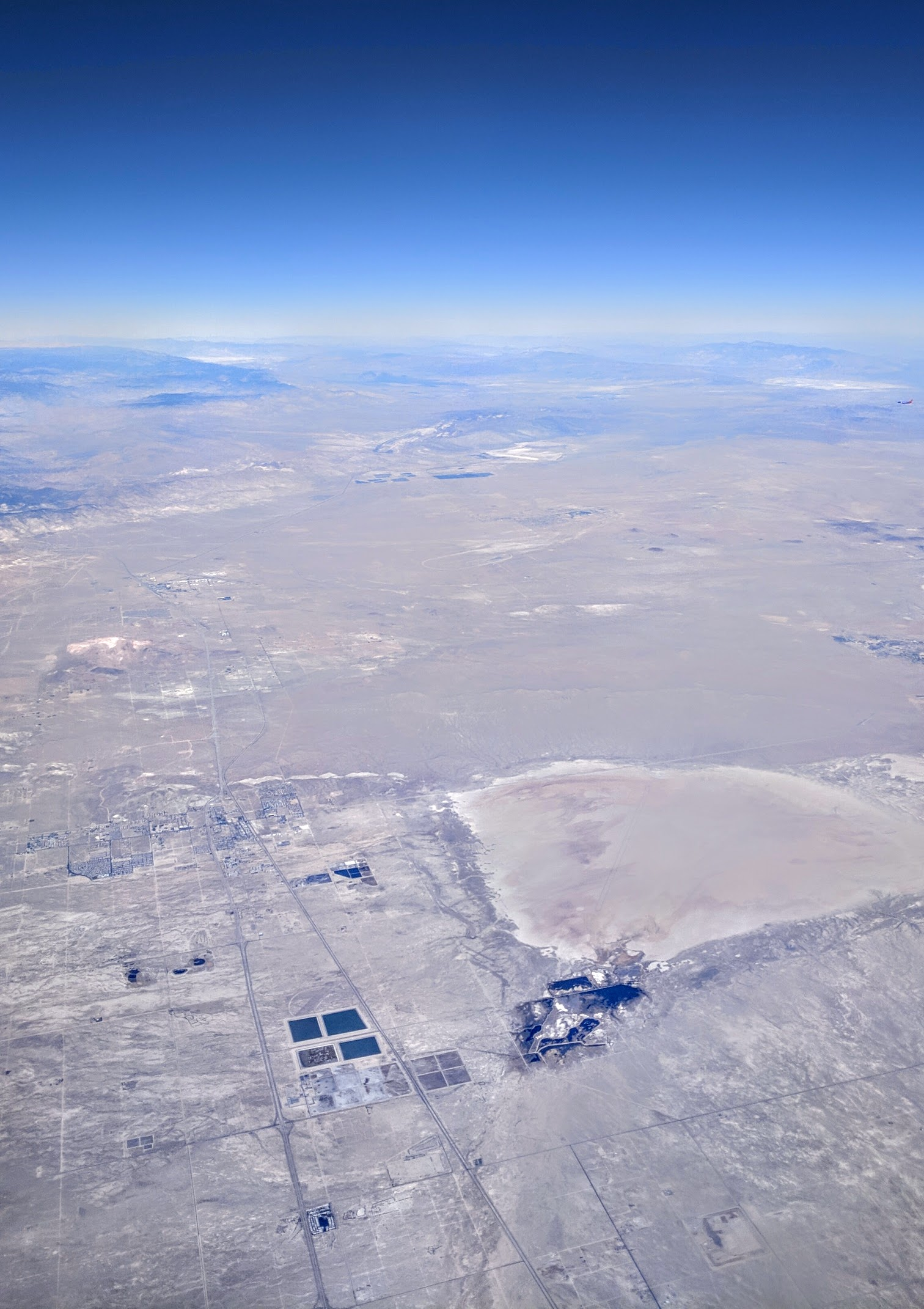
- Aerial view from the south of Rosamond Lake and Piute Ponds

- Location within California Location within the United States
- Interactive map of Piute Ponds
- Location: Mojave Desert; Los Angeles County, California
- Coordinates: 34°47′29″N 118°6′52″W
- Type: Ponds; Wetland
- Part of: Piute Ponds Complex
- Primary inflows: Amargosa Creek
- Basin countries: United States
- Managing agency: Harley Berhow Recreational Area
- Designation: Protected
- Surface area: 5,614 acres (2,272 ha)
- Max. depth: 60.56 feet (18.46 m)
- Surface elevation: 2,284 feet (696 m)
- Settlements: Edwards Air Force Base
- Website: Base website
- References: GNIS

Piute Ponds are a group of ponds located about 6.2 miles (10 km) southeast of Rosamond, California, United States, in the Mojave Desert, within Edwards Air Force Base and on the southern margin of Rosamond Lake, a dry lake bed. They form part of the Harley Berhow Recreational Area and are home to over 200 species of migratory birds.

== Description ==
The largest remaining freshwater wetlands in Los Angeles County, the site is cited as an important bird area of California, and a resting ground for over 200 species of migratory birds such as the great blue heron, the great horned owl, the black-crowned night heron, and the western snowy plover. The area covers an area of about 9,600 acres (3,900 ha) and contains a number of claypan ponds such as Big Piute, Little Piute, Teal Pond, Ducks Unlimited Pond and Amargosa Creek and several other smaller ponds, creeks, and low sand dunes. A dike created the ponds, and they are maintained by treated reclaimed water pumped from Lancaster's sewage treatment plant, with channels augmenting the ponds into two principal sets of large ponds. Some 170 acres (69 ha) of wetlands were added to the complex of marshes in the late 1980s or early 1990s. Restricted hunting is permitted with a license in the fall, and the Piute Ponds Tour is conducted for tourists and bird enthusiasts.

== Studies ==
The Piute Ponds have been studied extensively by ornithologists such as Kimball Garrett who collected data here over many years. Studies conducted in the late 1990s estimated that the marshes of Piute were home to over 150,000 frogs. In 1990, vertebrate fossils were unearthed from lacustrine silts and sands at the site. The Mojave Environmental Education Consortium (MEEC) provides education kits for children for field studies in the ponds, with a night sounds CD, casting kits, owl pellet kits, a field press and dryers, magnifying glasses, vials, and microscopes and other equipment.
