= Naraghi Lake =

Lake in the state of California, United States

- Location within California
- Location: Modesto, Stanislaus County, California
- Coordinates: 37°40′55″N 120°57′37″W
- Type: artificial lake
- Surface area: 13 acres (5.3 ha)

Naraghi Lake is an artificial lake within the central valley city of Modesto, in Stanislaus County, California.

== History ==
Naraghi Lake was excavated in the 1980s as one of a planned series of water features intended for a substantial residential and commercial development complex situated across both sides of Oakdale Road. The lake derives its name from the Naraghi family, prominent landowners in the area who spearheaded the initial development plans. However, shortly after the excavation of the lake, the Naraghi development project encountered financial and market difficulties, resulting in its abandonment. Consequently, the lake stood as the sole vestige of the unrealized development plan. Subsequently, the surrounding land was sold off and developed as per new initiatives. Despite the change in ownership of the surrounding land, Naraghi Lake remains under the ownership of the Naraghi family.

It was open to the public for fishing and recreational use until 2004, when liability issues and problems related to people dumping invasive species into the lake including a fish related to the piranha, finally prompted the Naraghi family to fence in the perimeter.

Over the years, various proposals for the land surrounding Naraghi Lake have been deliberated. These include transforming it into a city park, constructing private residences along its perimeter, and developing apartment or office complexes on the property. However, the implementation of these plans has been hindered by the dwindling amount of available land surrounding the lake. Consequently, many of these proposals have stalled at the discussion phase and have not progressed further.

== Geography ==
The surface area of the lake is 13 acres (5.3 ha).

Naraghi Lake is supplied from MID canals and pipelines. It was built by excavating a hole in the otherwise flat terrain and was lined with bentonite to eliminate percolation.

== Fish ==
The commonly found fish in the lake are Largemouth Bass, Smallmouth Bass, Crappie, Catfish, Spotted Bass, White Bass, Striped Bass, and Trout. Other wildlife like ducks and geese can also be found in and near the lake.

== See also ==
- List of lakes in California
