= Thurston Lake =

Lake in the state of California, United States

- Location within California Location within the United States
- Location: Lake County, California
- Coordinates: 38°55′43.8″N 122°40′17.2″W
- Type: lake
- Surface elevation: 1,388 feet (423 m)

Thurston Lake is a lake adjacent to the southeast side of the much larger Clear Lake. in Northern California.

In the past, volcanic deposits formed a ridge separating Thurston Lake from Clear Lake. The lake is notably turbid, the result of clayey runoff from nearby Manning Flat.
