= Quarry Lakes Regional Recreation Area =

Park in Fremont, California, United States

Coordinates: 37°34′37″N 122°0′23″W

Quarry Lakes
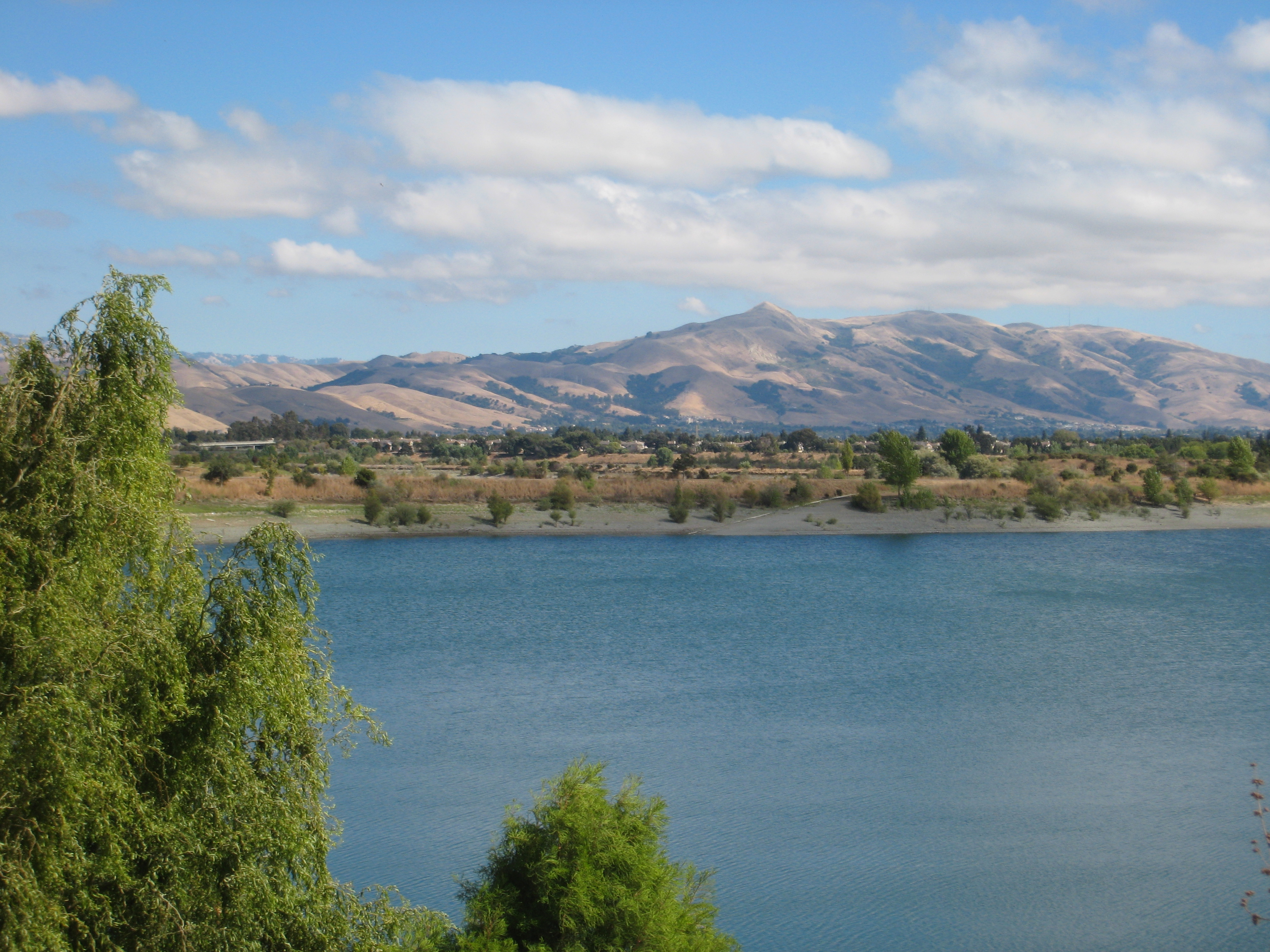
- A view of Mission Peak from Lago Los Osos.
- Interactive map of Quarry Lakes
- Type: Regional park
- Location: Fremont, California
- Area: 471 acres (191 ha)
- Created: 1997-2000
- Operator: East Bay Regional Parks
- Website: https://www.ebparks.org/parks/quarry_lakes

Quarry Lakes Regional Recreation Area is a regional park located in Fremont, California that is part of the East Bay Regional Parks system. Before being converted into a park, the site was used as a gravel quarry. When water purchased by the public for groundwater recharge of the Niles Cone flooded the gravel pits, the gravel harvesters began to daily pump the seeping water down Alameda Creek into San Francisco Bay. The Alameda County Water District acquired the quarry after the pumping was declared to be an illegal waste in 1976.

The Park is located roughly between Centerville and Niles. It is bounded to the northeast by the train tracks of the BART system, and to the south and west by Alameda Creek.

== History ==
As early as 1912, the Niles Sand and Gravel Company operated a gravel plant along the south bank of Alameda Creek in Niles, processing gravel and sand from the river bed for concrete production. In 1954, the company expanded into the area now in the park, acquiring an operation previously managed by Black Point Aggregates. By 1969, some of the gravel pits had been dug down to 120 feet below the surface, well below the water table. To continue extraction at this point, the company pumped the water flooding the pits out into adjacent Alameda Creek at a rate of five million gallons a day, enough to continuously supply 30,000 people.

In 1972, the Niles Sand and Gravel Company sued the Alameda County Water District, arguing that its groundwater recharge program constituted a damaging of their ability to use the quarry. After finding that the replenishment program served a beneficial purpose in combating seawater intrusion from the San Francisco Bay and that the gravel pits would have flooded naturally even if the program were not in place, the court ruled against the company, declaring its pumping to be an illegal waste of groundwater.

Between 1975 and 1992, the EBRPD and ACWD purchased the land which would become Quarry Lakes. The two agencies began to convert the area into parkland in 1997, with the ACWD continuing to pursue restoration projects beyond 2017.

== Bodies of water ==
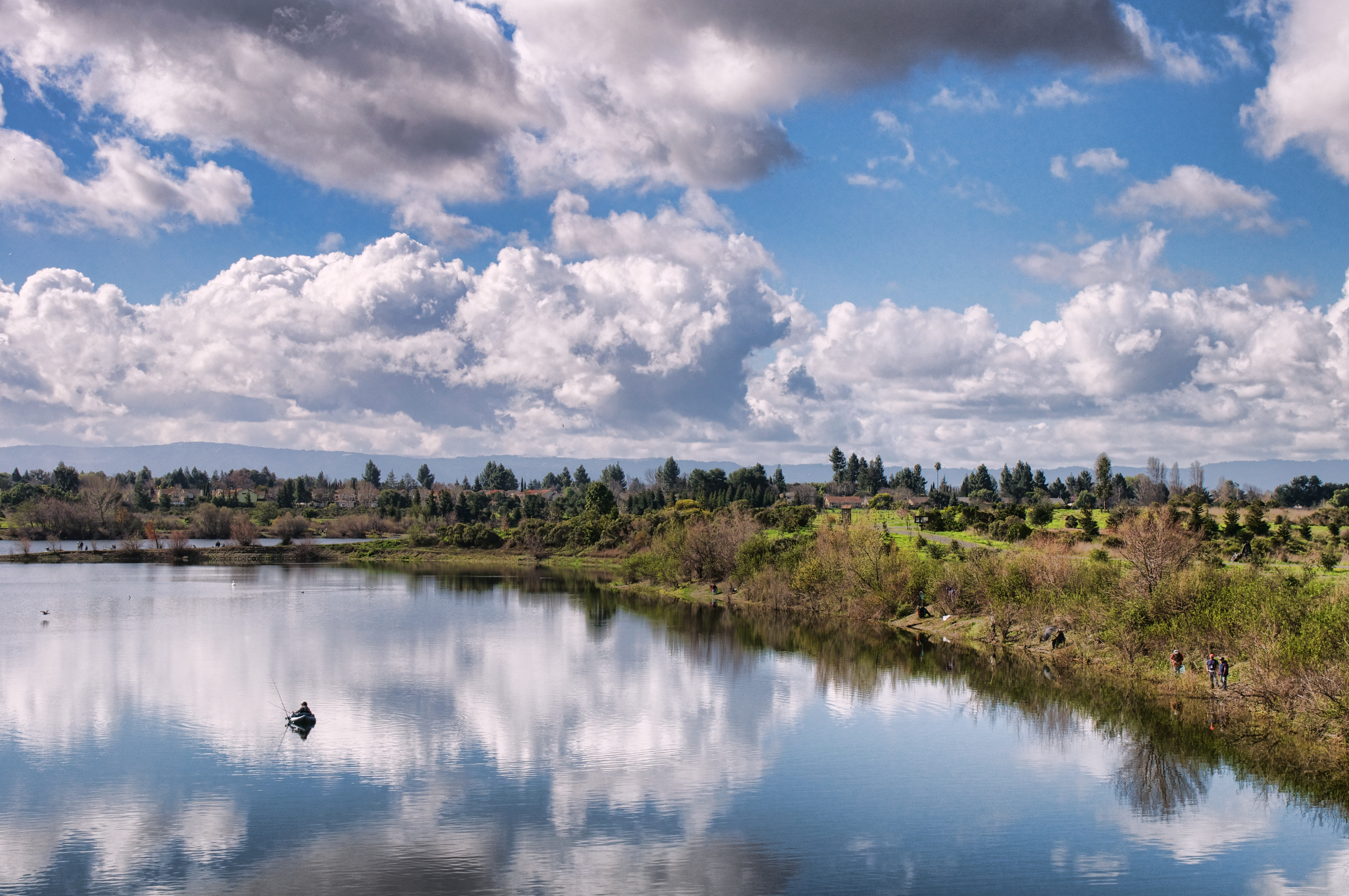
Fishermen at Horseshoe Lake.

Due to the important role the lakes play in groundwater percolation, only Rainbow Lake and Horseshoe Lake are open to the public for water contact. Only Horseshoe lake is stocked regularly with rainbow trout and channel catfish, while Rainbow Lake has a resident population of largemouth bass, smallmouth bass and other warmwater fish species. Fishing is allowed with a permit. Horseshoe Lake also includes a swimming complex and a pier for boating, although no gasoline motors are allowed to avoid water contamination.

Lago Los Osos and Willow Slough are open to nature observation, but water contact is not allowed. Two additional unnamed lakes are closed entirely to the public for use by the ACWD.

=== List of lakes ===
- Horseshoe Lake
- Rainbow Lake
- Lago Los Osos
- Willow Slough

== Wildlife ==
Quarry Lakes is home to over fifty species of wildflower, as well as a rare fruit grove on the peninsula of Horseshoe Lake, which contains both native and exotic trees and shrubs. At the south end of the park is a sizeable grove of bald cypress. In 2010, a demonstration garden of native and drought resistant plants was started along Horseshoe Lake through a University of California Extension.

As one of few riparian zones in a near-natural state along Alameda Creek, Quarry Lakes serves an important role in harboring migratory birds. Thanks to restoration projects in the park, the area has attracted wood ducks, great blue herons, snowy egrets, and other water birds. Nesting boxes and berry planting have also brought smaller birds like tree swallows, northern flickers, and salt marsh yellowthroats.

== Gallery ==
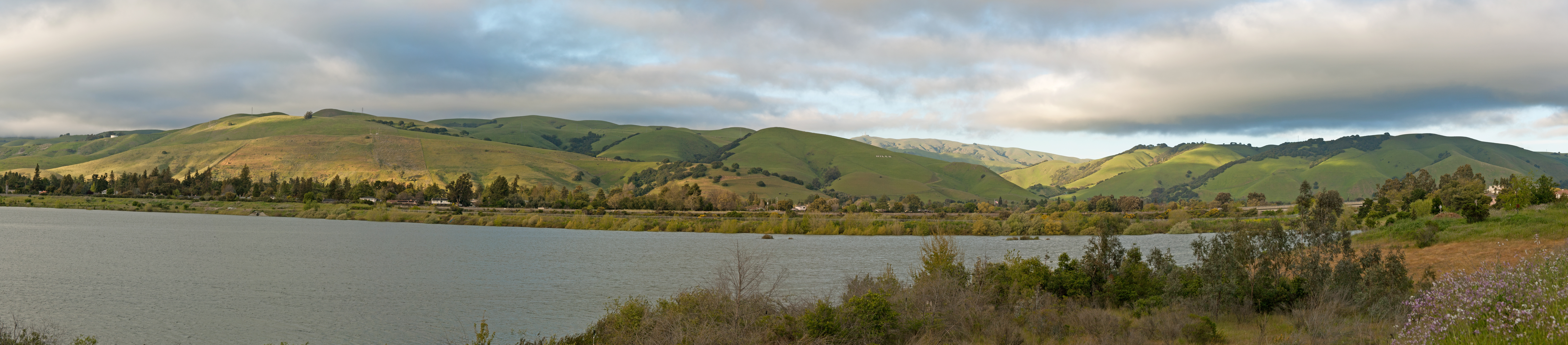
Horseshoe Lake in the Quarry Lakes Regional Recreation Area, with Niles' hills in the background.
