= List of dams and reservoirs in California =

Following is a list of dams and reservoirs in California in a sortable table. There are over 1,400 named dams and 1,300 named reservoirs in the state of California.

== Dams in service ==
Reservoir	Dam	River	County	Owner	Completed	Type	Height of dam (Note: The "height" listed is the vertical distance from the crest of the dam to the original stream bed at the downstream toe of the dam—hydraulic height, not foundation height.)		Reservoir capacity	
Reservoir	Dam	River	County	Owner	Completed	Type	(ft)	(m)	(acre ft)	(1,000 m^{3})
Almaden Reservoir	Almaden Dam	Alamitos Creek	Santa Clara	Santa Clara Valley Water District	1935	Earth	108	33	1,586	1,956
Alpine Lake	Alpine Dam	Lagunitas Creek	Marin	Marin Municipal Water District	1917	Gravity	143	44	8,892	10,968
Anderson Lake	Leroy Anderson Dam	Coyote Creek	Santa Clara	Santa Clara Valley Water District	1950	Earth	235	72	91,280	112,590
Antelope Lake	Antelope Dam	Upper Indian Creek	Plumas	California Department of Water Resources	1965	Earth	120	37	22,566	27,835
Balsam Forebay	Balsam Meadow Dam	Balsam Creek, West Fork	Fresno	Southern California Edison	1986	Rock-fill	127	39	2,040	2,500
Barker Reservoir	Barker Dam	off-stream reservoir	Riverside	Joshua Tree National Park	1949	?	15	4.6	290	?
Barrett Lake	Barrett Dam	Cottonwood Creek	San Diego County	San Diego	1923	Concrete gravity	171	52	34,206	42,192
Bass Lake	Crane Valley Dam	Willow Creek, North Fork	Madera	Pacific Gas and Electric Company	1910	Hydraulic fill	145	44	45,410	56,010
Bear Gulch Reservoir	Bear Gulch Dam	off-stream reservoir	San Mateo	California Water Service Company	1896	Earth	61	19	672	829
Bear River Reservoir	Bear River Dam	Bear River	Amador	Pacific Gas and Electric Company	1900	Rock-fill	83	25	6,818	8,410
Beardsley Lake	Beardsley Dam	Stanislaus River, Middle Fork	Tuolumne	Oakdale & South San Joaquin Irrigation Districts	1957	Earth and rock	278	85	70,600	87,000
Bethany Reservoir	Bethany Forebay Dam	Italian Slough tributary	Alameda	California Department of Water Resources	1961	Earth	95	29	5,250	6,480
Big Bear Lake	Bear Valley Dam	Bear Creek	San Bernardino	Big Bear Municipal Water District	1911	Multiple arch	80	24	74,000	91,000
Big Dry Creek Reservoir	Big Dry Creek Dam	Dry Creek and Dog Creek	Fresno	Fresno Metropolitan Flood Control District	1948	Earth	50	15	30,200	37,300
Big Sage Reservoir	Big Sage Dam	Rattlesnake Creek	Modoc	Hot Springs Valley Irrigation District	1921	Earth	49	15	77,000	95,000
Big Tujunga Reservoir	Big Tujunga Dam	Big Tujunga Creek	Los Angeles	Los Angeles County Department of Public Works	1931	Variable radius arch	208	63	5,750	7,090
Black Butte Lake	Black Butte Dam	Stony Creek	Tehama and Glenn	United States Army Corps of Engineers	1963	Earth	156	48	143,700	177,300
Boca Reservoir	Boca Dam	Little Truckee River	Nevada	United States Bureau of Reclamation	1939	Earth	93	28	41,110	50,720
Bon Tempe Lake	Bon Tempe Dam	Lagunitas Creek	Marin	Marin Municipal Water District	1949	Earth	98	30	4,300	5,300
Bouquet Reservoir	Bouquet Canyon Dam	Bouquet Creek	Los Angeles	Los Angeles Department of Water and Power	1934	Earth	190	58	36,505	45,028
Bowman Lake	Bowman Dam	Canyon Creek	Nevada	Nevada Irrigation District	1927	Rock-fill	175	53	64,000	79,000
Bridgeport Reservoir	Bridgeport Dam	East Walker River	Mono	Walker River Irrigation District	1924	Earth	63	19	44,100	54,400
Briones Reservoir	Briones Dam	Bear Creek	Contra Costa	East Bay Municipal Utility District	1964	Earth	273	83	67,520	83,280
Brush Creek Reservoir	Brush Creek Dam	Brush Creek	El Dorado	Sacramento Municipal Utility District	1970	Variable radius arch	213	65	1,530	1,890
Bucks Lake	Bucks Storage Dam	Bucks Creek	Plumas	Pacific Gas and Electric Company	1928	Rock-fill	122	37	103,000	127,000
Butt Valley Reservoir	Butt Valley Dam	Butt Creek	Plumas	Pacific Gas and Electric Company	1924	Hydraulic fill	106	32	49,800	61,400
Buena Vista Lake	Buena Vista Dam	off-stream reservoir	Kern	J. Boswell & Tenneco West	1890	Earth	20	6.1	205,000	253,000
Calaveras Reservoir	Calaveras Dam	Calaveras Creek	Alameda	City and County of San Francisco	1925	Hydraulic fill	210	64	30,000 (restricted due to seismic hazard)	37,000
Calero Reservoir	Calero Dam	Calero Creek	Santa Clara	Santa Clara Valley Water District	1935	Earth	90	27	9,850	12,100
Camanche Reservoir	Camanche Dam	Mokelumne River	San Joaquin, Amador, and Calaveras	East Bay Municipal Utility District	1963	Earth	171	52	417,120	514,510
Camp Far West Reservoir	Camp Far West Dam	Bear River	Yuba	South Sutter Water District	1963	Earth and rock	185	56	104,500	128,900
Canyon Lake	Railroad Canyon Dam	San Jacinto River	Riverside	Elsinore Valley Municipal Water District	1928	Variable radius arch	94	29	11,900	14,600
Caples Lake	Caples Lake Dam	Silver Fork tributary	Alpine	El Dorado Irrigation District	1922	Earth and rock	71	22	21,580	26,620
Carbon Canyon Reservoir	Carbon Canyon Dam	Carbon Canyon Creek	Orange	United States Army Corps of Engineers	1961	Earth	99	30	6,615	8,160
Castaic Lake	Castaic Dam	Castaic Creek	Los Angeles	California Department of Water Resources	1973	Earth	340	100	323,700	399,300
Cedar Lake	Cedar Lake Dam	Talmadge Creek	San Bernardino	First Congregational Church of Los Angeles	1928	Arch dam	28	8.5	30	37
Cherry Lake	Cherry Valley Dam	Cherry Creek	Tuolumne	City and County of San Francisco	1956	Earth and rock	315	96	273,500	337,400
Chesbro Reservoir	Elmer Chesbro Dam	Llagas Creek	Santa Clara	Santa Clara Valley Water District	1955	Earth and rock	95	29	8,952	11,042
Clear Lake	Cache Creek Dam	Cache Creek	Lake	Yolo County Flood Control and Water Conservation District	1914	Gravity	30	9.1	1,155,000 (Note: Clear Lake is a natural lake. The dam adds only 315,000 acre-feet (389,000,000 m^{3}) of capacity and controls only the top 7 feet (2.1 m) of the lake.)	1,425,000
Clear Lake Reservoir	Clear Lake Dam	Lost River	Modoc	United States Bureau of Reclamation	1910	Rock-fill	32	9.8	451,000	556,000
Clifton Court Forebay	Clifton Court Forebay Dam	Old River tributary	Contra Costa	California Department of Water Resources	1970	Earth	34	10	29,000	36,000
Cogswell Reservoir	Cogswell Dam	San Gabriel River, West Fork	Los Angeles	Los Angeles County Department of Public Works	1935	Rock-fill	266	81	8,969	11,063
Collins Lake	Virginia Ranch Dam	Dry Creek (Yuba River)	Yuba	Browns Valley Irrigation District	1963	Earth	152	46	57,000	70,000
Copco Lake	Copco No 1 Dam	Klamath River	Siskiyou	PacifiCorp	1922	Gravity	132	40	77,000	95,000
Courtright Reservoir	Courtright Dam	Helms Creek	Fresno	Pacific Gas and Electric Company	1958	Rock-fill	315	96	123,300	151,700
Coyote Lake	Coyote Dam	Coyote Creek	Santa Clara	Santa Clara Valley Water District	1936	Earth and rock	138	42	22,925	28,278
Crowley Lake	Long Valley Dam	Owens River	Mono	City of Los Angeles	1941	Earth	126	38	183,465	226,300
Crystal Springs Reservoir	Lower Crystal Springs Dam	San Mateo Creek	San Mateo	City and County of San Francisco	1888	Gravity	149	45	57,910	71,430
Diamond Valley Lake	Diamond Valley Dam	Domenigoni Valley Creek	Riverside	Metropolitan Water District of Southern California	1999	Earth and rock	284	87	800,000	987,000
Dodge Reservoir	Red Rock No. 1 Dam	Red Rock Creek	Lassen	Edgar S. Roberts	1893	Earth	63	19	10,000	12,000
Don Pedro Reservoir	New Don Pedro Dam	Tuolumne River	Tuolumne	Modesto Irrigation District and Turlock Irrigation District	1971	Earth and rock	568	173	2,030,000	2,504,000
Donnell Lake	Donnells Dam	Stanislaus River, Middle Fork	Tuolumne	Oakdale Irrigation District and South San Joaquin Irrigation District	1958	Variable radius arch	291	89	56,893	70,176
Donner Lake	Donner Lake Dam	Donner Creek	Nevada	Truckee Meadows Water Authority	1927	Slab and buttress	16	4.9	10,300 (Note: Donner Lake is a natural lake. The dam adds only 10,300 acre-feet (12,700,000 m^{3}) of capacity and controls only the top 10 feet (3.0 m) of the lake.)	12,700
Duvall Lake	Duvall Dam	Pope Creek tributary	Napa	Jerome W. Komes	1940	Earth	30	9.1	242	299
East Park Reservoir	East Park Dam	Little Stony Creek	Colusa	United States Bureau of Reclamation	1910	Concrete gravity	92	28	51,000	63,000
Eastman Lake	Buchanan Dam	Chowchilla River	Madera and Mariposa	United States Army Corps of Engineers	1975	Earth and rock	192	59	150,000	185,000
Eaton Wash Reservoir	Eaton Wash Dam	Eaton Wash	Los Angeles	Los Angeles County Department of Public Works	1937	Rock-fill	63	19	721	889
El Capitan Reservoir	El Capitan Dam	San Diego River	San Diego	City of San Diego	1934	Hydraulic fill	237	72	112,800	139,100
Elderberry Forebay	Elderberry Forebay Dam	Castaic Creek	Los Angeles	California Department of Water Resources	1974	Earth	179	55	28,400	35,000
Englebright Lake	Englebright Dam	Yuba River	Yuba	United States Army Corps of Engineers	1941	Variable radius arch	280	85	70,000	86,000
Fallen Leaf Lake	Fallen Leaf Dam	Taylor Creek	El Dorado	United States Forest Service	1934	Gravity	12	3.7	6,800	8,400
Farmington Flood Control Basin	Farmington Dam	Rock Creek and Little John Creek	San Joaquin	United States Army Corps of Engineers	1951	Earth	58	18	52,000	64,000
Florence Lake	Florence Lake Dam	San Joaquin River, South Fork	Fresno	Southern California Edison	1926	Multiple arch	149	45	64,406	79,444
Folsom Lake	Folsom Dam	American River	Sacramento, Placer and El Dorado	United States Army Corps of Engineers	1956	Gravity	275	84	975,000	1,203,000
Foster Lake	Foster Lake Dam	Lily Creek	Riverside	Idyllwild Water District		Earth			55	68
French Lake Reservoir	French Lake Dam	Canyon Creek	Nevada	Nevada Irrigation District	1859/1948	Rock-fill	100	30	55	15,400
French Meadows Reservoir	L.L. Anderson Dam	American River, Middle Fork	Placer	Placer County Water Authority	1965	Earth and rock	231	70	111,333	137,327
Frenchman Lake	Frenchman Dam	Little Last Chance Creek	Plumas	California Department of Water Resources	1961	Earth	129	39	55,477	68,430
Gene Wash Reservoir	Gene Wash Dam		San Bernardino							
Gibraltar Reservoir	Gibraltar Dam	Santa Ynez River	Santa Barbara	City of Santa Barbara	1920	Constant radius arch	169	52	9,998	12,332
Grant Lake	Grant Lake Dam	Rush Creek	Mono	City of Los Angeles	1940	Earth	87	27	47,525	58,622
Guadalupe Reservoir	Guadalupe Dam	Guadalupe Creek	Santa Clara	Santa Clara Valley Water District	1935	Earth	142	43	3,460	4,270
Hahamongna	Devil's Gate	Arroyo Seco	Los Angeles	Los Angeles County Department of Public Works	1920	Gravity and rock	?	?	?	?
Hansen Flood-Control Reservoir	Hansen Dam	Tujunga Wash	Los Angeles	United States Army Corps of Engineers	1940	Earth	97	30	25,446	31,387
Hensley Lake	Hidden Dam	Fresno River	Madera	United States Army Corps of Engineers	1974	Earth	163	50	90,000	111,000
Hernandez Reservoir	Hernandez Dam	San Benito River	San Benito	San Benito County Water District	1962	Earth	124	38	18,000	22,000
Hetch Hetchy Reservoir	O'Shaughnessy Dam	Tuolumne River	Tuolumne	City and County of San Francisco	1923	Gravity	312	95	360,000	444,000
Hollywood Reservoir	Mulholland Dam	Weid Canyon	Los Angeles	Los Angeles Department of Water and Power	1924	Gravity	195	59	4,036	4,978
Hume Lake	Hume Lake Dam	Ten Mile Creek	Fresno	United States Forest Service	1908	Multiple arch	51	16	1,410	1,740
Huntington Lake	Huntington Dams 1, 2, 3, and 4	Big Creek	Fresno	Southern California Edison	1913/1919	Gravity	?	?	89,166	109,985
Imperial Reservoir	Imperial Diversion Dam	Colorado River	Imperial	United States Bureau of Reclamation	1938	Gravity	23	7.0	1,000	1,200
Indian Valley Reservoir	Indian Valley Dam	Cache Creek, North Fork	Lake	Yolo County Flood Control and Water Conservation District	1976	Earth	222	68	300,000	370,000
Iron Canyon Reservoir	Iron Canyon Dam	Iron Canyon Creek	Shasta	Pacific Gas and Electric Company	1965	Earth	210	64	24,300	30,000
Iron Gate Reservoir	Iron Gate Dam	Klamath River	Siskiyou	PacifiCorp	1962	Earth and rock	188	57	58,000	72,000
Ivanhoe Reservoir	Ivanhoe Reservoir Dam	Manmade	Los Angeles	Los Angeles Department of Water and Power	1906	Earth	?	?	?	?
Jackson Meadows Reservoir	Jackson Meadows Dam	Yuba River, Middle Fork	Nevada	Nevada Irrigation District	1965	Rock-fill	195	59	52,500	64,800
Jenkinson Lake	Sly Park Dam	Sly Park Creek	El Dorado	El Dorado Irrigation District	1955	Earth	182	55	41,000	51,000
Kent Lake	Peters Dam	Lagunitas Creek	Marin	Marin Municipal Water District	1954	Earth	230	70	32,900	40,600
Keswick Reservoir	Keswick Dam	Sacramento River	Shasta	United States Bureau of Reclamation	1950	Gravity	118	36	23,772	29,345
Lafayette Reservoir			Contra Costa	East Bay Municipal Utility District	1933	Open-cut			4,296	5,299
La Grange Reservoir	La Grange Dam	Tuolumne River	Stanislaus and Tuolumne	Turlock Irrigation District	1894	Gravity	131	40	500	620
Lake Almanor	Canyon Dam	Feather River, North Fork	Plumas	Pacific Gas and Electric Company	1927	Hydraulic fill	130	40	1,308,000	1,613,000
Lake Aloha	Medley Lakes Dam	American River, South Fork, Tributary	El Dorado	El Dorado Irrigation District	1923	Gravity	21	6	5,350	6,600
Lake Alpine	Alpine Dam	Silver Creek	Alpine	Northern California Power Agency	1906	Rock	49	15	4,122	5,084
Lake Amador	Jackson Creek Dam	Jackson Creek	Amador	Jackson Valley Irrigation District	1965	Earth and rock	193	59	22,000	27,000
Lake Arrowhead Reservoir	Lake Arrowhead Dam	Little Bear Creek	San Bernardino	Arrowhead Lake Association	1922	Hydraulic fill	190	58	48,000	59,000
Lake Berryessa	Monticello Dam	Putah Creek	Napa	United States Bureau of Reclamation	1957	Variable radius arch	255	78	1,602,000	1,976,000
Lake Britton	Pit 3 Dam	Pit River	Shasta	Pacific Gas and Electric Company	1925	Concrete gravity	120	37	34,600	42,678
Cachuma Lake	Bradbury Dam	Santa Ynez River	Santa Barbara	United States Bureau of Reclamation	1953	Earth	201	61	205,000	253,000
Lake Calero	Calero Dam	Deer Creek	Sacramento	Rancho Murieta Community Services District	1982	Earth	55	17	2,832	3,493
Lake Casitas	Casitas Dam	Coyote Creek	Ventura	United States Bureau of Reclamation	1959	Earth	279	85	254,000	313,000
Lake Clementine	North Fork Dam	North Fork American River	Placer	United States Army Corps of Engineers	1939	Variable radius arch	155	47	14,700	18,100
Lake Davis	Grizzly Valley Dam	Big Grizzly Creek	Plumas	California Department of Water Resources	1966	Earth and rock	115	35	83,000	102,000
Lake Del Valle	Del Valle Dam	Arroyo Valle	Alameda	California Department of Water Resources	1968	Earth	222	68	77,100	95,100
Lake Eleanor	Banning Dam	Eleanor Creek	Ventura	Conejo Open Space Conservation Agency	1889	Gravity	37	11	?	?
Lake Elsman	Austrian Dam	Los Gatos Creek	Santa Clara	San Jose Water Agency	1950	Earth	185	56	6,200	7,650
Lake Fulmor	Hall Mill Dam	Indian Creek	Riverside	U.S. Forest Service						
Lake Gallaher	Gallaher Dam	Bear Trap Creek	Riverside	California Inland Empire Council, Boy Scouts of America	1966					
Lake Gregory	Lake Gregory Dam	Houston Creek	San Bernardino	San Bernardino County Regional Parks Division	1938	Earth	90	27	2,100	2,600
Lake Havasu	Parker Dam	Colorado River	San Bernardino and Mohave	United States Bureau of Reclamation	1938	Variable radius arch	75	23	648,000	799,000
Lake Hemet	Lake Hemet Dam	San Jacinto River	Riverside	Lake Hemet Municipal Water District	1895	Masonry (arch)	135	41	8,100	9,800
Lake Hennessey	Conn Creek Dam	Conn Creek	Napa	City of Napa	1946	Earth	125	38	31,000	38,000
Lake Henshaw	Henshaw Dam	San Luis Rey River	San Diego	Vista Irrigation District	1923	Hydraulic fill	123	37.5	53,400	65,700
Lake Hodges	Lake Hodges Dam	San Dieguito River	San Diego	City of San Diego	1918	Multiple arch	131	40	30,250	37,200
Lake Irvine	Santiago Dam	Santiago Creek	Orange	Serrano Water District and Irvine Ranch Water District	1933	Earth	136	41	25,000	31,000
Lake Isabella	Isabella Dam	Kern River	Kern	United States Army Corps of Engineers	1953	Earth	185	56	568,000	701,000
Lake Jennings	Chet Harritt Dam	Quail Canyon Creek	San Diego	Helix Water District	1962	Earth	200	61	9,790	12,080
Lake Kaweah	Terminus Dam	Kaweah River	Tulare	United States Army Corps of Engineers	1962	Earth	255	78	143,000	176,000
Lake Lagunitas	Lagunitas Dam	Lagunitas Creek	Marin	Marin Municipal Water District	1872	Earth	48	15	341	421
Lake Loveland	Loveland Dam	Sweetwater River	San Diego	South Bay Irrigation District	1945	Variable radius arch	203	62	25,400	31,300
Lake Mathews	Mathews Dam	Cajalco Creek tributary	Riverside	Metropolitan Water District of Southern California	1938	Earth	264	80	182,000	224,000
Lake McClure	New Exchequer Dam	Merced River	Mariposa	Merced Irrigation District	1967	Rock-fill	479	146	1,032,000	1,273,000
Lake Mendocino	Coyote Valley Dam	East Fork Russian River	Mendocino	United States Army Corps of Engineers	1959	Earth	164	50	122,400	151,000
Nacimiento Reservoir	Nacimiento Dam	Nacimiento River	San Luis Obispo	Monterey County Water Resources Agency	1958	Rock-fill	210	64	377,900	466,133
Lake Natoma	Nimbus Dam	American River	Sacramento	United States Bureau of Reclamation	1955	Gravity	47	14	8,760	10,810
Lake Oroville	Oroville Dam	Feather River	Butte	California Department of Water Resources	1968	Earth	742	226	3,537,577	4,363,530
Lake Palmdale	Harold Reservoir Dam	Antelope Valley tributary	Los Angeles	Palmdale Water District	1891	Earth	30	9	3,870	4,774
Lake Perris	Perris Dam	Bernasconi Pass	Riverside	California Department of Water Resources	1973	Earth	130	40	131,452	162,143
Lake Pillsbury	Scott Dam	Eel River	Lake	Pacific Gas and Electric Company	1921	Gravity	138	42	73,000	90,000
Lake Piru	Santa Felicia Dam	Piru Creek	Ventura	United Water Conservation District	1955	Earth	213	65	100,000	123,000
Lake Ramona	Ramona Dam	Green Valley Road Creek	San Diego	Ramona Municipal Water District	1988	Earth	228	69	12,200	15,000
Lake Sabrina	Sabrina Dam	Bishop Creek, Middle Fork	Inyo	Southern California Edison	1908	Rock-fill	70	21	8,376	10,332
San Antonio Reservoir	San Antonio Dam	San Antonio River	Monterey	Monterey County Water Resources Agency	1965	Earth	202	62	335,000	413,216
Lake Shastina	Shasta River Dam	Shasta River	Siskiyou	Montague Water Conservation District	1928	Hydraulic fill	96	29	50,000	60,000
Lake Sherwood	Lake Sherwood Dam	Potrero Valley Creek	Ventura	Sherwood Development Company	1904	Constant radius arch	45	14	2,600	3,200
Lake Siskiyou	Box Canyon Dam	Sacramento River	Siskiyou	Siskiyou County Flood Control & Water Conservation District	1969	Gravity	204	62	26,000	32,000
Lake Sonoma	Warm Springs Dam	Dry Creek	Sonoma	United States Army Corps of Engineers	1982	Earth	319	97	381,000	470,000
Lake Spaulding	Lake Spaulding Dam	Yuba River, South Fork	Nevada	Pacific Gas and Electric Company	1913	Variable radius arch	275	84	74,773	92,231
Lake Success	Success Dam	Tule River	Tulare	United States Army Corps of Engineers	1961	Earth	142	43	82,300	101,500
Lake Tahoe	Lake Tahoe Dam	Truckee River	Placer	United States Bureau of Reclamation	1913	Gravity	14	4	732,000 (Note: Lake Tahoe is a natural lake with a volume of 120 million acre-feet (150 km^{3}). The dam controls only the top 6 feet (1.8 m) of the lake.)	903,000
Lake Thomas A Edison	Vermilion Valley Dam	Mono Creek	Fresno	Southern California Edison	1954	Earth	167	51	125,000	154,000
Lake Van Arsdale	Van Arsdale Dam	South Eel River	Mendocino	Pacific Gas and Electric Company	1907	Gravity	96	29	700	860
Lake Wishon	Wishon Dam	North Fork Kings River	Fresno	Pacific Gas and Electric Company	1958	Rock-fill	265	81	118,000	146,000
Lake Yosemite	Lake Yosemite Dam	Merced River tributary	Merced	Merced Irrigation District	1888	Earth	53	16	8,101	9,992
Lewiston Lake	Lewiston Dam	Trinity River	Trinity	United States Bureau of Reclamation	1963	Earth	35.5	10.8	14,660	18,080
Lexington Reservoir	James J. Lenihan Dam	Los Gatos Creek	Santa Clara	Santa Clara Valley Water District	1953	Earth	208	63	19,044	23,490
Little Grass Valley Reservoir	Little Grass Valley Dam	South Fork Feather River	Plumas	South Feather Water and Power Agency	1961	Rock-fill	210	64	93,010	114,730
Little Rock Reservoir	Little Rock Dam	Little Rock Creek	Los Angeles	Little Rock Creek Irrigation District	1924	Gravity	124	38	4,600	5,700
Loch Lomond (California)	Newell Creek Dam	Newell Creek	Santa Cruz	Santa Cruz Water Dept.	1960	Earth	190	58	9,200	11,300
Loon Lake	Loon Lake Dam	Gerle Creek	El Dorado	Sacramento Municipal Utility District	1963	Rock-fill	108	33	76,500	94,500
Lopez Lake	Lopez Dam	Arroyo Grande Creek	San Luis Obispo	San Luis Obispo County Flood Control and Water Conservation District	1969	Earth	166	51	52,500	64,800
Los Padres Reservoir	Los Padres Dam	Carmel River	Monterey	California American Water Company	1949	Earth	148	45	1,775	2,189
Los Vaqueros Reservoir (expanded)	Los Vaqueros Dam	off stream reservoir storing Delta diversions	Contra Costa	Contra Costa Water District	2012	Earth	218	70	160,000	200,000
Lower Bear River Reservoir	Lower Bear River Dam	Bear River, Lower	Amador	Pacific Gas and Electric Company	1952	Rock-fill	253	77	48,750	60,130
Lower Hell Hole Reservoir	Lower Hell Hole Dam	Rubicon River	Placer	Placer County Water Authority	1966	Rock-fill	410	125	208,400	257,100
Lower Otay Reservoir	Savage Dam	Otay River	San Diego	City of San Diego	1919	Gravity	149	45	49,510	61,070
Lyons Reservoir	Lyons Dam	Stanislaus River, South Fork	Tuolumne	Pacific Gas and Electric Company	1930	Arch dam	132	40	6,400	7,894
Malibu Reservoir	Rindge Dam	Malibu Creek	Los Angeles	California Department of Parks and Recreation	1924	Arch	?	?	?	?
Mammoth Pool Reservoir	Mammoth Pool Dam	San Joaquin River	Fresno and Madera	Southern California Edison	1960	Earth	406	124	123,000	152,000
Martis Creek Lake	Martis Creek Dam	Martis Creek	Nevada	United States Army Corps of Engineers	1972	Earth	113	34	20,400	25,200
McCloud Reservoir	McCloud Dam	McCloud River	Shasta	Pacific Gas and Electric Company	1965	Earth and rock	240	73	35,300	43,500
McKay's Point Reservoir	McKay's Point Diversion Dam	Stanislaus River, North Fork	Calaveras	Calaveras County Water District	1989	Constant radius arch	233	71	2,100	2,600
Millerton Lake	Friant Dam	San Joaquin River	Fresno and Madera	United States Bureau of Reclamation	1942	Gravity	299	91	520,500	642,000
Mittry Lake	Laguna Diversion Dam	Colorado River	Imperial	United States Bureau of Reclamation	1909	Earth and rock	10	3	1,950	2,410
Moccasin Reservoir	Moccasin Dam	Moccasin Creek	Tuolumne	San Francisco Public Utilities Commission	1930	Rock	60	18	554	683
Modesto Reservoir	Modesto Reservoir Dam	Tuolumne River tributary	Stanislaus	Modesto Irrigation District	1911	Earth	36	9	29,000	36,000
Mojave River Forks Reservoir	Mojave Forks Dam	Mojave River, West Fork	San Bernardino	United States Army Corps of Engineers	1971	Earth	204	62	89,700	110,600
Moon Lake	Tule Lake Dam	Cedar Creek	Lassen	John Hancock Mutual Insurance Company	1904	Earth	16	5	39,500	48,700
Morena Reservoir	Morena Dam	Cottonwood Creek	San Diego	City of San Diego	1912	Rock-fill	181	55	50,206	61,929
Morris Reservoir	Morris Dam	San Gabriel River	Los Angeles	Los Angeles County Department of Public Works	1935	Gravity	245	75	27,500	33,900
Mountain Meadows Reservoir	Indian Ole Dam	Hamilton Creek	Lassen	Pacific Gas and Electric Company	1929	Flashboard and buttress	26	8	24,800	30,600
New Bullards Bar Reservoir	New Bullards Bar Dam	Yuba River, North Fork	Yuba	Yuba County Water Agency	1970	Variable radius arch	635	194	969,600	1,196,000
New Hogan Lake	New Hogan Dam	Calaveras River	Calaveras	United States Army Corps of Engineers	1963	Earth	210	64	317,000	391,000
New Lake	New Lake Dam	Little Bear Creek	San Bernardino	San Bernardino County	1976	Earth	225	69	1,970	2,430
New Melones Lake	New Melones Dam	Stanislaus River	Calaveras	United States Bureau of Reclamation	1979	Rock-fill	578	176	2,400,000	2,960,000
New Spicer Meadow Reservoir	New Spicer Meadow Dam	Highland Creek	Tuolumne and Alpine	Calaveras County Water District	1989	Rock-fill	262	80	189,000	233,000
Nicasio Reservoir	Seeger Dam	Nicasio Creek	Marin	Marin Municipal Water District	1961	Earth	115	35	22,400	27,600
Olivenhain Reservoir	Olivenhain Dam	Escondido Creek tributary	San Diego	San Diego County Water Authority	2003	Gravity	309	94	24,900	30,700
O'Neill Forebay	O'Neill Dam	San Luis Creek	Merced	United States Bureau of Reclamation	1967	Earth	64	20	56,400	69,600
Pacheco Reservoir	North Fork Dam	North Fork Pacheco Creek	Santa Clara	Pacheco Pass Water District	1939	Earth	100	30	6,150	7,590
Pacoima Reservoir	Pacoima Dam	Pacoima Creek	Los Angeles	Los Angeles County Department of Public Works	1929	Variable radius arch	365	111	3,777	4,659
Palm Canyon Dam Reservoir	Palm Canyon Dam		Riverside	Santa Rosa Band of Cahuilla Indians						
none (Palo Verde Valley Irrigation District)	Palo Verde Diversion Dam	Colorado River	Riverside	United States Bureau of Reclamation	1957	Earth and rock	46	14	?	?
Pardee Reservoir	Pardee Dam	Mokelumne River	Amador and Calaveras	East Bay Municipal Utility District	1929	Gravity	345	105	179,950	221,960
Pilarcitos Reservoir	Pilarcitos Dam	Pilarcitos Creek	San Mateo	San Francisco Public Utilities Commission	1864					
Pine Flat Lake	Pine Flat Dam	Kings River	Fresno	United States Army Corps of Engineers	1954	Gravity	440	134	1,000,000	1,230,000
Pinecrest Lake	Main Strawberry Dam	Stanislaus River, South Fork	Tuolumne	Pacific Gas and Electric Company	1916	Rock-fill	143	44	18,312	22,588
Pit Six Reservoir	Pit 6 Dam	Pit River	Shasta	Pacific Gas and Electric Company	1965	Gravity	172	52	15,700	19,400
Pit 7 Reservoir	Pit 7 Dam	Pit River	Shasta	Pacific Gas and Electric Company	1965	Gravity	230	70	34,000	42,000
Poe Reservoir	Poe Dam	North Fork Feather River	Butte	Pacific Gas and Electric Company	1959	Diversion	62	19	1,150	1,418
Prado Reservoir	Prado Dam	Santa Ana River	Riverside and San Bernardino	United States Army Corps of Engineers	1941	Rock-fill	106	32	314,400	387,800
Prosser Creek Reservoir	Prosser Creek Dam	Prosser Creek	Nevada	United States Bureau of Reclamation	1962	Earth	133	41	29,800	36,800
Puddingstone Reservoir	Puddingstone Dam	Walnut Creek	Los Angeles	Los Angeles County Department of Public Works	1928	Earth	147	45	16,342	20,158
Pyramid Lake	Pyramid Dam	Piru Creek	Los Angeles	California Department of Water Resources	1973	Earth and rock	386	118	180,000	222,000
Redinger Lake	Big Creek 7 Dam	San Joaquin River	Fresno	Southern California Edison	1951	Gravity	233	71	35,000	43,000
Rollins Reservoir	Rollins Dam	Bear River	Nevada	Nevada Irrigation District	1965	Earth and rock	242	74	66,000	81,000
Rowena Reservoir	Rowena Reservoir Dam	off-stream reservoir	Los Angeles	Los Angeles Department of Water and Power	1901	Earth	?	?	30	39
Ruth Reservoir	Robert W. Matthews Dam	Mad River	Trinity	Humboldt Bay Municipal Water District	1962	Earth	150	46	51,800	63,900
Salt Spring Valley Reservoir	Salt Springs Valley Dam	Rock Creek	Calaveras	Rock Creek Water District	1882	Earth	47	14	10,900	13,400
Salt Springs Reservoir	Salt Springs Dam	Mokelumne River, North Fork	Amador and Calaveras	Pacific Gas and Electric Company	1931	Rock-fill	332	101	141,900	175,000
San Andreas Lake	San Andreas Dam	San Mateo Creek tributary	San Mateo	City and County of San Francisco	1870	Earth	107	33	19,027	23,470
San Antonio Reservoir	James H. Turner Dam	San Antonio Creek	Alameda	City and County of San Francisco	1964	Earth	193	59	50,500	62,300
San Antonio Reservoir	San Antonio Dam	San Antonio Creek	San Bernardino	United States Army Corps of Engineers	1956	Earth	160	49	7,582	9,352
San Gabriel Reservoir	San Gabriel Dam No. 1	San Gabriel River	Los Angeles	Los Angeles County Department of Public Works	1938	Earth and rock	320	98	44,183	54,499
San Joaquin Reservoir	San Joaquin Reservoir Dam	Bonita Creek tributary	Orange	Irvine Ranch Water District	1966	Earth	224	68	3,036	3,745
San Luis Reservoir	B.F. Sisk Dam (AKA San Luis Dam)	San Luis Creek	Merced	United States Bureau of Reclamation	1967	Earth	305	93	2,041,000	2,518,000
San Pablo Reservoir	San Pablo Dam	San Pablo Creek	Contra Costa	East Bay Municipal Utility District	1920	Earth	170	52	43,193	53,278
San Vicente Reservoir	San Vicente Dam	San Vicente Creek	San Diego	City of San Diego	1943	Gravity	203	62	242,000	298,500
Santa Anita Reservoir	Big Santa Anita Dam	Rio Hondo tributary	Los Angeles	Los Angeles County Department of Public Works	1927	Variable radius arch	225	69	858	1,058
Santa Fe Reservoir	Santa Fe Dam	San Gabriel River	Los Angeles	United States Army Corps of Engineers	1947	Earth	92	28	30,887	38,098
Santa Margarita Lake	Salinas Dam	Salinas River	San Luis Obispo	United States Army Corps of Engineers	1942	Variable radius arch	135	41	26,000	32,000
Santa Rosa Creek Reservoir	Santa Rosa Creek Dam	Santa Rosa Creek tributary	Sonoma	Sonoma County Water Agency	1963	Earth	37	11	3,550	4,379
Scotts Flat Reservoir	Scotts Flat Dam	Deer Creek	Nevada County	Nevada Irrigation District	1948	Earth	175	53	49,000	60,000
Searsville Lake	Searsville Dam	Corte Madera Creek	San Mateo County	Stanford University	1890	Gravity	68	21	952	1,170
Sepulveda Flood Control Basin	Sepulveda Dam	Los Angeles River	Los Angeles	United States Army Corps of Engineers	1941	Earth	57	17	17,425	21,493
Seven Oaks Reservoir	Seven Oaks Dam	Santa Ana River	San Bernardino	United States Army Corps of Engineers	1999	Rock-fill	550	168	145,600	179,600
Shasta Lake	Shasta Dam	Sacramento River	Shasta	United States Bureau of Reclamation	1945	Gravity	521	159	4,552,200	5,615,000
Shaver Lake	Shaver Lake Dam	Stevenson Creek	Fresno	Southern California Edison	1927	Gravity	180	55	135,283	166,869
?	Sierra Madre Dam	Santa Anita Creek	Los Angeles	Los Angeles County Department of Public Works	1928	Constant radius arch	69	21	51	63
Silver Lake Reservoir	Silver Lake Reservoir Dam	off-stream reservoir	Los Angeles	Los Angeles Department of Water and Power	1907	Earth	?	?	2,400	3,000
Silverwood Lake	Cedar Springs Dam	Mojave River, West Fork	San Bernardino	California Department of Water Resources	1971	Earth and rock	236	72	73,000	90,050
Skinner Reservoir	Skinner Clearwell Dam	off-stream reservoir	Riverside	Metropolitan Water District of Southern California	1973/1991	Earth	44	13	44,200	54,400
Slab Creek Reservoir	Slab Creek Dam	American River, South Fork	El Dorado	Sacramento Municipal Utility District	1967	Variable radius arch	233	71	16,600	20,500
Sly Creek Reservoir	Sly Creek Dam	Lost Creek	Butte	Oroville-Wyandotte Irrigation District	1961	Earth	271	83	65,050	80,240
Spring Creek Reservoir	Spring Creek Dam	Spring Creek	Shasta	United States Bureau of Reclamation	1963	Earth	184	56	5,874	7,246
Stampede Reservoir	Stampede Dam	Little Truckee River	Sierra	United States Bureau of Reclamation	1970	Earth	226	69	226,500	279,400
Stevens Creek Reservoir	Stevens Creek Dam	Stevens Creek	Santa Clara	Santa Clara Valley Water District	1935	Earth	129	39	3,452	4,258
Stony Gorge Reservoir	Stony Gorge Dam	Stony Creek	Glenn	United States Bureau of Reclamation	1928	Gravity	119	36	50,350	62,100
Sugar Pine Reservoir	Sugar Pine Dam	North Shirttail Creek	Placer	Foresthill Public Utility District	1981	Earth	251	77	6,916	8,531
Sulphur Creek Reservoir	Sulphur Creek Dam	Sulphur Creek	Orange	Orange County	1966	Earth	42	13	520	641
Sweetwater Reservoir	Sweetwater Dam	Sweetwater River	San Diego	Sweetwater Authority	1888	Gravity-arch type	108	88	28,079	34,635
Thermalito Afterbay	Thermalito Afterbay Dam	Feather River tributary	Butte	California Department of Water Resources	1967	Earth	38	12	57,041	70,359
Tinemaha Reservoir	Tinemaha Dam	Owens River	Inyo	City of Los Angeles	1928	Earth	32	10	16,405	20,235
Topaz Lake (Note: The lake is only partially in California, as it sits astride the border between California and Nevada.)	Topaz Dam	West Walker River	Mono	Walker River Irrigation District	1922	Earth	122	37	126,000	155,000
Trinity Lake	Trinity Dam	Trinity River	Trinity	United States Bureau of Reclamation	1962	Earth	457	139	2,447,650	3,019,130
Tulloch Reservoir	Tulloch Dam	Stanislaus River	Calaveras	Oakdale & South San Joaquin Irrigation Districts	1958	Gravity	205	62	68,400	84,400
Turlock Lake	Turlock Lake Dam	Tuolumne River tributary	Stanislaus	Turlock Irrigation District	1915	Hydraulic fill	36	9	45,600	56,200
Twain Harte Lake	Twain Harte Dam	Sullivan Creek	Tuolumne	Twain Harte Lake Association	1928	Multiple arch dam	36	11	143	176
Twitchell Reservoir	Twitchell Dam	Cuyama River	San Luis Obispo	United States Bureau of Reclamation	1958	Earth	211	64	240,000	296,035
Union Valley Reservoir	Union Valley Dam	Silver Creek (American River tributary)	El Dorado	Sacramento Municipal Utility District	1963	Earth and rock	453	138	230,000	284,000
Upper San Leandro Reservoir	San Leandro Dam	San Leandro Creek	Alameda & Contra Costa	East Bay Municipal Utility District	1926/1977	Earth	182	55	42,000	52,000
?	Jamestown Mines Tailings Dam	Woods Creek tributary	Tuolumne	Tuolumne County	1994	Rock-fill	200	61	12,100	14,900
Uvas Reservoir	Uvas Dam	Uvas Creek	Santa Clara	Santa Clara Valley Water District	1957	Earth and rock	105	32	9,935	12,255
Vail Lake	Vail Dam	Temecula Creek	Riverside	Rancho California Water District	1949	Variable radius arch	152	46	50,000	61,500
Vasona Reservoir	Vasona Dam	Los Gatos Creek	Santa Clara	Santa Clara Valley Water District	1935	Earth and rock	34	10	495	611
?	Villa Park Dam	Santiago Creek	Orange	Orange County	1963	Earth	118	36	15,600	19,200
West Valley Reservoir	West Valley Dam	West Valley Creek	Modoc	South Fork Irrigation District	1936	Earth and rock	65	20	23,000	28,000
Whale Rock Reservoir	Whale Rock Dam	Old Creek	San Luis Obispo	Whale Rock Commission	1960	Earth	193	59	40,662	50,156
Whiskeytown Lake	Whiskeytown Dam	Clear Creek	Shasta	United States Bureau of Reclamation	1963	Earth	263	80	241,100	297,400
Whittier Narrows Reservoir	Whittier Narrows Dam	San Gabriel River	Los Angeles	United States Army Corps of Engineers	1957	Earth	56	17	67,060	82,720
Woodward Reservoir	Woodward Dam	Simmons Creek	Stanislaus	South San Joaquin Irrigation District	1918	Hydraulic fill	65	20	35,000	43,000

Please add to this list from the below sources.

== Former dams ==
- Baldwin Hills Reservoir (1947–1963) - failed December 14, 1963
- St. Francis Dam (1926–1928) - failed March 12, 1928
- San Clemente Dam - intentionally removed in 2015-2016 because of environmental issues
- Van Norman Dams (1911–1971) - failed February 9, 1971, in 1971 San Fernando earthquake

== Proposed dams ==
- Ah Pah Dam (defunct)
- Auburn Dam (defunct)
- Centennial Dam
- Sites Reservoir
- Temperance Flat Dam

== See also ==
- California State Water Project
- List of dam removals in California
- List of lakes in California
- List of largest reservoirs of California
- List of power stations in California
- List of the tallest dams in the United States
- List of United States Bureau of Reclamation dams
- Water in California

== Notes and references ==
=== References ===
- Department of Water Resources Division of Safety of Dams (2009). "Listing of Dams". California Data Exchange Center. State of California. Archived from the original on April 11, 2009.
