= Iron Canyon Dam =

- Interactive map of Iron Canyon Dam
- Country: United States
- Location: Shasta County, California
- Coordinates: 41°02′30″N 121°59′06″W
- Purpose: Power
- Opening date: 1965; 61 years ago
- Operator: Pacific Gas and Electric Company

Dam and spillways
- Type of dam: Earth fill dam
- Height: 214 ft (65 m)
- Length: 1,038 ft (316 m)

Reservoir
- Creates: Iron Canyon Reservoir
- Total capacity: 24,300 acre⋅ft (30,000,000 m^{3})
- Surface area: 510 acres (210 ha)

Iron Canyon Dam (National ID # CA00417) is a dam in Shasta County, California, United States.

The earthen rockfill dam was constructed in 1965 by the Pacific Gas and Electric Company for hydroelectric power, with a height of 214 feet (65 m) and a length of 1,038 feet (316 m) at its crest. It impounds Iron Canyon Creek. The dam is owned and operated by PG&E. The downstream James Black Powerhouse, one of the largest in the company's system, produces 208,000 mechanical horsepower.

== Iron Canyon Reservoir ==
The reservoir the dam creates, Iron Canyon Reservoir, is surrounded by the Shasta-Trinity National Forest. It has a water surface of 510 acres (210 ha), a shoreline of approximately 15 miles (24 km), and has a capacity of 24,300 acre-feet (30,000,000 m^{3}). Recreation includes fishing (for trout), hunting, camping, p and hiking.

Water is diverted from the McCloud River at Lake McCloud about 20 miles (32 km) south of Mount Shasta, through a tunnel to Iron Canyon Reservoir, and then through another tunnel to the James B. Black Powerhouse, which outlets into the Pit River on the upper end of Pit Six Reservoir.

== See also ==
- Dams in California
- Reservoirs in Shasta County, California
- List of dams and reservoirs in California
