= Calero Dam =

Calero Dam is the name of several dams:

- Calero Dam (Sacramento County, California) on Crevis Creek near Rancho Cordova
- Calero Dam (Santa Clara County, California) on Calero Creek near San Jose
