= Bear Gulch Reservoir =

Reservoir in Woodside, California, U.S.

- Location in California Location in United States
- Location: Woodside, California
- Coordinates: 37°25′57″N 122°13′34″W
- Type: Reservoir
- Basin countries: United States
- Average depth: 100 ft (30 m)
- Max. depth: 295 ft (90 m)
- Surface elevation: 203 ft (62 m)

Bear Gulch Reservoir is a reservoir in the town of Woodside, California. It is the main storage for the Bear Gulch District of the California Water Service, holding up to 215 million US gallons (810,000 m^{3}) of water, and serving 55,501 people. It is fed by water diverted by two dams on nearby Bear Creek.

As a drinking water reservoir, it is not open to the public, except for horseback riding as its trails are only used for cars from the California water service and horses.

Mountain lion and Bobcats are occasionally sighted in the area of the reservoir. The area of Bear Gulch Creek was named after an 1850 incident when a man hauling logs was mauled by a grizzly bear with cubs.

If the reservoir dam fails, portions of Woodside and unincorporated West Menlo Park may be subject to inundation.

This reservoir should not be confused with another one of the same name within Pinnacles National Park.

== See also ==
- List of dams and reservoirs in California
- List of lakes in California
- List of lakes in the San Francisco Bay Area
