= Collins Lake =

Man-made lake in California, United States

- Virginia Ranch Reservoir
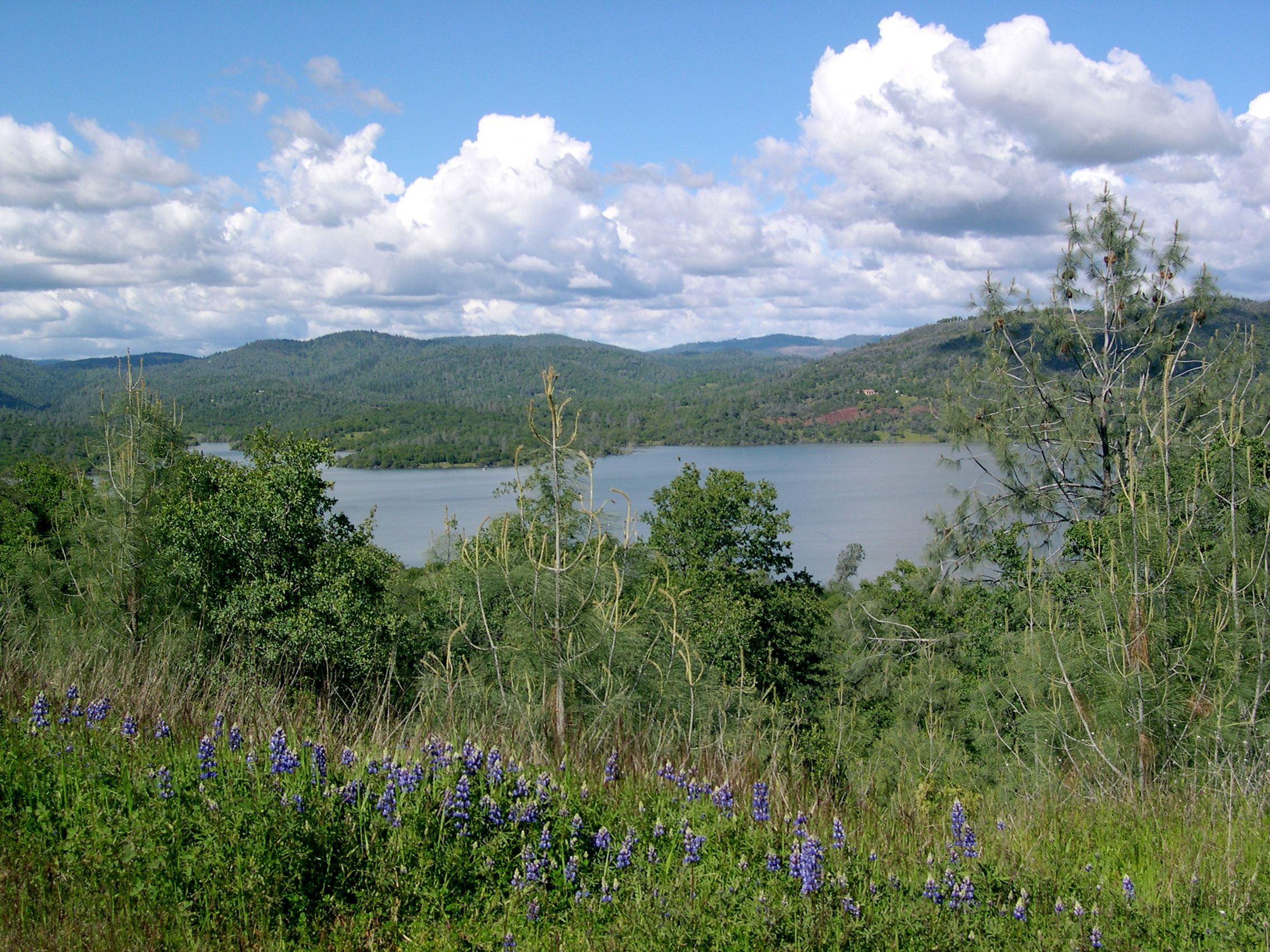
- View from the Hillside

- Location within California Location within the United States
- Location: Yuba County, California, United States
- Coordinates: 39°20′15.44″N 121°19′37.64″W
- Lake type: Reservoir
- Primary inflows: Dry Creek, runoff
- Primary outflows: Dry Creek, irrigation
- Basin countries: United States
- Max. length: 4.60 km (2.86 mi)
- Max. width: 1.85 km (1.15 mi)
- Surface area: 4.05 km^{2} (1.56 sq mi)
- Max. depth: 40.6 m (133 ft)
- Water volume: 57,000 acre⋅ft (70,000,000 m^{3})
- Surface elevation: 361 m (1,184 ft)
- Website: https://collinslake.com/

Collins Lake, impounded by Virginia Ranch Dam, is a freshwater man-made lake with 1,009 acres (4.08 km^{2}) located in the foothills of the Sierra Nevada Mountains north of Sacramento, California. The lake was originally created to provide additional irrigation water to Browns Valley and Loma Rica. It still serves that purpose as well as a recreation and fishing lake.

== History ==
Collins Lake's founding organization, Browns Valley Irrigation District (BVID), was established in 1888. Demand for irrigation water in the area quickly exceeded availability. As early as 1919 BVID began exploring the idea of damming the water flowing through Virginia Ranch in order to satisfy Browns Valley and Loma Rica. In 1950 a permit was issued for a 105-foot (32 m) high dam which would have created a 35,000 acre-feet (43,000,000 m^{3}) reservoir. Lack of funds for the five year, 1.36 million dollar project prevented it from being started. Ten years later a 4.8 million dollar loan was approved for a 152-foot (46 m) high embankment dam which would create a lake with 57,000 acre-feet (70,000,000 m^{3}) of capacity. Virginia Ranch Dam was completed in 3 years, creating Collins Lake, named for Merle Collins who played a significant role in promoting the project.

In 1967 Pineland Development started a concession for recreation and camping on the lakefront. Since 1972 the concession has been family run and has expanded to include 109 RV hookup campsites as well as tent camping sites. The campground and day use areas are gated but open at dawn year round.

== See also ==
- List of dams and reservoirs in California
- List of lakes in California
