= Camp Far West Reservoir =

- Camp Far West Lake
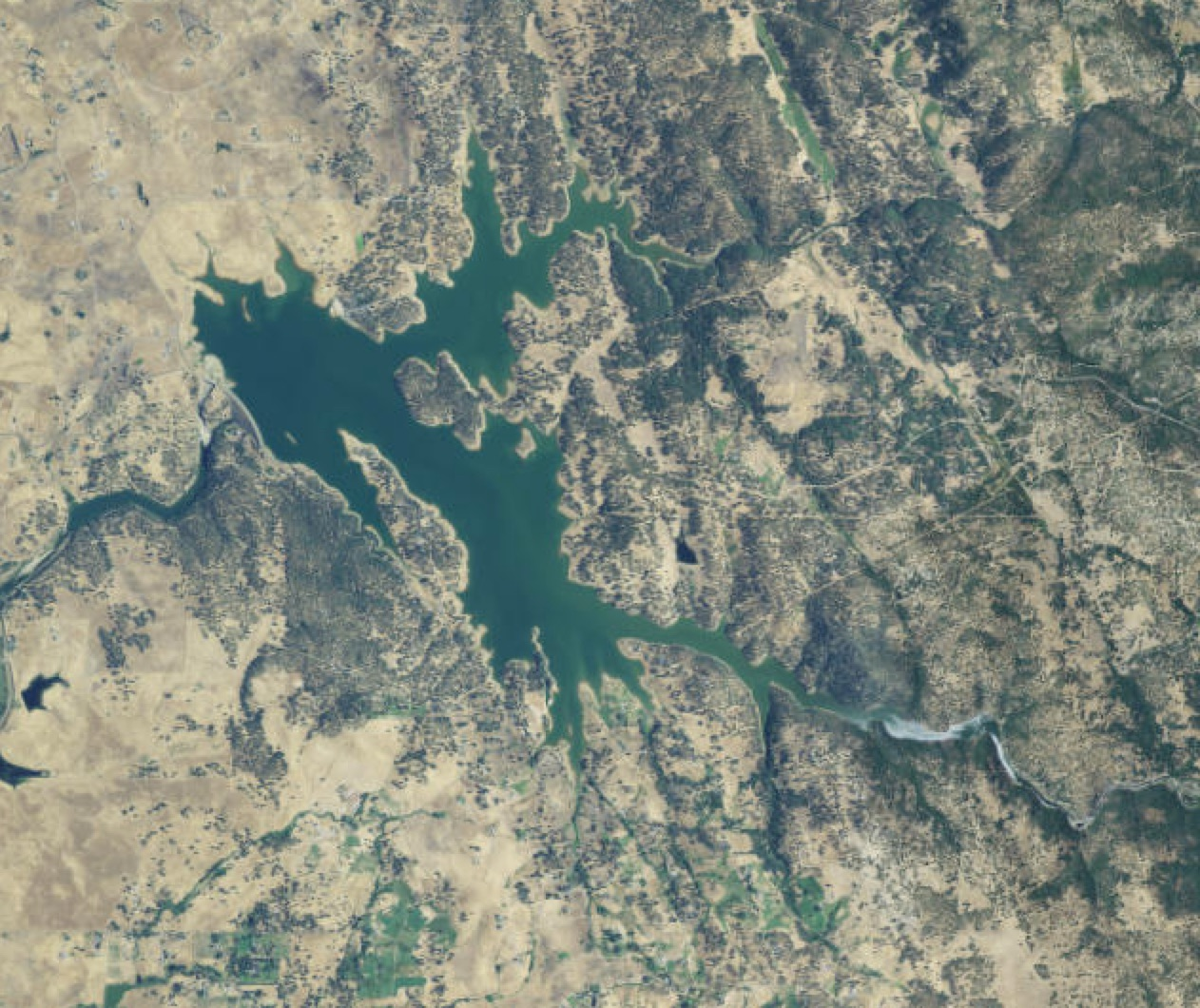
- Aerial view

- Location within California Location within the United States
- Location: Nevada, Yuba, and Placer County, California
- Coordinates: 39°03′N 121°19′W
- Type: Reservoir
- Built: 1963; 63 years ago

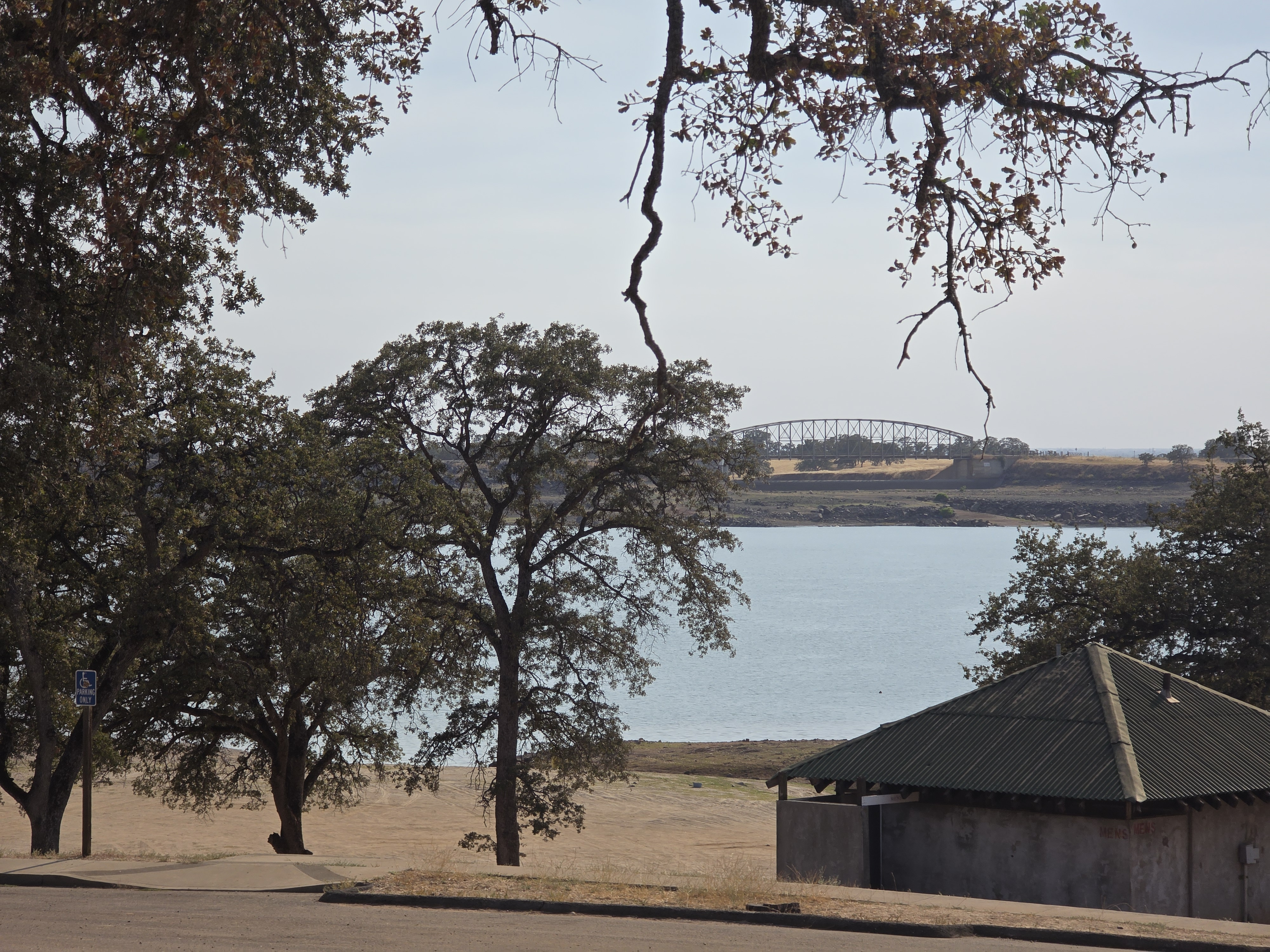
Camp Far West Reservoir

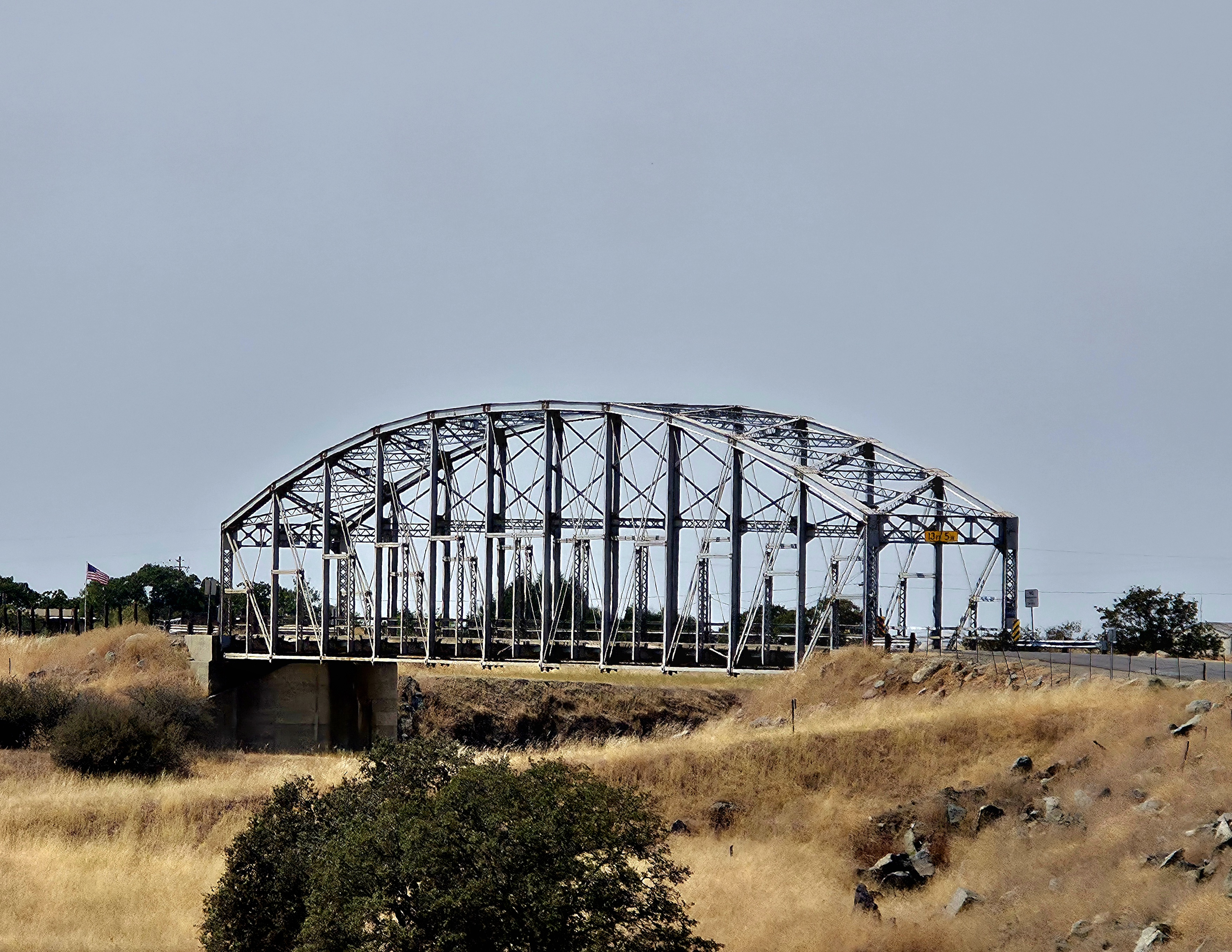
Camp Far West Bridge

Camp Far West Reservoir (also known as Camp Far West Lake) is a small reservoir in the foothills of Northern California located approximately eight miles (13 km) east of Wheatland, California and 45 miles (72 km) northeast of Sacramento. The lake forms the meeting point of three California counties, Placer, Nevada and Yuba. The lake was formed by the Bear River and Rock Creek, near what was formerly the confluence of the two streams. The dam was constructed in 1963 as part of the California State Water Project to control flooding in the Central Valley (California), and to provide hydroelectric power to the surrounding area.

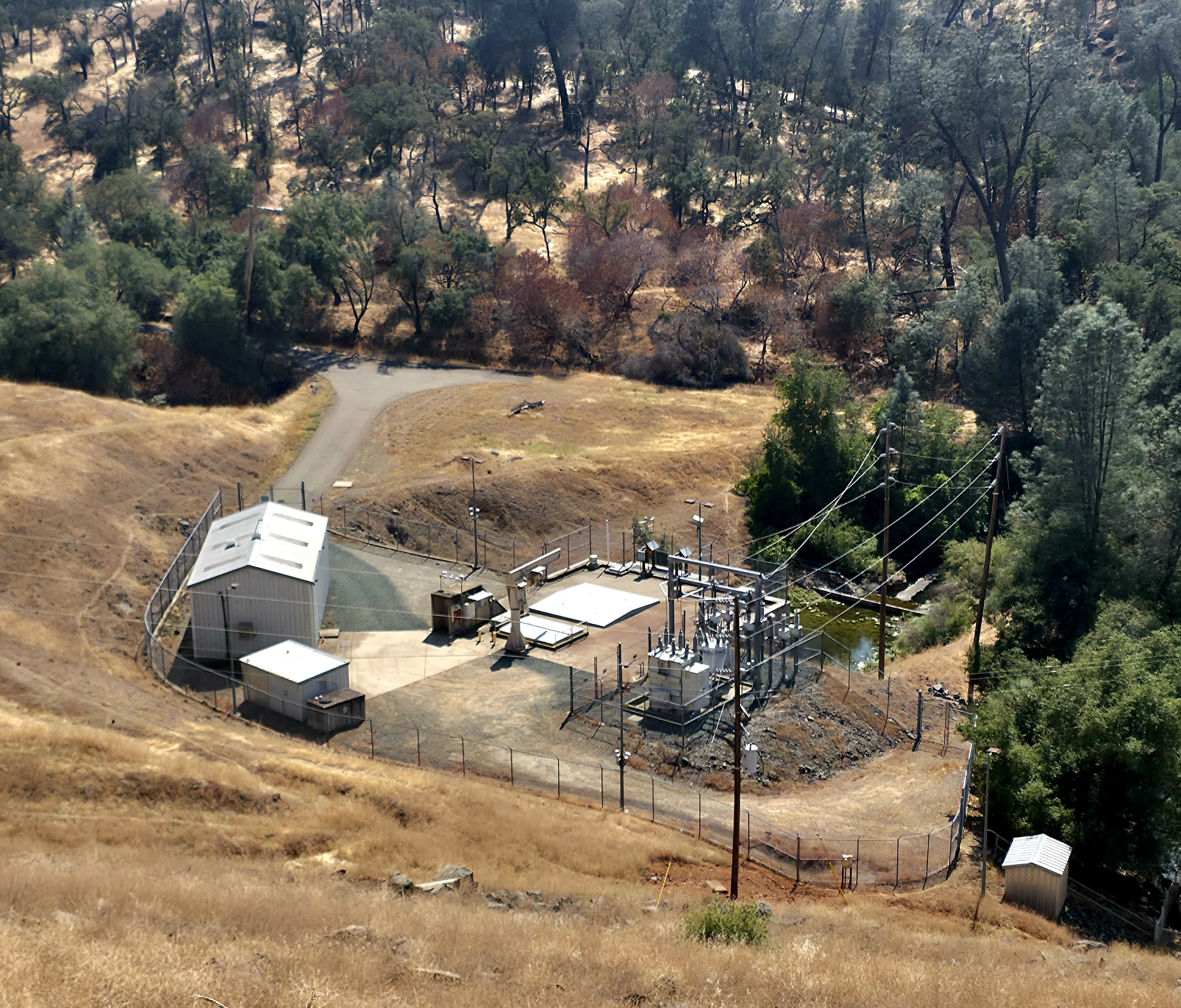
Camp Far West power station

The facility is owned and operated by the South Sutter Water District.

== Recreation and trails ==
Numerous trails exist around the lake. Dirt roads and trails surround the lake and are typically accessible year round. Free range cattle are common in the area both on the dirt trails and in the campground areas around the lake.

The California Office of Environmental Health Hazard Assessment released an advisory statement regarding eating fish caught from this reservoir based on the mercury level.

== See also ==
- List of dams and reservoirs in California
- List of lakes in California
