= San Antonio Reservoir =

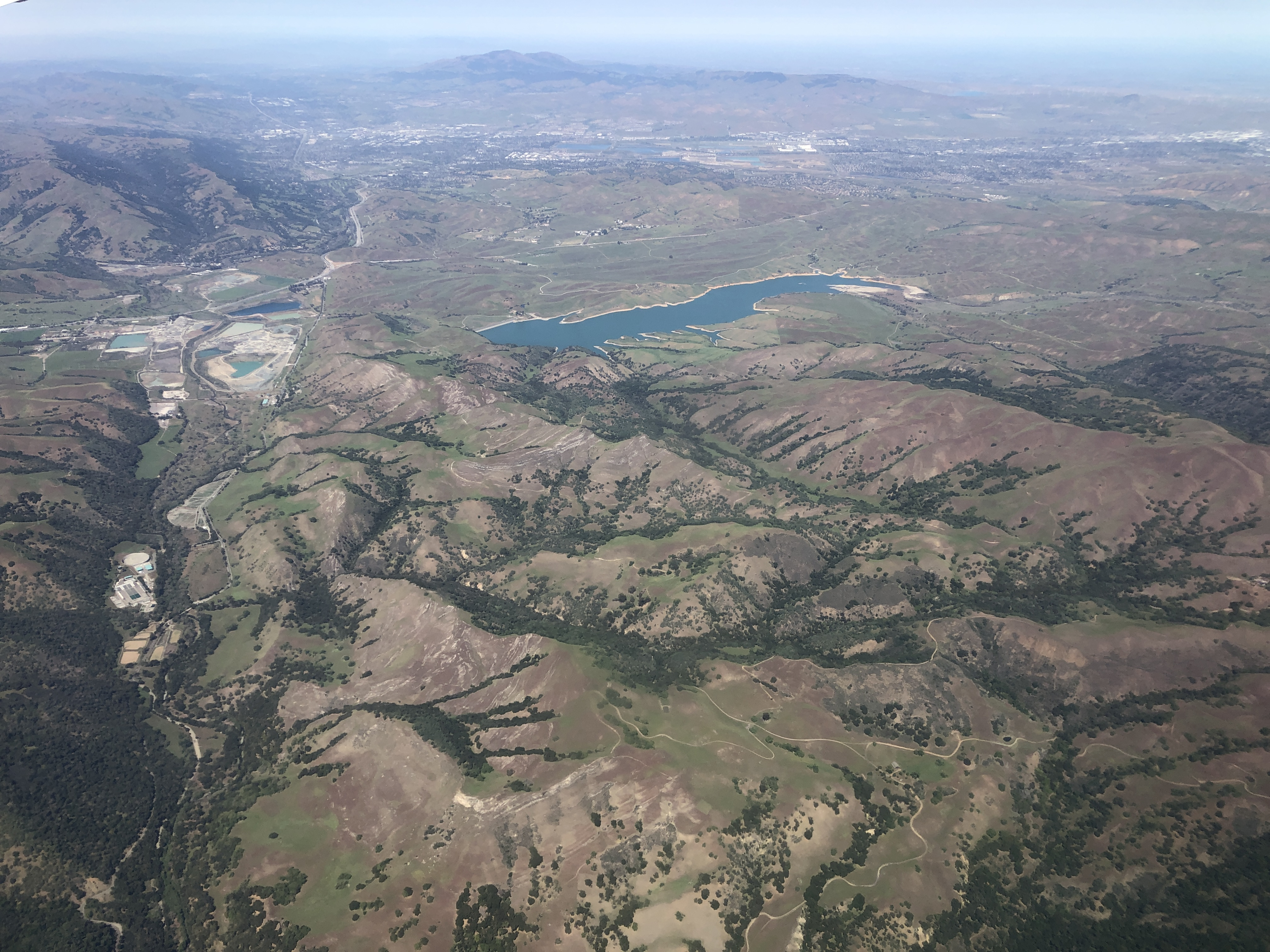
- Aerial view of San Antonio Reservoir

- Location within California Location within the United States
- Location: Alameda County, California
- Coordinates: 37.58118°N 121.82825°W
- Type: Reservoir
- Primary inflows: San Antonio Creek
- Primary outflows: San Antonio Creek
- Basin countries: United States

San Antonio Reservoir is located in Alameda County, California, about three miles east-southeast of Sunol. It was built in 1964 (62 years ago) by the City and County of San Francisco. Formed by the James H. Turner Dam across San Antonio Creek not far above where it flows into Alameda Creek, its purpose is to store water from the Hetch Hetchy Aqueduct and local wells and watersheds.

== History ==
San Antonio Creek and Reservoir are in the La Costa Valley, misnamed for French settler Juan F. La Coste, who raised livestock in the valley in the 1850's. San Antonio Creek was named in 1853 but renamed in 1873 as La Costa Creek for some time. Today it is officially San Antonio Creek again, with La Costa Creek joining San Antonio Creek above the reservoir, making the beginning of the La Costa Valley, which ends at Calaveras Road.

== Watershed ==
The reservoir is fed by a 40 square miles (100 km^{2}) watershed. Its spillway is at 468 feet (143 m) with a design discharge of 13,500 cfs. The reservoir's capacity is 50,500 acre-feet (62,300,000 m^{3}). Its two main tributaries are San Antonio Creek and Indian Creek.

== Ecology ==
San Antonio Reservoir (SFWD) blocks salmonid access to most of the San Antonio Creek watershed and the reservoir does not provide downstream releases. Tributaries to the reservoir flow intermittently in winter and likely provided little habitat to anadromous steelhead trout (Oncorhynchus mykiss).

Tule elk (Cervis canadensis nannodes), California's only endemic elk subspecies, recolonized the lands about San Antonio Reservoir after being translocated by the California Department of Fish and Wildlife to Mount Hamilton's San Felipe Ranch owned by Bill Hewlett and David Packard in 1978.

== Recreation ==
The reservoir is not open to the public.

== See also ==
- List of dams and reservoirs in California
- List of lakes of California
