= Balsam Forebay =

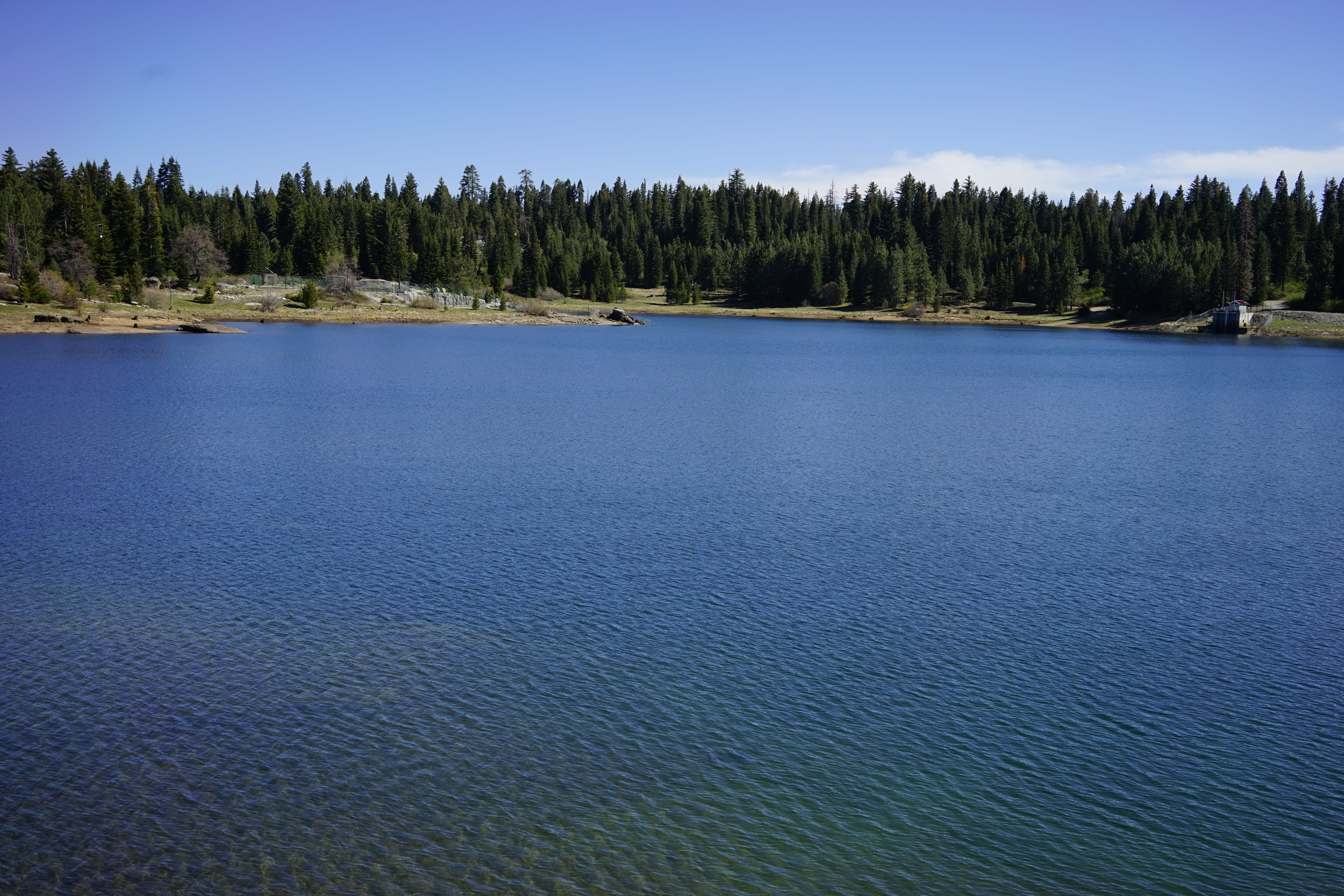

- Location within California
- Location: Sierra National Forest, Fresno County, California
- Coordinates: 37.16111°N 119.25265°W
- Type: Artificial lake
- Basin countries: United States
- Built: 1986; 40 years ago

Balsam Forebay is an artificial lake in the Sierra National Forest of Fresno County, California near California State Route 168 approximately 5 km (3.1 miles) north east of Shaver Lake. A trail provides public access to and around the forebay with access to from the southeast shore. Road access to limited to official vehicles. The area is popular for hiking, swimming, and a picnicking.

== Balsam Meadow Dam ==
The lake is formed by the Balsam Meadow Dam, a rockfill dam completed in 1986. The dam is 1,325 feet (404 m) long and 127 feet (39 m) high, with 4.1 feet (1.2 m) of freeboard. Southern California Edison owns the dam.

== See also ==
- List of lakes in California
- List of dams and reservoirs in California
