= Olivenhain Dam =

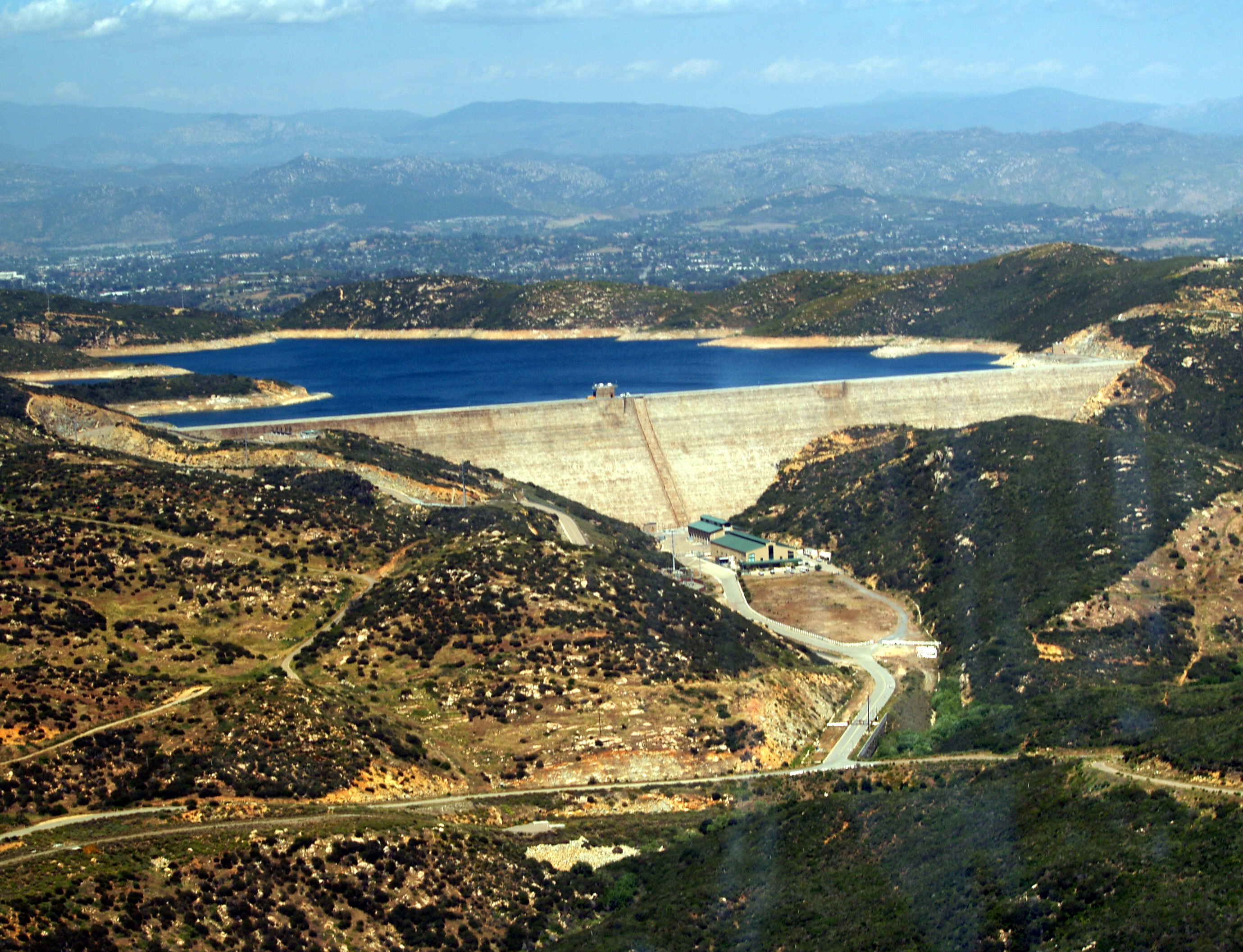
- Olivenhain Dam and reservoir in 2011 as seen from a helicopter

- Location within California
- Location: Escondido, California
- Coordinates: 33°04′12″N 117°08′18″W
- Status: In use
- Construction began: 1998; 28 years ago
- Opening date: 2003; 23 years ago
- Construction cost: $203 Million USD
- Owners: San Diego County Water Authority and Olivenhain Municipal Water District

Dam and spillways
- Type of dam: Gravity
- Impounds: None
- Height: 318 ft (97 m)
- Length: 2,400 ft (730 m)
- Dam volume: 1,300,000 m^{3} (46,000,000 ft^{3})

Reservoir
- Creates: Olivenhain Reservoir
- Total capacity: 24,000 acre⋅ft (30,000,000 m^{3})
- Surface area: 200 acres (0.81 km^{2})
- Maximum water depth: 300 ft (91 m)
- Website www.sdcwa.org/projects-programs/facilities/olivenhain-dam-reservoir/

Olivenhain Dam is a gravity dam near Escondido, California, United States. The dam was constructed between 1998 and 2003 as part of San Diego's Emergency Storage Project with the primary purpose of water supply for municipal use. It does not sit on a river or stream but is supplied with water by a system of pumps and pipes. The dam is connected to Lake Hodges and the Second San Diego Aqueduct. It is constructed of roller-compacted concrete and is the first of its type in California.

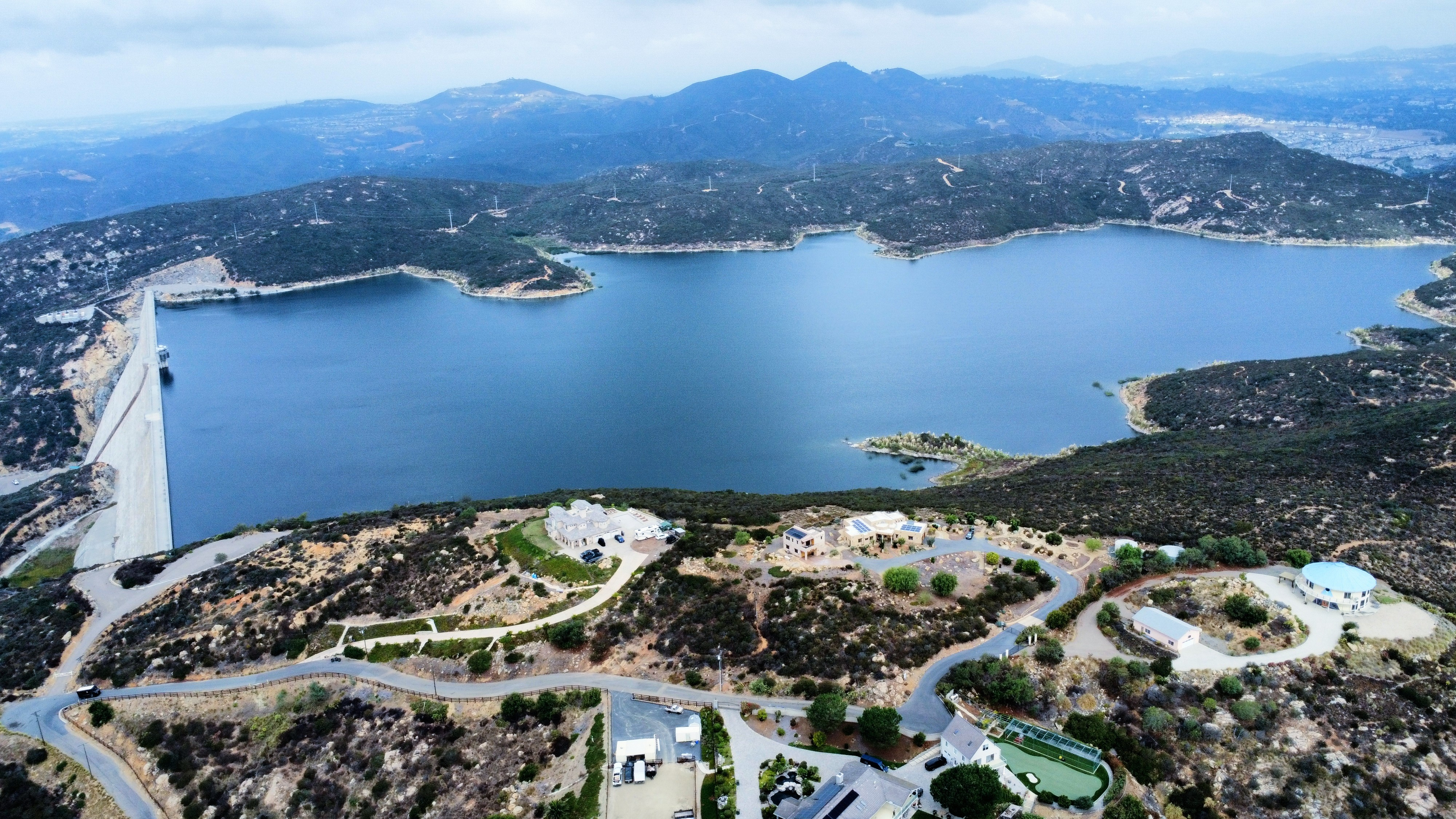
Aerial view of Olivenhain Dam and Reservoir, as seen in October 2024

== Construction ==
Ladd Associates excavated the dam's foundation and removed 700,000 yd^{3} (540,000 m^{3}) of material on an $8.4 million contract. Construction on the actual dam began in 2000 by Kiewit Pacific and in 2001, Morrison Knudsen Corp received a $23 million contract to install the pipeline. Concrete was poured into the dam in 12 ft (3.7 m) lifts and it was "topped off" on October 31, 2002. The entire structure to include the inlet/outlet works, crest roadway and mechanical work was complete in August 2003. A 750 acres (3.0 km^{2}) park was also constructed around the dam and reservoir site.

The dam was designed by JV Parsons Engineering Science Inc and Harza Engineering Co. while being owned by the San Diego County Water Authority and the Olivenhain Municipal Water District. The Olivehain Municipal Water District operates the Elfin Forest Recreational Reserve around the reservoir.

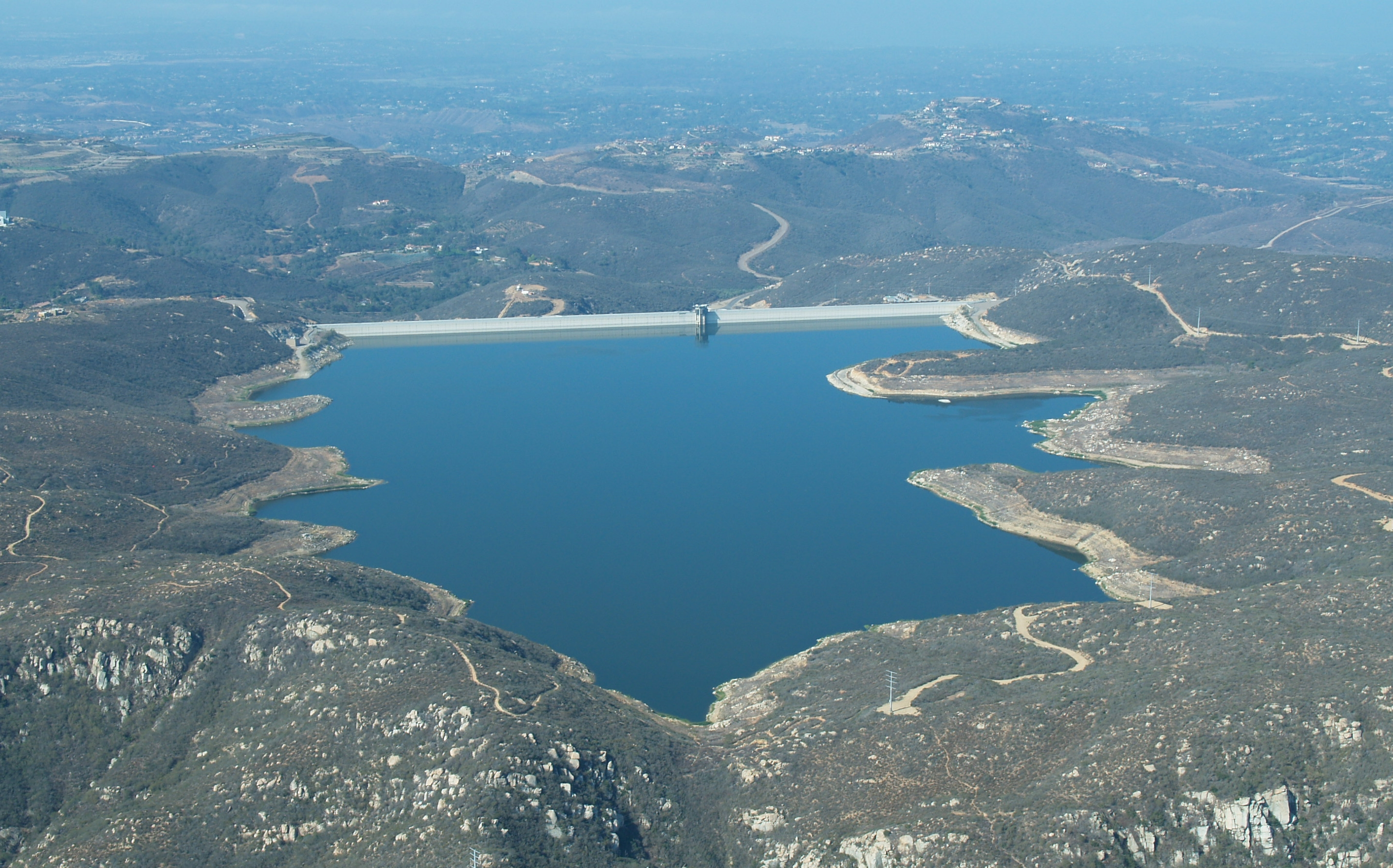
Aerial view of Olivenhain Reservoir and Dam looking toward the southwest

== See also ==
- List of reservoirs and dams in California
- San Vicente Dam
