= Ruth, California =

Ruth
- Unincorporated community Census-designated place
- Position in California.
- Coordinates: 40°17′09″N 123°20′57″W
- Country: United States
- State: California
- County: Trinity

Area
  - Total: 40.543 sq mi (105.006 km^{2})
  - Land: 38.865 sq mi (100.659 km^{2})
  - Water: 1.678 sq mi (4.347 km^{2}) 4.14%
- Elevation: 2,933 ft (894 m)

Population (2020)
  - Total: 254
  - Density: 6.54/sq mi (2.52/km^{2})
- Time zone: UTC-8 (Pacific (PST))
  - Summer (DST): UTC-7 (PDT)
- ZIP Code: 95526
- Area code: 707
- GNIS feature ID: 2628787

Ruth is an unincorporated community in Trinity County, California, United States. Ruth is located in the southern portion of the county. The community and the adjacent Ruth Lake were named after Ruth McKnight, daughter of settlers. It is located near the headwaters of the Mad River and adjacent to the Yolla Bolly-Middle Eel Wilderness. Ruth sits at an elevation of 2,933 feet (894 m). Its population is 254 as of the 2020 census, up from 195 from the 2010 census. For statistical purposes, the United States Census Bureau has defined Ruth as a census-designated place (CDP). The ZIP code is 95526. The community is inside area code 707.

== Geography ==
According to the United States Census Bureau, the CDP covers an area of 40.5 square miles (105.0 km^{2}); 38.9 square miles (100.7 km^{2}) is land and 1.7 square miles (4.3 km^{2}) (4.14%) is water.

== Demographics ==
Historical population
Census	Pop.	Note	%±
2010	195		—
2020	254		30.3%
U.S. Decennial Census; 2010

Ruth first appeared as a census designated place in the 2010 U.S. census.

The 2020 United States census reported that Ruth had a population of 254. The population density was 6.5 inhabitants per square mile (2.5/km^{2}). The racial makeup of Ruth was 211 (83.1%) White, 0 (0.0%) African American, 10 (3.9%) Native American, 5 (2.0%) Asian, 0 (0.0%) Pacific Islander, 13 (5.1%) from other races, and 15 (5.9%) from two or more races. Hispanic or Latino of any race were 8 persons (3.1%).

The census reported that 249 people (98.0% of the population) lived in households, 5 (2.0%) lived in non-institutionalized group quarters, and no one was institutionalized.

There were 116 households, out of which 25 (21.6%) had children under the age of 18 living in them, 46 (39.7%) were married-couple households, 11 (9.5%) were cohabiting couple households, 26 (22.4%) had a female householder with no partner present, and 33 (28.4%) had a male householder with no partner present. 35 households (30.2%) were one person, and 15 (12.9%) were one person aged 65 or older. The average household size was 2.15. There were 68 families (58.6% of all households).

The age distribution was 52 people (20.5%) under the age of 18, 8 people (3.1%) aged 18 to 24, 35 people (13.8%) aged 25 to 44, 58 people (22.8%) aged 45 to 64, and 101 people (39.8%) who were 65 years of age or older. The median age was 61.5 years. For every 100 females, there were 103.2 males.

There were 281 housing units at an average density of 7.2 units per square mile (2.8 units/km^{2}), of which 116 (41.3%) were occupied. Of these, 98 (84.5%) were owner-occupied, and 18 (15.5%) were occupied by renters.

== Politics ==
In the state legislature, Ruth is in the 2nd senatorial district, represented by Democrat Mike McGuire, and the 2nd Assembly district, represented by Democrat Chris Rogers.

Federally, Ruth is in California's 2nd congressional district, represented by Democrat Jared Huffman.
