= Big Sage Reservoir =

- Location within California Location within the United States
- Location: Modoc County, California
- Coordinates: 41°36′15″N 120°39′05″W
- Type: reservoir
- Primary outflows: Rattlesnake Creek
- Catchment area: 107 square miles (280 km^{2})
- Basin countries: United States
- Max. length: 5 miles (8.0 km)
- Max. width: 4 miles (6.4 km)
- Surface area: 5,270 acres (2,130 ha)
- Water volume: 77,000 acre-feet (95,000,000 m^{3})
- Surface elevation: 4,898 feet (1,493 m)

Big Sage Reservoir is an artificial lake in Modoc County, California and Modoc National Forest. Its waters are impounded by Big Sage Dam, which was completed in 1921 (105 years ago).

== Hydrology ==
The lake discharges into Rattlesnake Creek, a tributary of the Pit River.

== Big Sage Dam ==
Big Sage Dam is an earthen dam 680 feet (210 m) long and 49 feet (15 m) high, with 8.3 feet (2.5 m) of freeboard. Hot Springs Valley Irrigation District owns the dam.

== Recreation ==
Facilities include a campground and boat ramp, both located just north of the dam.

== See also ==
- List of lakes in California
- List of dams and reservoirs in California
