= Twain Harte Dam =

- Location within California Location within the United States
- Coordinates: 38°1′43.04″N 120°14′37.44″W
- Construction began: 1927; 99 years ago
- Opening date: 1928; 98 years ago

Twain Harte Dam (National ID # CA00649) is a multiple arch dam in Tuolumne County, California. Its reservoir is Twain Harte Lake and it is located near Twain Harte, California.

Developers began building Twain Harte Dam in the summer of 1927. It was completed in 1928 and is owned by the Twain Harte Lake Association. The dam is 36 feet (11 m) high, 325 feet (99 m) in length, and 8 feet (2.4 m) in width. The dam has a crest elevation of 3,509.8 feet (1,069.8 m) and its volume is 1,197 cubic yards (915 m^{3}).

In August 2014, fracturing of a granite dome known as "the Rock" located adjacent to the dam forced the closing and draining of the lake for safety reasons. It was feared the dam would fail and there would be a flash flood in Sullivan Creek. The cause of this fracturing is a process known as exfoliation.

Twain Harte Lake is the name of the reservoir created by Twain Harte Dam. It has a normal water surface of 12 acres (4.9 ha), and a maximum capacity of 143 acre-feet (176,000 m^{3}). Its drainage area is 1.04 square miles (2.7 km^{2}). The lake is used for recreation and is available only to members of the Twain Harte Lake Association.

== See also ==
- List of dams and reservoirs in California
- List of lakes in California
