= Ruth Reservoir =

Reservoir in California

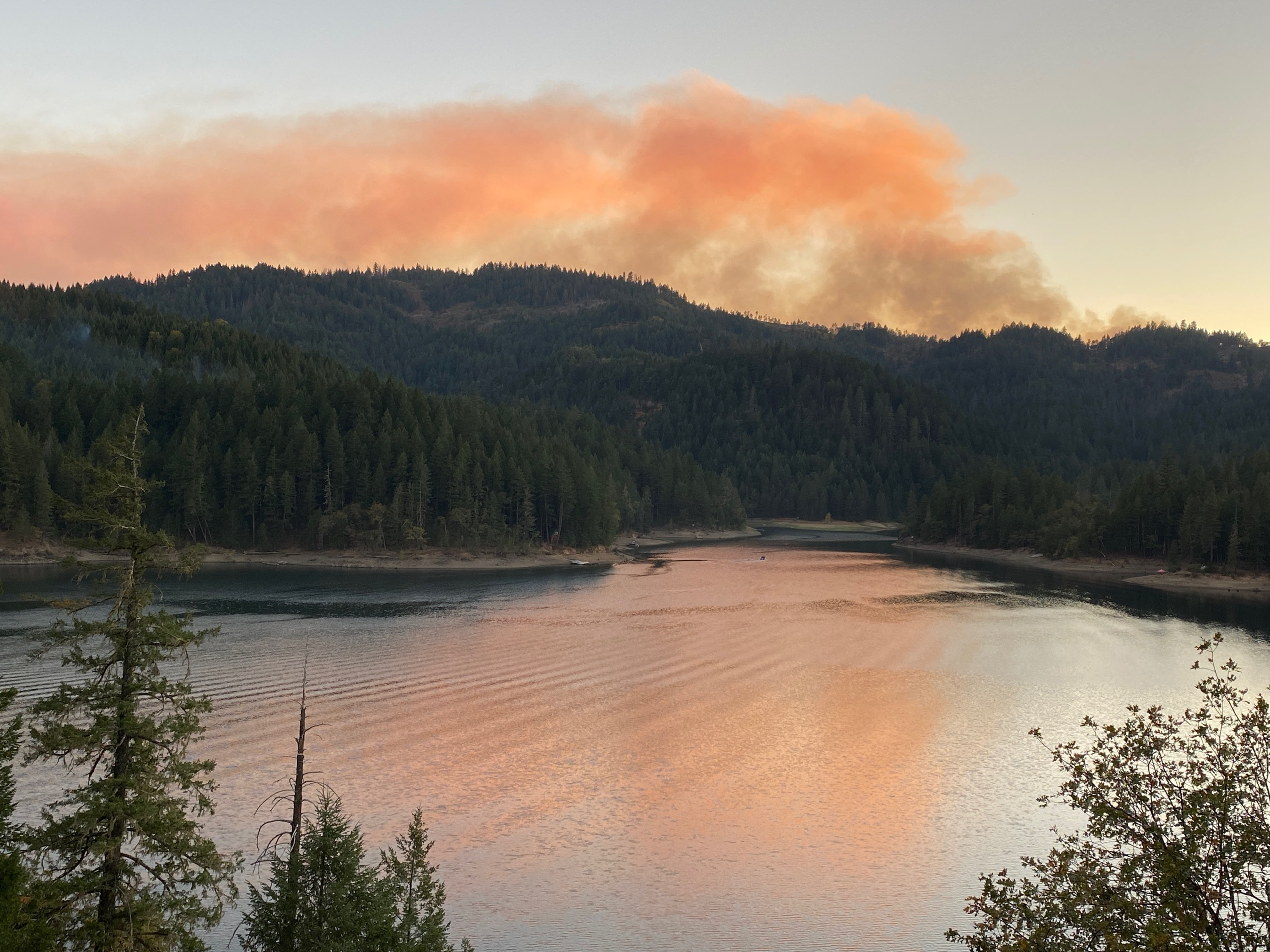

- Location within California Location within the United States
- Location: Trinity County, California
- Coordinates: 40°22′08″N 123°26′00″W
- Type: reservoir
- Primary outflows: Mad River (California)
- Basin countries: United States
- Water volume: 42,000 acre-feet (52×10^{6} m^{3})
- Surface elevation: 2,657 ft (810 m)

Ruth Reservoir (also known as Ruth Lake) is the only reservoir on California's Mad River. The reservoir and adjacent community were named for early settler Ruth McKnight. The reservoir was formed by construction of R. W. Matthews Dam in 1962 (64 years ago) primarily for domestic and industrial water supply to Arcata, Eureka, and other communities around Humboldt Bay. The reservoir was not designed for flood control storage, but nonetheless limited December 1964 flooding to 51 percent of 1955 flow through the community of Mad River (on California State Route 36) and 90 percent of the 1955 flood flow at Arcata. A 2-MW hydro-electric plant with two 1-MW turbine generators is powered by water released from the reservoir. The plant generates 5 GWh during an average water year. Dry-weather releases flow down the Mad River from the reservoir to be recovered by Humboldt Bay Municipal Water District's Ranney collectors near Essex, California.

== Recreation ==
The summer resort community of Ruth developed to expand recreational use of the reservoir. There are 174 cabin lease sites surrounding the reservoir. Registration and inspection is required for all watercraft prior to launching on Ruth Lake. Trailered and motorized boats may be launched only at the marina or at the Ruth Recreational Campground.

== See also ==
- List of dams and reservoirs in California
- List of lakes in California
