= Sly Creek Dam =

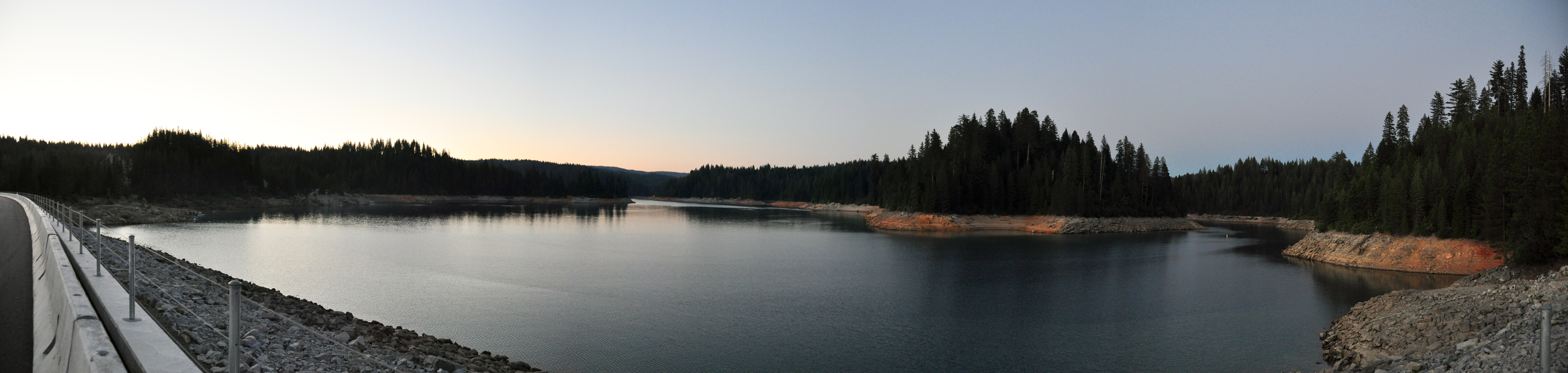
- Sly Creek Reservoir
- Location: Butte County, California
- Coordinates: 39°34′59″N 121°06′51″W
- Opening date: 1961; 64 years ago

Dam and spillways
- Impounds: Lost Creek
- Height: 289 ft (88 m)
- Length: 1,235 ft (376 m)

Reservoir
- Creates: Sly Creek Reservoir
- Total capacity: 65,000 acre⋅ft (80,000,000 m^{3})
- Surface area: 562 acres (227 ha)

Sly Creek Dam (National ID # CA00272) is a dam in Butte County, California.

The earthen rockfill dam was completed in 1961 (64 years ago) by the local public utility, the South Feather Water and Power Agency, formerly known as the Oroville-Wyandotte Irrigation District. The dam stands 289 feet (88 m) high and 1,235 feet (376 m) long at its crest. It impounds Lost Creek for irrigation storage and hydroelectric power, along with the smaller Lost Creek Dam immediately downstream.

The reservoir it creates, Sly Creek Reservoir, has a water surface of 562 acres (227 ha) and a maximum capacity of 65,000 acre-feet (80,000,000 m^{3}). Recreation includes fishing, camping and hiking. The site is surrounded by the Plumas National Forest.

== See also ==
- List of dams and reservoirs in California
- List of lakes in California
