= Bucks Lake =

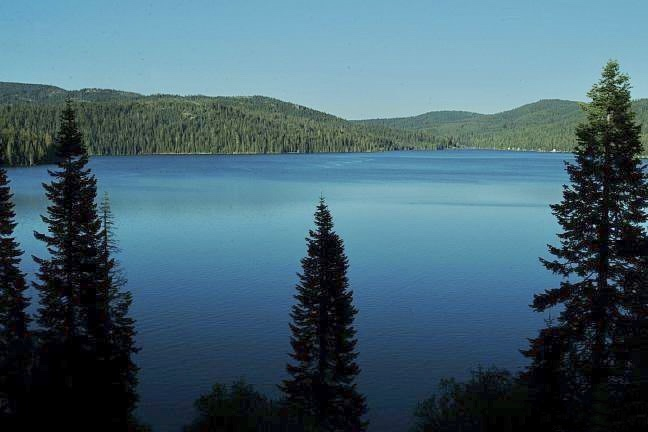
- Bucks Lake from above south shore

- Location within California Location within the United States
- Location: Plumas County, California
- Coordinates: 39°53′05″N 121°09′42″W
- Type: Reservoir
- Primary inflows: Bucks Creek
- Primary outflows: Bucks Creek
- Catchment area: 29.5 square miles (76 km^{2})
- Basin countries: United States
- Managing agency: Pacific Gas and Electric Company
- Built: 1928; 98 years ago
- Surface area: 1,827 acres (739 ha)
- Surface elevation: 5,161 feet (1,573 m)

Bucks Lake is a reservoir in Plumas County, California, created in 1928 by the construction of Bucks Storage Dam on Bucks Creek, a tributary of the Feather River. The dam is managed by the Pacific Gas and Electric Company.

== See also ==
- List of lakes in California
- List of dams and reservoirs in California
