= Cedar Lake (California) =

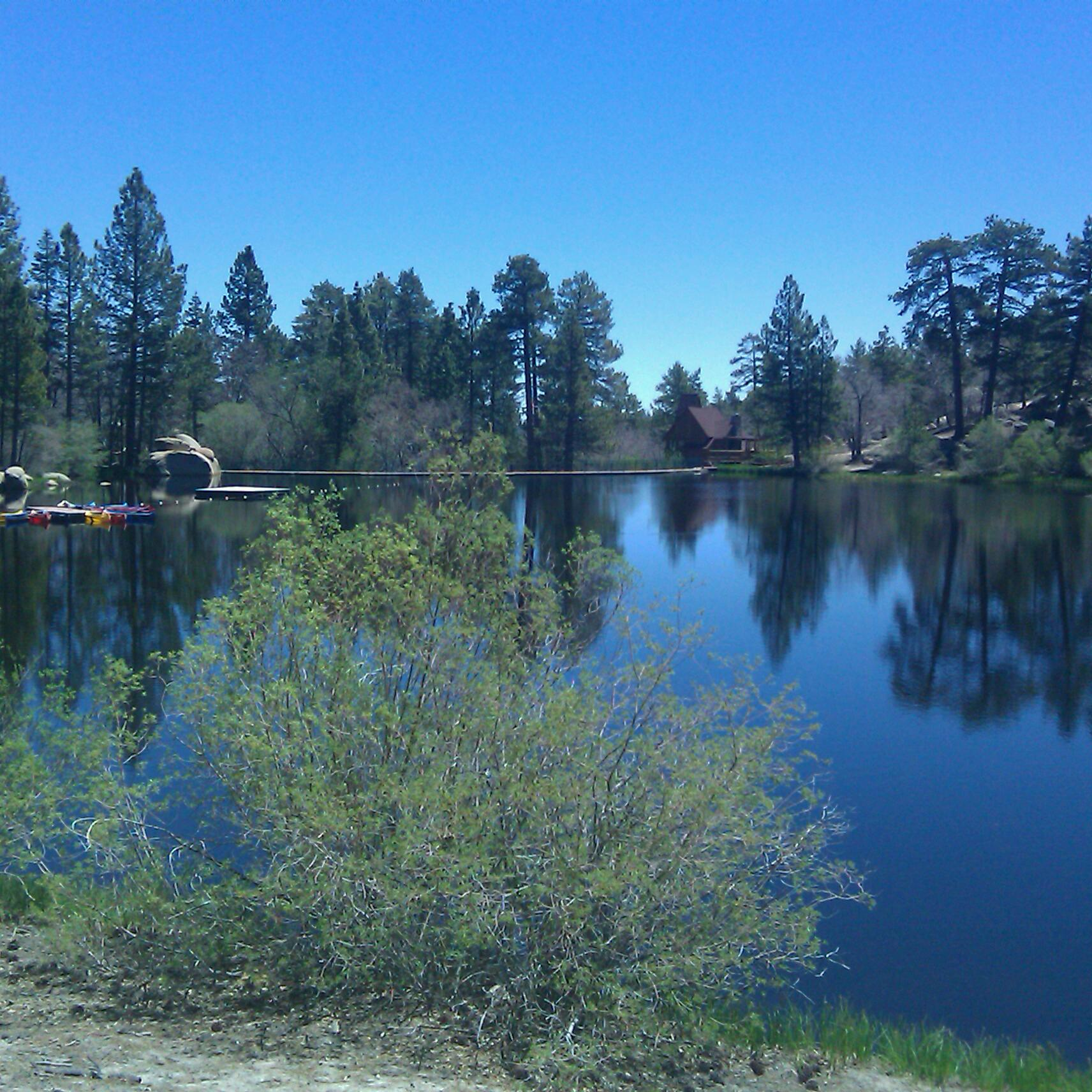

- Location within California Location within the United States
- Location: San Bernardino Mountains, San Bernardino County, California
- Coordinates: 34°13′53″N 116°56′24″W
- Type: Reservoir
- Primary outflows: Talmadge Creek
- Catchment area: 0.5 sq mi (1.3 km^{2})
- Basin countries: United States
- Max. length: 700 ft (210 m)
- Max. width: 300 ft (91 m)
- Surface area: 3 acres (1.2 ha)
- Water volume: 30 acre-feet (37 dam^{3})
- Surface elevation: 7,077 feet (2,157 m)

Cedar Lake is an artificial lake in the San Bernardino Mountains of California that has appeared in dozens of Western films. It is the centerpiece of Cedar Lake Camp, a private retreat center owned and operated by Cedar Lake Camp, Inc., a non profit public benefit corporation.

Located south of the city of Big Bear Lake in San Bernardino County and San Bernardino National Forest, the lake lies about two hours east of Los Angeles and two hours north of San Diego.

The lake is formed by a dam across a minor tributary of Metcalf Creek. The creek feeds Metcalf Bay, an arm of Big Bear Lake, whose waters reach the Pacific Ocean by way of Bear Creek and the Santa Ana River.

== History ==
In 1913, the Talmadge brothers purchased the property where the lake, dam, and camp are now situated. They used the land to graze cattle, then sold it in 1922 to the Bartlett brothers, who built the dam in 1928 (98 years ago). They in turn sold it in 1937 to family member Guy Bartlett, who charged visitors 25¢ for admission to the property. In January 1955, the First Congregational Church of Los Angeles bought 110 acres (45 ha). The church later increased its holdings to 270 acres (110 ha).

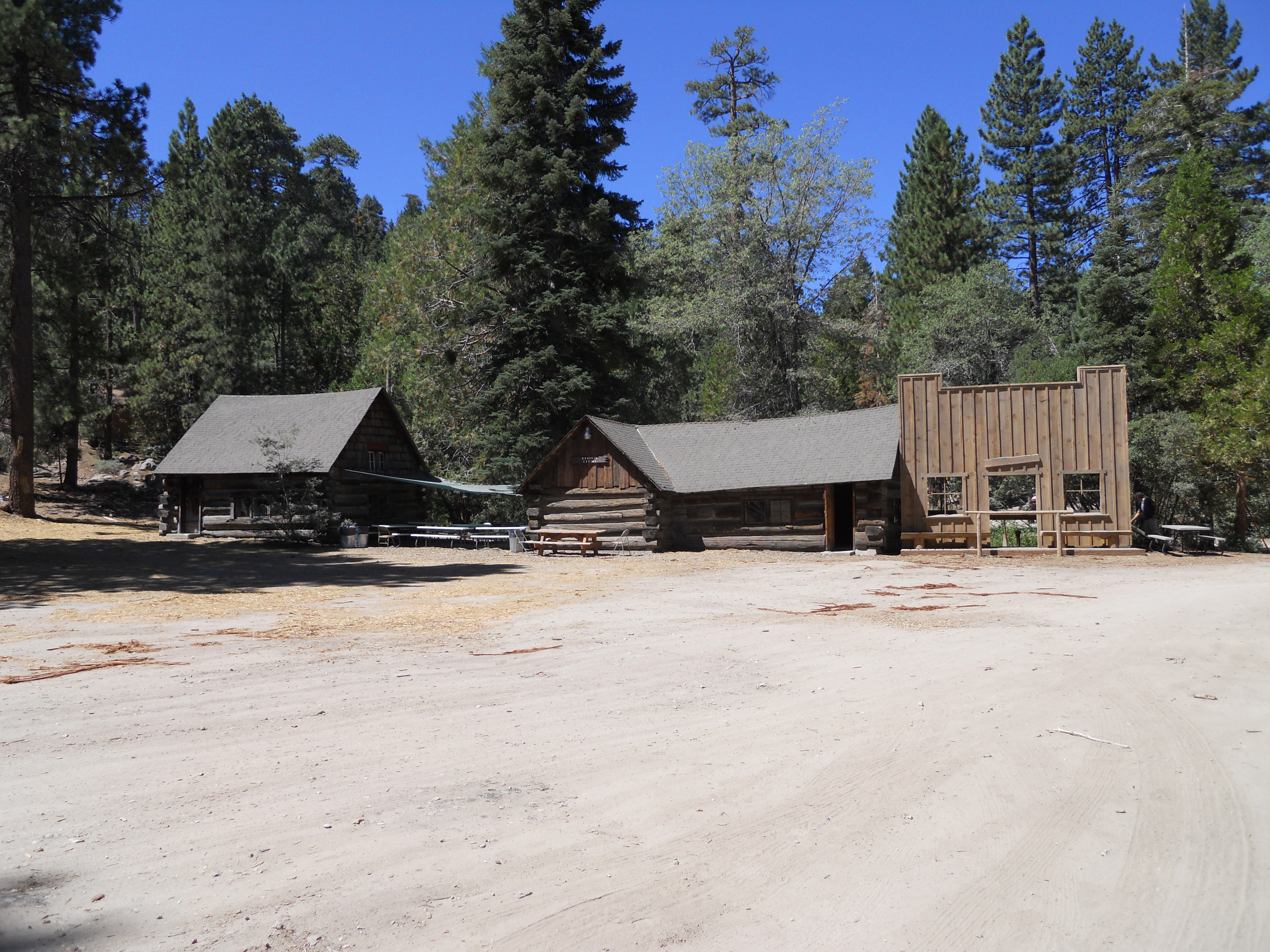
Amish log cabins. About 125 years old. Procured by the movie industry and moved to the lake

=== Filming location ===
The lake's scenery and proximity to Hollywood made it a popular filming location. It appeared in more than forty films, including:

- Brigham Young (1940)
- High Sierra (1941)
- The Parent Trap (1961)

It also appeared in six television series, including:

- at least eight episodes of Bonanza
- a 1959 episode of Have Gun–Will Travel and
- The Roy Rogers Show

On May 19, 2010, a 29-year-old man drowned in the lake after his canoe capsized.

== Cedar Lake Dam ==
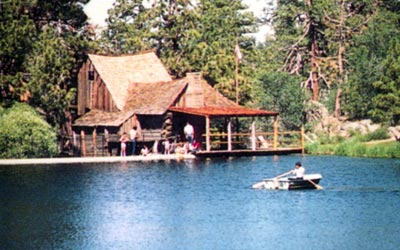
Cedar Lake and Sawmill. The dam is at the waterline to the left.

Cedar Lake Dam was built in 1928 across Talmadge Creek. It is a variable-radius arch dam 28 ft (8.5 m) high and 220 ft (67 m) long containing 650 cubic yards (500 m^{3}) of material. Its crest is 7,101 ft (2,164 m) above sea level.

The old mill house and water wheel can be seen in the Bonanza episode "Thornton's Account".

== Nomenclature ==
There are two other Cedar Lakes in California, both in Siskiyou County:

- one in the Shasta Valley at 41°39′49″N 122°24′29″W and 2,664 ft (812 m) elevation and
- another in the Trinity Mountains at 41°12′26″N 122°29′46″W at 5,718 ft (1,743 m) elevation

== See also ==
- List of dams and reservoirs in California
- List of lakes of California
