= Lake Calero =

- Location within California Location within the United States
- Location: Sacramento County, California
- Coordinates: 38°31′14″N 121°04′53″W
- Type: Reservoir
- Primary outflows: Crevis Creek
- Catchment area: 0.33 sq mi (0.85 km^{2})
- Basin countries: United States
- Surface area: 110 acres (45 ha)
- Water volume: 2,832 acre-feet (3.493×10^{6} m^{3})
- Surface elevation: 259 feet (79 m)

Lake Calero is an artificial lake about 12 miles (19 km) southeast of Rancho Cordova, California in the United States.

The lake is formed by Calero Dam, built in 1982 (44 years ago) across Crevis Creek. Its waters reach the San Francisco Bay by way of Deer Creek, the Cosumnes River, the Mokelumne River, and the Sacramento River.

== Calero Dam ==
Calero Dam is an earthen dam 55 feet (17 m) high and 2,400 feet (730 m) long containing 990,000 cubic yards (760,000 m^{3}) of material. Its crest is 283 feet (86 m) above sea level. It is owned by the Rancho Murieta Community Services District.

== See also ==
- List of lakes in California
- List of reservoirs and dams in California
