= Martis Valley =

Mountain in the American state of California

Coordinates: 39°20′48″N 120°07′06″W

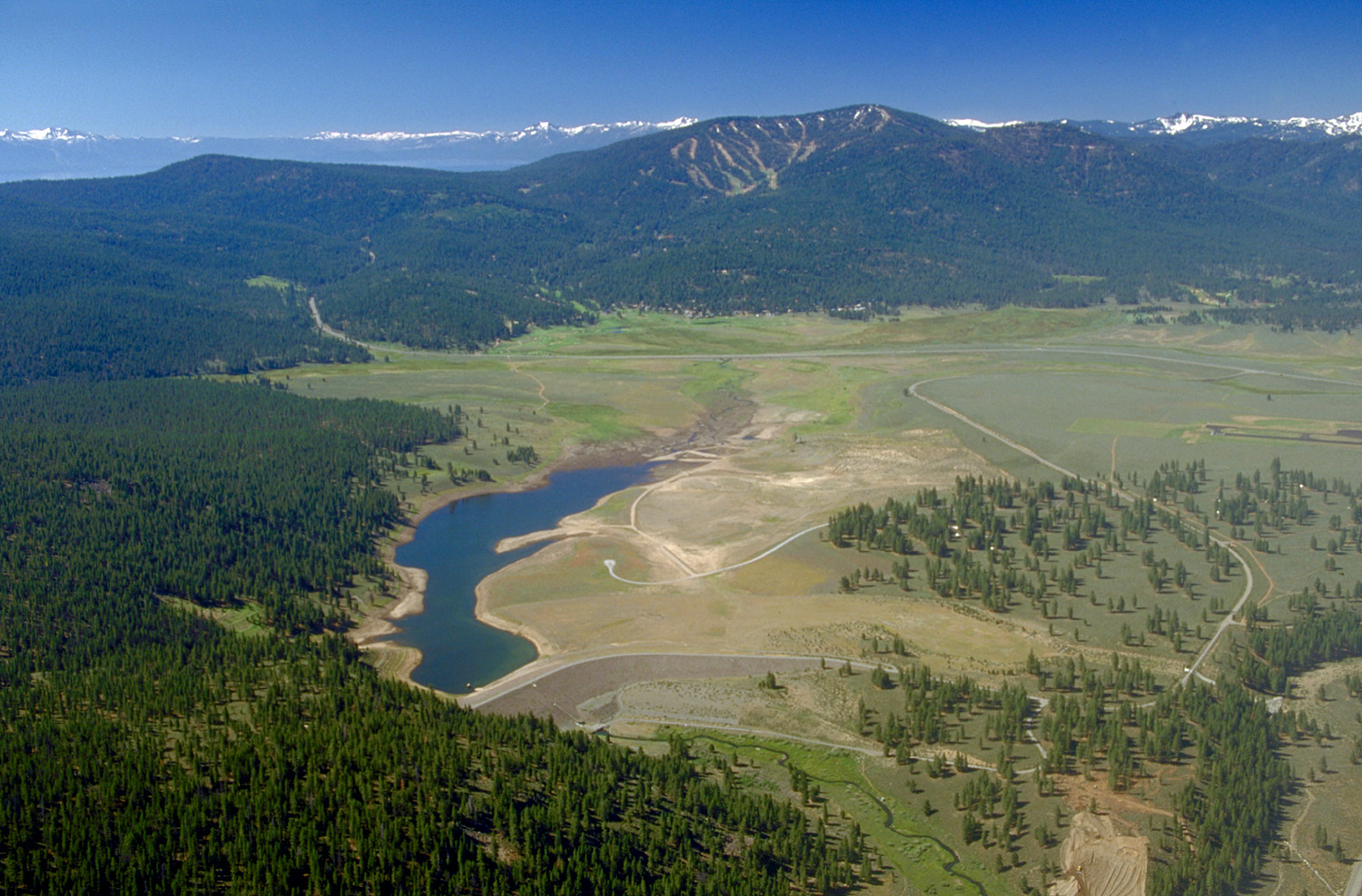
Martis Creek Lake and dam in summer

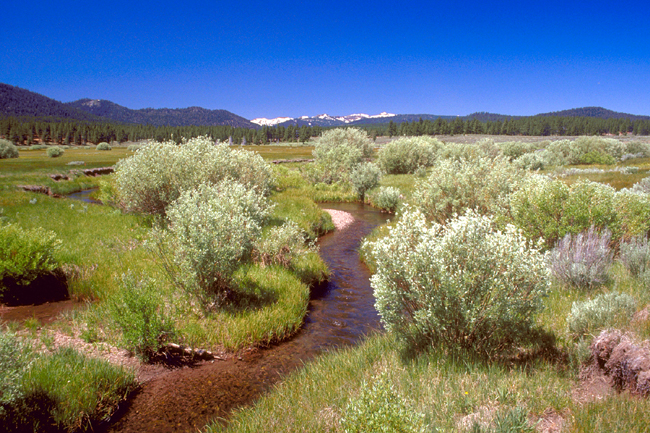
Part of the Martis Creek Basin

Martis Valley is a geographic area of 70 square miles (180 km^{2}) in the United States, extending northward from the North Shore of Lake Tahoe, California, to the west of the California-Nevada border. It is located in Placer and Nevada Counties and is bisected by Martis Creek which flows north to the Truckee River.

== Description ==
Located in the Sierra Nevada mountains north of Lake Tahoe, Martis Valley is largely rural and forested. Elevation ranges from approximately 5,800 to 8,600 feet above mean sea level.

The area is roughly coextensive with the Martis Creek Basin, which drains into the Truckee River. It includes Martis Creek, Donner Creek, and Prosser Creek, major tributaries to the Truckee River. There are several natural lakes, Dry Lake, and Gooseneck Lake, Donner Lake. The Prosser Creek Reservoir, a small manmade lake, was created in 1962. A larger lake, Martis Creek Reservoir, was built in 1972 by the United States Army Corps of Engineers as flood risk reduction for Reno, Nevada. The area also includes Martis Creek Lake Recreation Area, operated by the US Army Corps of Engineers, the northern portion of the Northstar at Tahoe ski resort, the Lahontan Golf Club, and the Truckee-Tahoe Airport. California State Route 267, one of two main roads connecting Truckee and Lake Tahoe, runs through the valley.

== History ==
In 2001 a forest fire burned 15,000 acres (61 km^{2}) of land.

=== Development ===
In the 2000s Martis Valley faced development pressure due to its proximity to Truckee, California and Northstar at Tahoe, a popular ski resort. Developers initially obtained approval to build 6,000 homes on 25,000 acres (100 km^{2}) of subdivisions, which would have more than doubled the population of Truckee, California. In response environmentalists, preservationists and other activists created an organization in 2000, Sierra Watch, that filed lawsuits to prevent the development. After a judge issued an injunction against development, the litigation was eventually settled via a series of agreements that resulted in scaled-back housing projects, as well as preserving and providing more than $100 million for various wildlife and historic preservation initiatives. Among the agreements, developers and conservationists agreed to establish the Martis Fund, in order to develop affordable workforce housing for people who worked in the area, and also to levy a real estate transfer tax to pay for conservation land acquisitions by the Truckee Donner Land Trust. One major result was the preservation of the historic Waddle Ranch, a property of 1,500 acres (6 km^{2}) property dating to the 1850s. Among the properties developed are hundreds of multimillion-dollar vacation homes, Old Greenwood (a golf course and resort), and a new Ritz-Carlton resort at Northstar.

In 2016, Mountainside Partners and Sierra Pacific Industries submitted a final application for entitlements for its proposed Martis Valley West Parcel Specific Plan, a plan that prompted the Attorney General of California to write a letter of concern to Placer County. The plan would include 760 condominium units and luxury homes with 6.6 acres of commercial development on Brockway Summit ridgeline overlooking Lake Tahoe. According to the environmental review for the project, the new development would be built in a dangerous fire corridor, hamper evacuation paths in cases of fire for the North Lake Tahoe/Truckee Region along CA Hwy 267, and create traffic that would negatively impact the clarity of Lake Tahoe. In October 2016, the Placer County Board of Supervisors approved the controversial development proposal, in spite of wide-spread opposition from area residents and local conservation organizations, including Sierra Watch. Sierra Watch, along with the Tahoe-based League to Save Lake Tahoe and Truckee-based Mountain Area Preservation, filed suit to overturn those approvals for violating the California Environmental Quality Act in November 2016.
