= Lake McCloud =

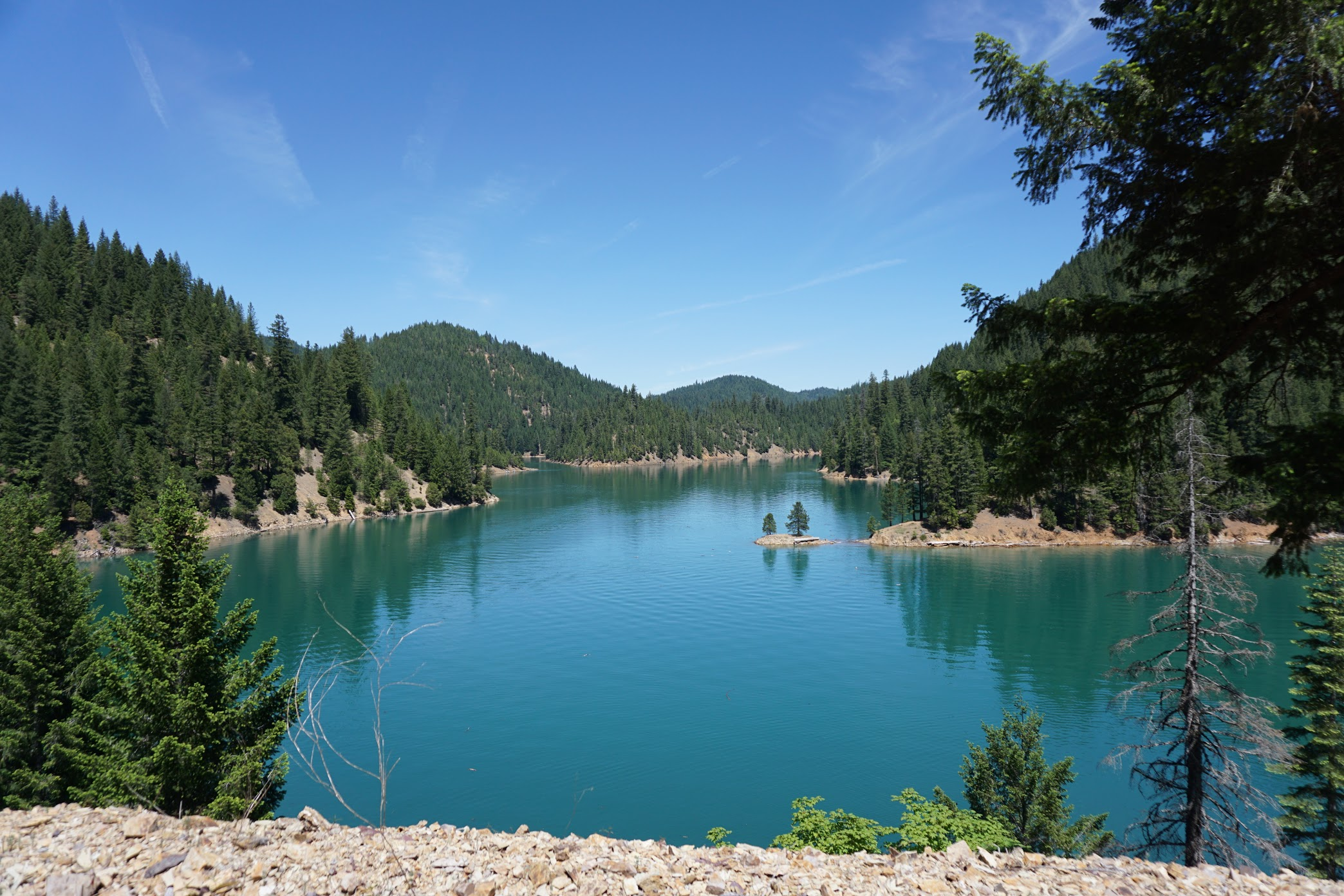
- Looking north over McCloud Reservoir

- Location within California Location within the United States
- Location: Shasta County, California]]
- Coordinates: 41°07′52″N 122°04′14″W
- Type: Reservoir
- Primary inflows: McCloud River
- Primary outflows: McCloud River
- Basin countries: United States
- Surface area: 520 acres (210 ha)
- Water volume: 35,200 acre⋅ft (0.0434 km^{3})
- Surface elevation: 2,648 ft (807 m)
- Settlements: McCloud

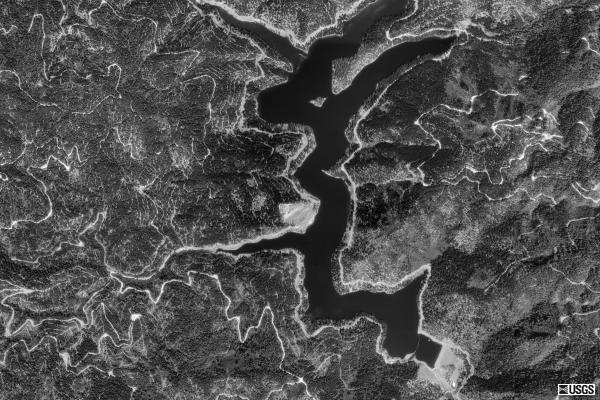
Satellite view

Lake McCloud is a reservoir on the McCloud River in Northern California. The lake forms behind an earthen dam finished in 1965 (61 years ago) by the Pacific Gas and Electric Company to control water flows and for generating hydro-electric power. McCloud Dam (National ID # CA00416) is 235 feet (72 m) high, 630 feet (190 m) long at its crest, and impounds a maximum capacity of 35,200 acre-feet (43,400,000 m^{3}).

The lake is home to a population of rainbow and brown trout, due in large part to the fact that the lake water temperature stays relatively cold all year.

== See also ==
- List of dams and reservoirs in California
- List of lakes in California
