= Rowena Reservoir =

Water storage tanks for Los Angeles, US

Rowena Reservoir (Rowena Tank)
- Location within the Los Angeles metropolitan area Location within California Location within the United States
- Location: Silver Lake, Los Angeles, Los Feliz, Los Angeles, Franklin Hills, Los Angeles
- Coordinates: 34°06′39″N 118°16′21″W
- Type: Reservoir
- Basin countries: United States
- Water volume: 10,000,000 US gallons (38,000,000 L; 8,300,000 imp gal)

The Rowena Reservoir is a system of underground tanks in Franklin Hills, Los Angeles, owned by LADWP. The visible portion of the system is the Rowena Water Feature.

The Rowena Reservoir was formerly a conventional, open-air reservoir, originally built in 1901. In the 1990s it was rebuilt into its current form to comply with regulations.
