= Pit 6 Dam =

Pit No. 6 Dam
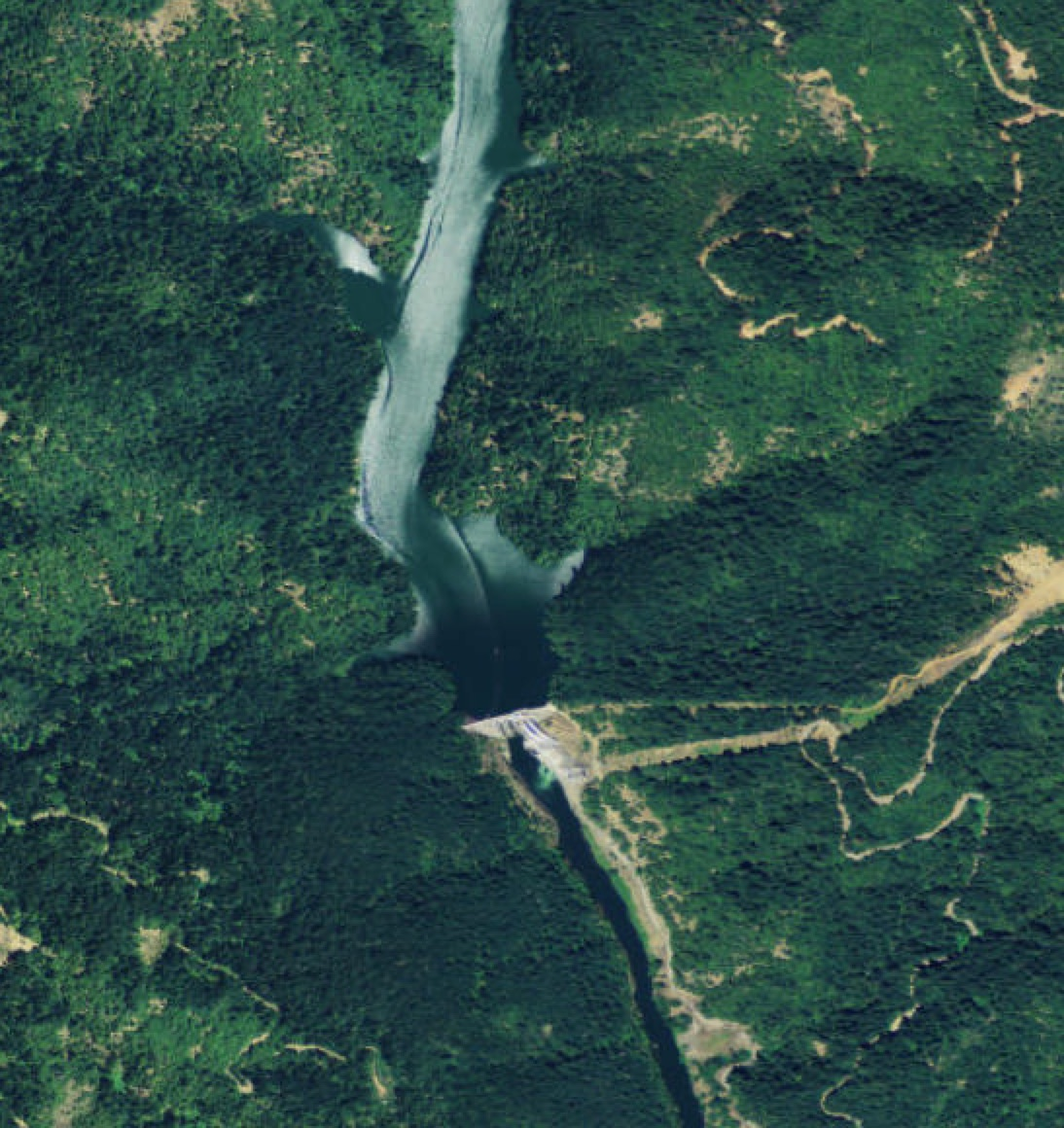
- Satellite view
- Interactive map of Pit No. 6 Dam
- Country: United States
- Location: Shasta County, California
- Coordinates: 40°55′23″N 121°59′38″W
- Opening date: 1965; 61 years ago
- Owner: PG&E

Dam and spillways
- Type of dam: Concrete gravity
- Impounds: Pit River
- Height: 172 ft (52 m)
- Length: 560 ft (170 m)

Reservoir
- Total capacity: 15,700 acre⋅ft (19,400,000 m^{3})
- Catchment area: 5,020 mi^{2} (13,000 km^{2})
- Surface area: 265 acres (107 ha)

Power Station
- Installed capacity: 79 MW
- Annual generation: 341,850,000 KWh (2001–2012)

Pit No. 6 Dam or Pit 6 Dam is a hydroelectric dam on the Pit River in northern California. Its power station generates up to 79 MW.

The dam, built in 1965, is owned by the Pacific Gas and Electric Company. It is 172 feet (52 m) tall and forms the Pit Six Reservoir, which has a capacity of 15,700 acre-feet (19,400,000 m^{3}).

== See also ==
- List of dams and reservoirs in California
- List of lakes in California
