= Salt Spring Valley Reservoir =

Artificial lake in California, USA

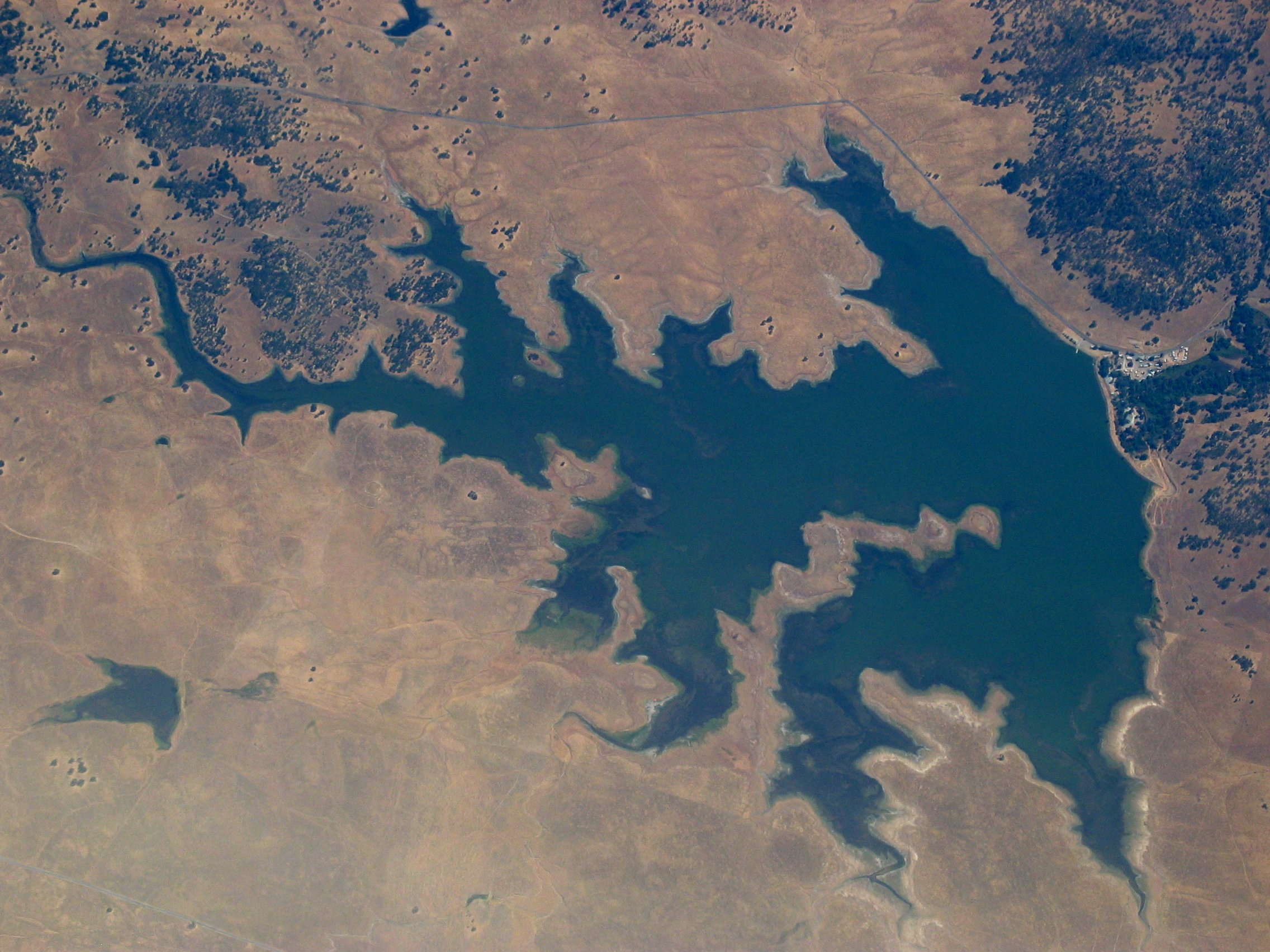

- Location within California Location within the United States
- Location: Calaveras County, California
- Coordinates: 38°02′07″N 120°45′03″W
- Lake type: Reservoir
- Primary outflows: Mokelumne River
- Catchment area: 169 sq mi (440 km^{2})
- Basin countries: United States
- Surface area: 975 acres (395 ha)
- Water volume: 10,900 acre⋅ft (13,400,000 m^{3})
- Surface elevation: 328 m (1,076 ft)
- References: U.S. Geological Survey Geographic Names Information System: Salt Spring Valley Reservoir

Salt Spring Valley Reservoir is an artificial lake formed by the construction of Salt Springs Valley Dam across Rock Creek in the Bear Mountains of Calaveras County, California.

== See also ==
- List of lakes in California
