= Hydraulic fill =

Method of selectively emplacing soil or other materials using a stream of water

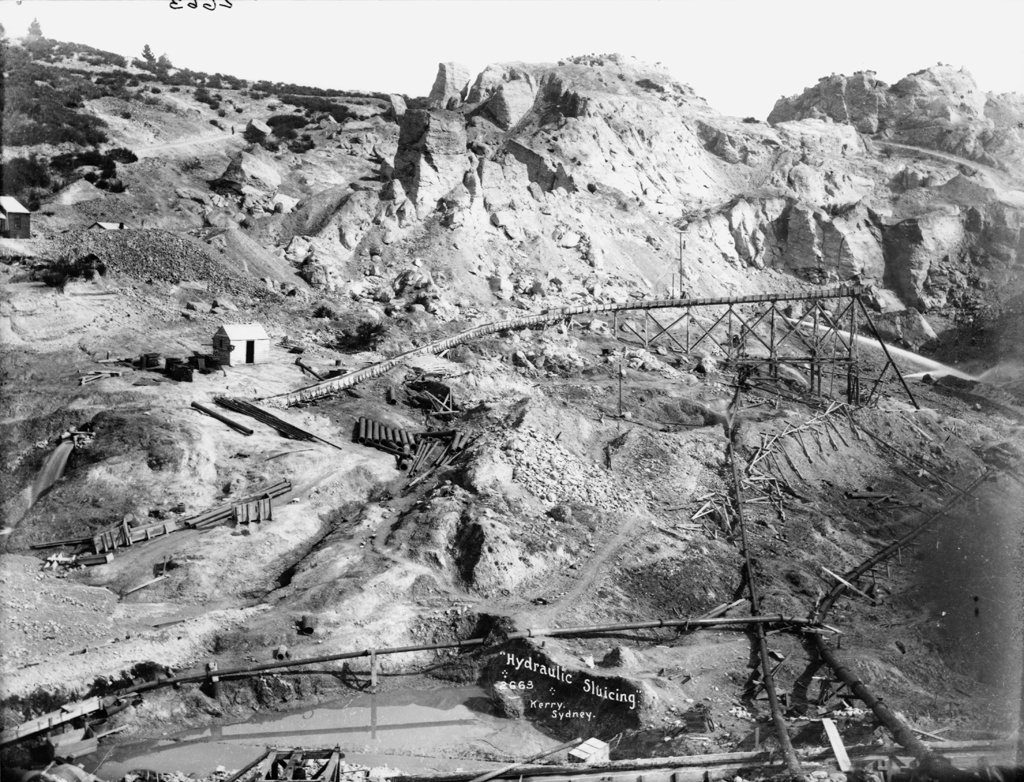
Hydraulic sluicing

Hydraulic fill is a means of selectively emplacing soil or other materials using a stream of water. It is also a term used to describe the materials thus emplaced. Gravity, coupled with velocity control, is used to effect the selected deposition of the material.

Borrow pits containing suitable material are accessible at an elevation such that the earth can be sluiced to the fill after being washed from the bank by high-pressure nozzles. Hydraulic fill is likely to be the most economic method of construction. Even when the source material lacks sufficient elevation, it can be elevated to the sluice by a dredge pump.

In the construction of a hydraulic fill dam, the edges of the dam are defined by low embankments or dykes which are built upward as the fill progresses. The sluices are carried parallel to, and just inside of, these dykes. The sluices discharge their water-earth mixture at intervals, the water fanning out and flowing towards the central pool which is maintained at the desired level by discharge control. While flowing from the sluices, coarse material is deposited first and then finer material is deposited (fine material has a slower terminal velocity thus takes longer to settle, see Stokes' Law) as the flow velocity is reduced towards the center of the dam. This fine material forms an impervious core to the dam. The water flow must be well controlled at all times, otherwise the central section may be bridged by tongues of coarse material which would facilitate seepage through the dam later.

Hydraulic fill dams can be dangerous in areas of seismic activity due to the high susceptibility of the uncompacted, cohesion-less soils in them to liquefaction. The Lower San Fernando Dam is an example of a hydraulic fill dam that failed during an earthquake. In these situations, a dam built of compacted soil may be a better choice.

Poorly built hydraulic fill dams pose a risk of catastrophic failure. The Fort Peck Dam is an example of a hydraulic fill dam that failed during construction where the hydraulic filling process may have contributed to the failure.

Hydraulic fill is also a term used in hard rock mining and describes the placement of finely ground mining wastes into underground stopes in a slurry by boreholes and pipes to stabilize the voids.
