= Mount Hilgard =

Mountain in California, United States

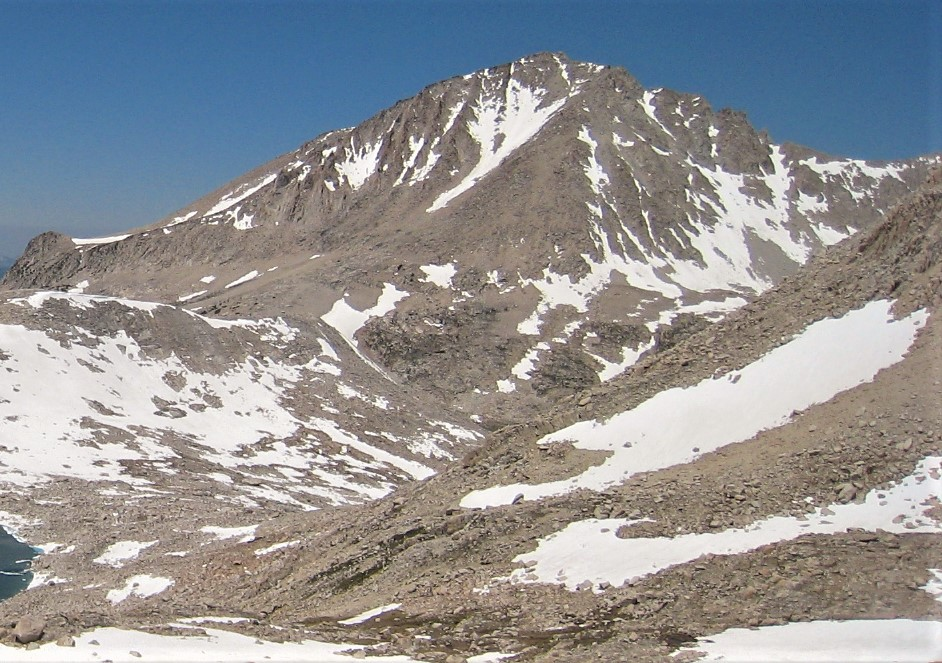
- East aspect

Highest point
- Elevation: 13,361 ft (4,072 m)
- Prominence: 841 ft (256 m)
- Parent peak: Mount Gabb (13,747 ft)
- Isolation: 1.72 mi (2.77 km)
- Listing: Sierra Peaks Section
- Coordinates: 37°21′37″N 118°49′37″W

Naming
- Etymology: Eugene W. Hilgard

Geography
- Location within California Location within the United States
- Country: United States
- State: California
- County: Fresno
- Protected area: John Muir Wilderness
- Parent range: Sierra Nevada
- Topo map: USGS Mount Hilgard

Geology
- Rock type: granite

Climbing
- First ascent: 1905 by Charles F. Urquhart
- Easiest route: class 2 South slope

Mount Hilgard is a 13,361-foot-elevation (4,072-meter) mountain summit located west of the crest of the Sierra Nevada mountain range in Fresno County of northern California, United States. It is situated in the John Muir Wilderness on land managed by Sierra National Forest, approximately eight miles east-southeast of Lake Thomas A Edison, and immediately above the west end of Lake Italy. The nearest higher neighbor is Mount Gabb, 1.75 miles (2.82 km) to the northeast, and Recess Peak is 2.2 miles (3.5 km) to the northwest. The John Muir Trail follows Bear Creek to the west of this remote peak, providing an approach. Mt. Hilgard ranks as the 82nd highest summit in California.

== History ==
This mountain was named by Sierra Club explorer Theodore Solomons for Eugene W. Hilgard (1833–1916), a professor at the University of California, Berkeley, and considered as the father of modern soil science in the United States. The name was suggested to Solomons in 1895 by Ernest C. Bonner, who was one of Hilgard's former students. The Hilgard name may have been initially meant for the current Recess Peak, according to Solomon's account. The first ascent of the summit was made July 10, 1905, by Charles F. Urquhart, USGS topographer.

== Climate ==
According to the Köppen climate classification system, Mount Hilgard is located in an alpine climate zone. Most weather fronts originate in the Pacific Ocean, and travel east toward the Sierra Nevada mountains. As fronts approach, they are forced upward by the peaks, causing them to drop their moisture in the form of rain or snowfall onto the range (orographic lift). Precipitation runoff from this mountain drains into the San Joaquin River watershed.

== See also ==
- List of mountain peaks of California

== Gallery ==
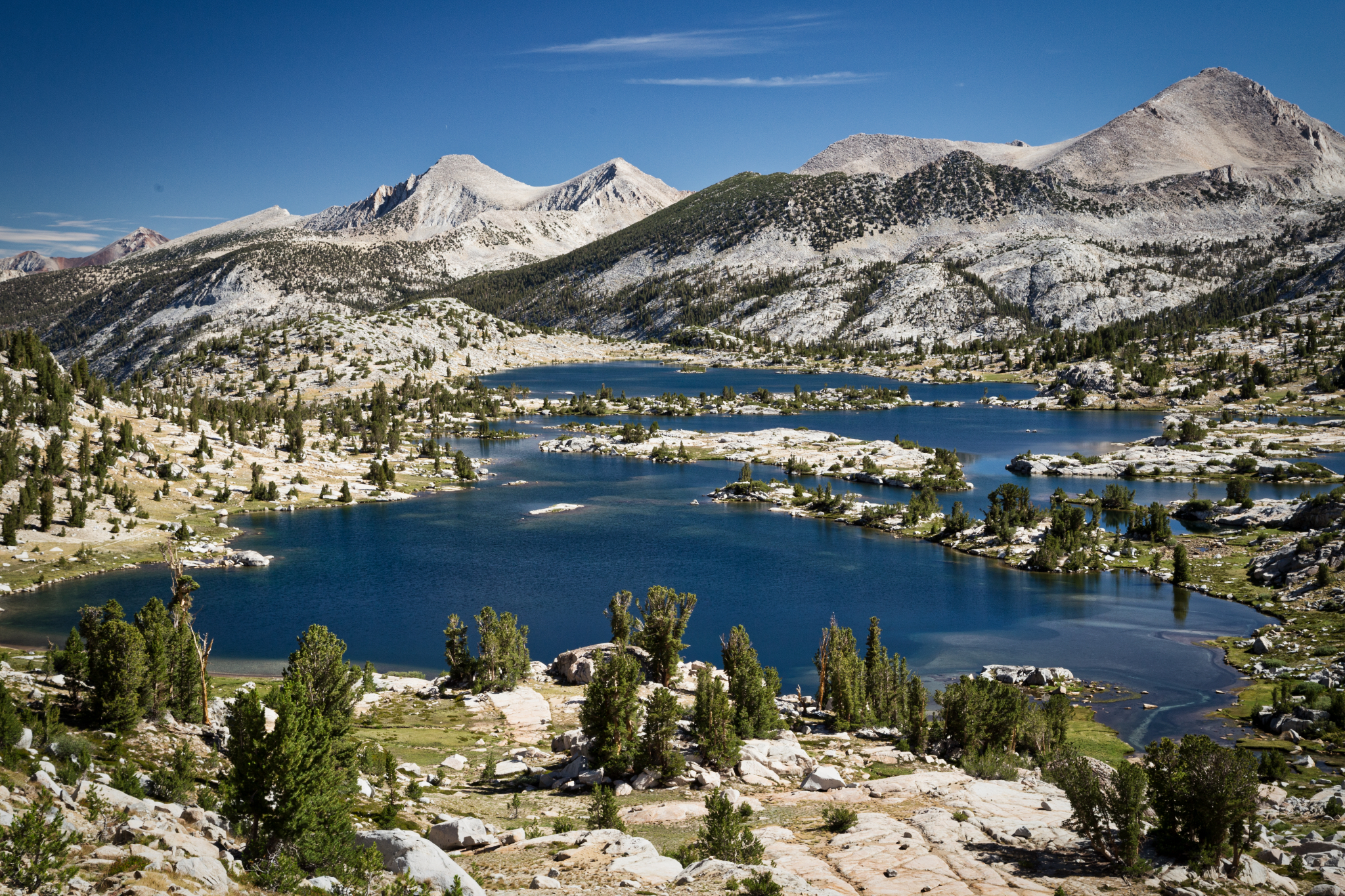
Marie Lake with Mount Hilgard in upper right corner. Recess Peak left of center.

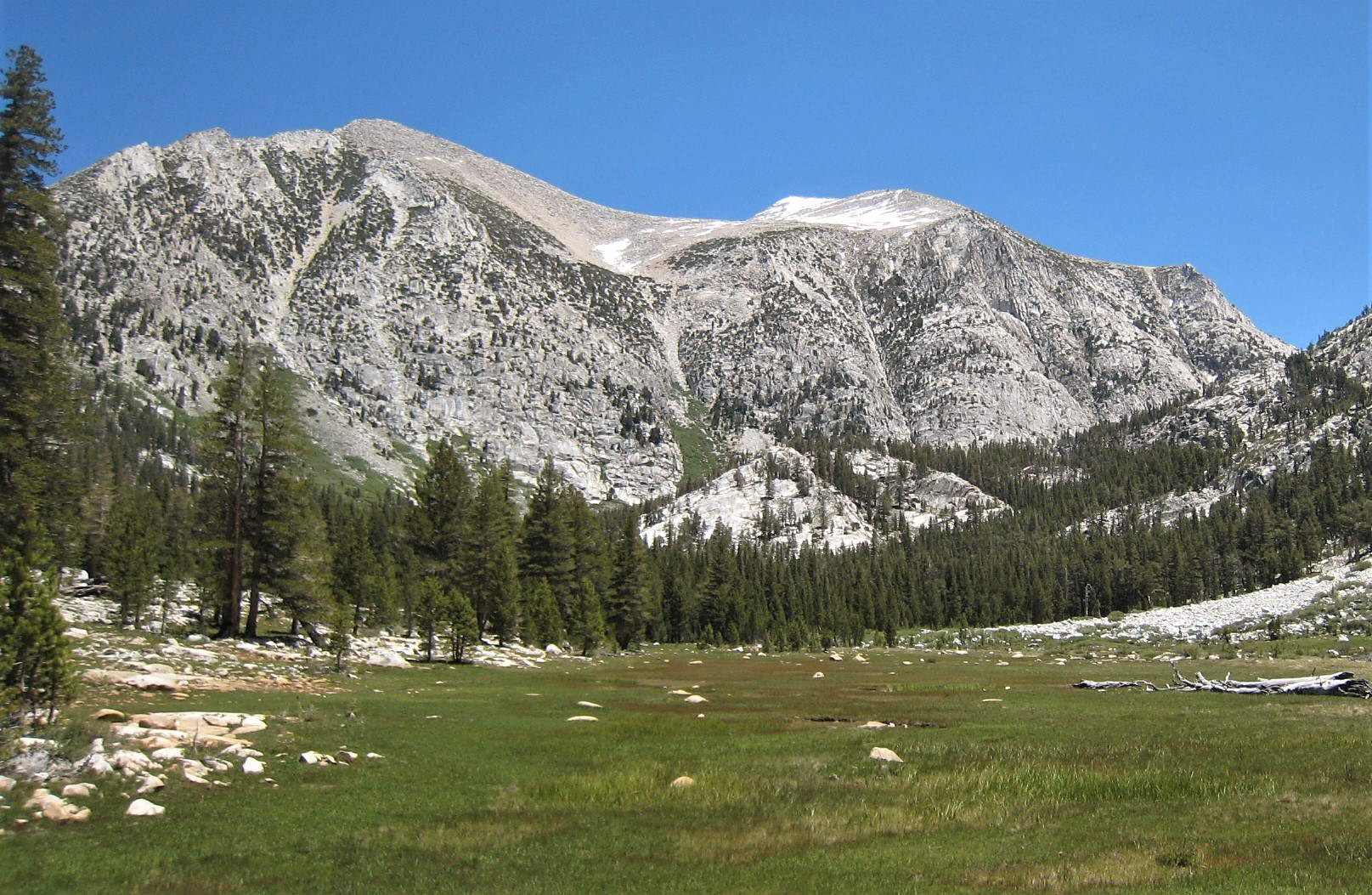
Mount Hilgard, west aspect

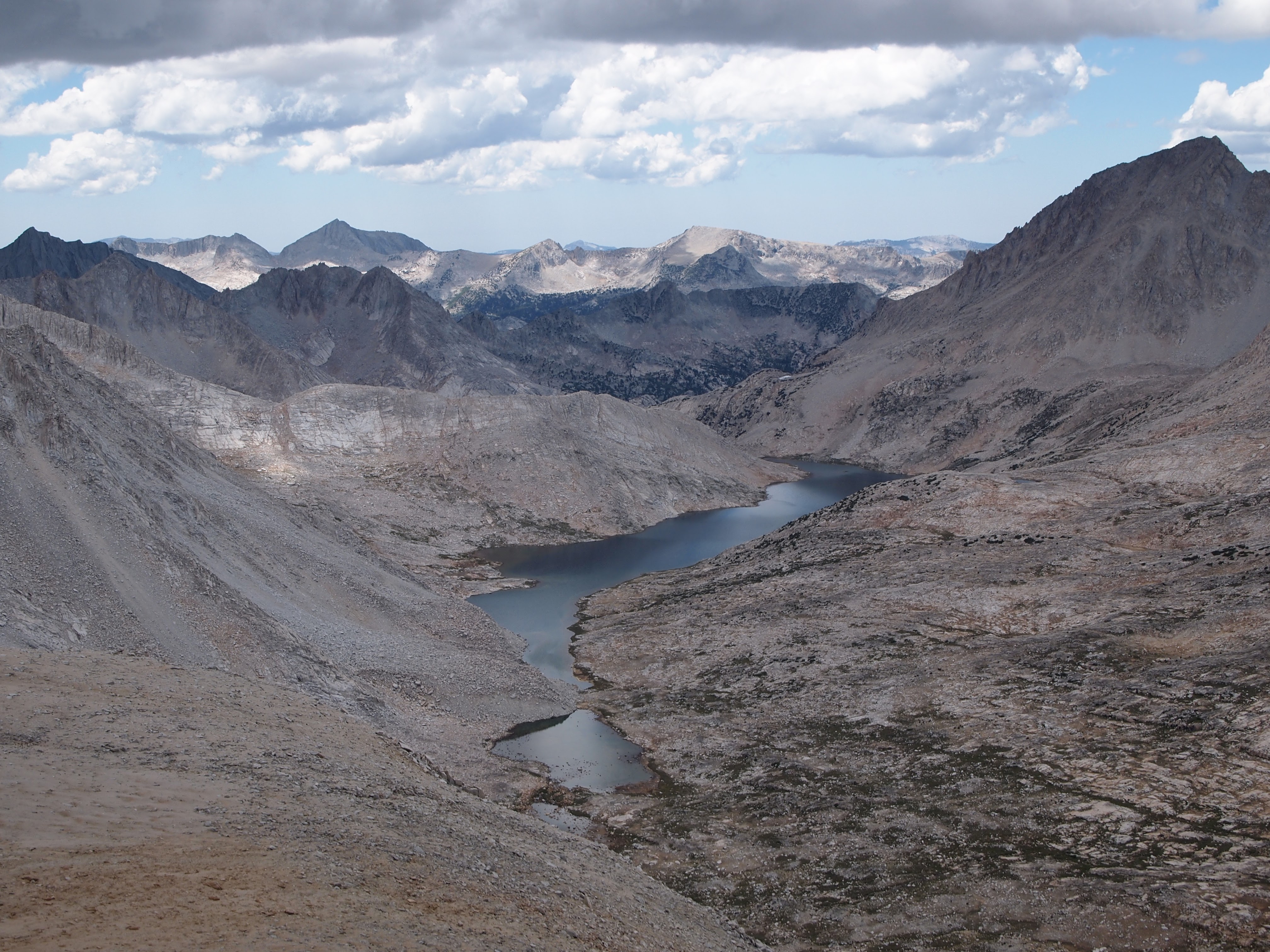
Lake Italy with Mt. Hilgard, right
