= Sharktooth Peak =

Mountain in California, United States

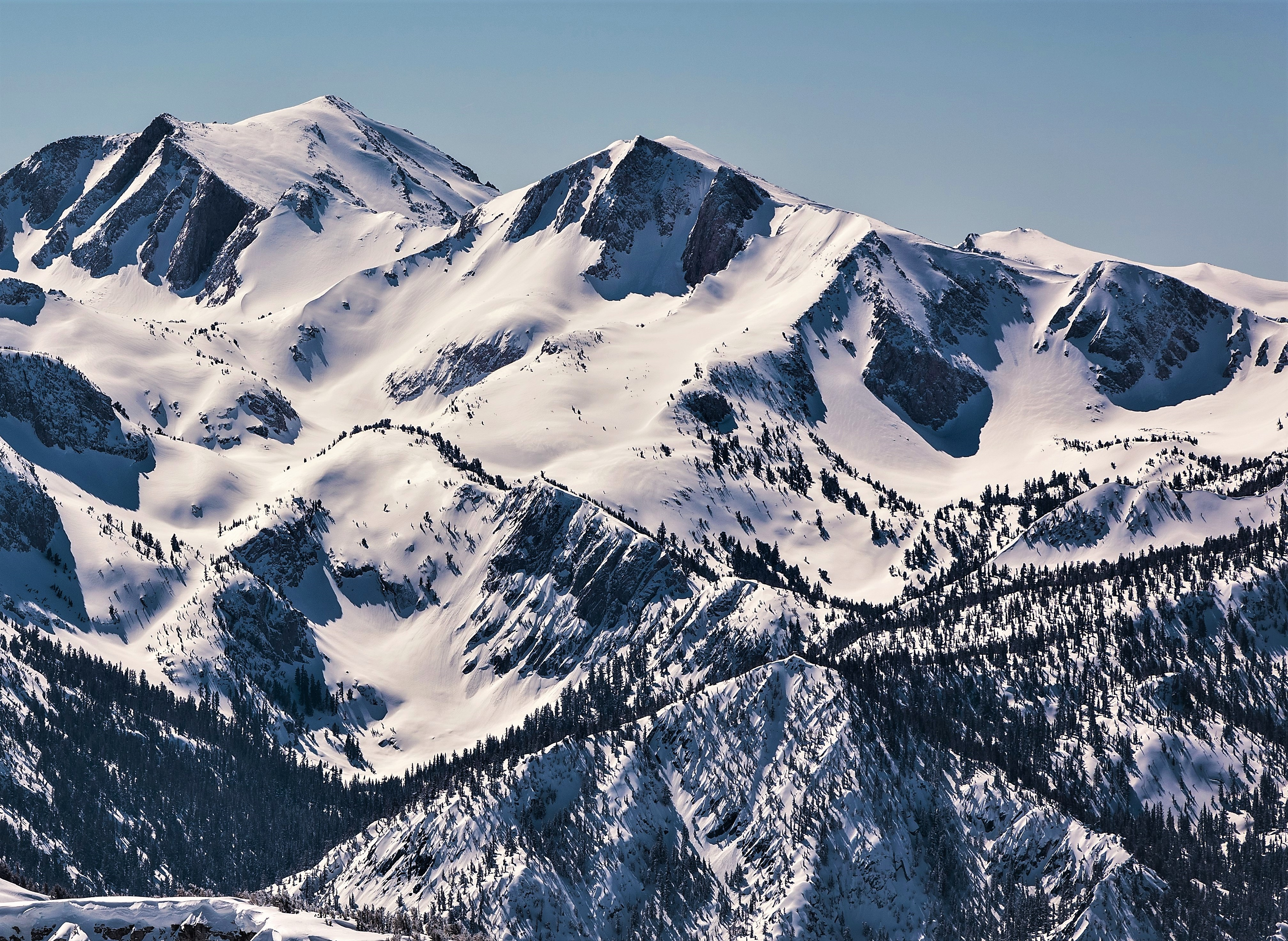
- North aspect of Sharktooth Peak centered. (Silver Peak behind, upper left)

Highest point
- Elevation: 11,660 ft (3,554 m)
- Prominence: 340 ft (104 m)
- Parent peak: Silver Peak
- Isolation: 0.81 mi (1.30 km)
- Coordinates: 37°28′50″N 119°01′36″W

Geography
- Location within California Location within the United States
- Location: Fresno County, California, U.S.
- Parent range: Sierra Nevada
- Topo map: USGS Sharktooth Peak

Geology
- Rock age: Cretaceous
- Mountain type: Fault block
- Rock type: Granodiorite

Climbing
- First ascent: < 1951
- Easiest route: Easy scramble, class 2

Sharktooth Peak is a summit located in Fresno County, California. It is situated on Silver Divide in the Sierra Nevada range. It is set in the John Muir Wilderness, one mile (1.6 km) north-northwest of line parent Silver Peak, and 11 miles (18 km) south-southwest of the town of Mammoth Lakes. The first ascent of the summit was made prior to 1951 by an unknown party. The Southeast Ridge was first climbed in 2002 by Steve Eckert.

== Climate ==
According to the Köppen climate classification system, Sharktooth Peak is located in an alpine climate zone. Most weather fronts originate in the Pacific Ocean, and travel east toward the Sierra Nevada mountains. As fronts approach, they are forced upward by the peaks (orographic lift), causing them to drop their moisture in the form of rain or snowfall onto the range. Precipitation runoff from the mountain drains into tributaries of the Middle Fork San Joaquin River.
