= Lake Virginia =

Lake Virginia may refer to:

- Lake Virginia (California), United States
- Lake Virginia (Fiordland), in Fiordland National Park

== See also ==
- Virginia Lake (disambiguation)
