= Eugene W. Hilgard =

German-American pedologist (1833 – 1916)

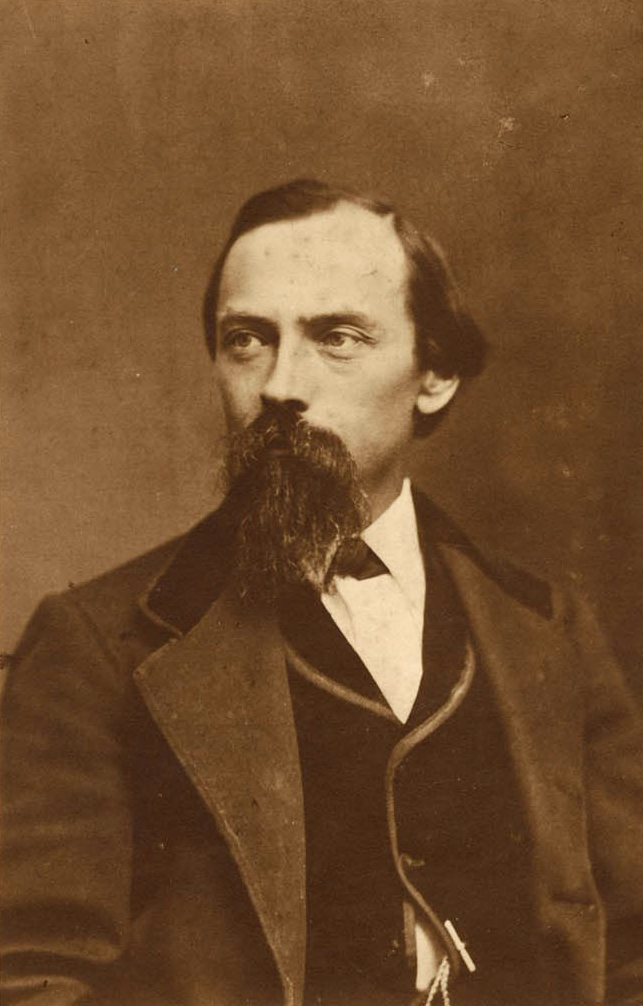
- Born: January 5, 1833; Zweibrücken, Kingdom of Bavaria
- Died: January 8, 1916 (aged 83); Berkeley, California, United States
- Education: Royal Mining School; University of Zurich; University of Heidelberg
- Scientific career
- Fields: Soil Science
- Workplaces: University of Mississippi; University of Michigan; University of California, Berkeley
- Doctoral advisor: Robert Bunsen

Eugene Woldemar Hilgard (January 5, 1833 – January 8, 1916) was a German-American expert on pedology (the study of soil resources). An authority on climate as a soil forming factor, soil chemistry and reclamation of alkali soils, he is considered as the father of modern soil science in the United States.

== Biography ==
=== Early life ===
Hilgard was born at Zweibrücken, Kingdom of Bavaria, January 5, 1833, the son of Theodore Erasmus and Margaretha (Pauli) Hilgard. His father was a successful lawyer, holding the position of chief justice of the court of appeals of the province of Rhenish Bavaria. His liberally-minded father was displeased by the increasingly reactionary government of Ludwig I, and having secured a letter of recommendation from Lafayette, he resolved to move his family to America. After a 14-day overland trip to Le Havre, followed by a 62-day ocean voyage aboard the ship Marengo, the family arrived in New Orleans, Louisiana, on Christmas Day 1835, then traveled up the Mississippi River to St. Louis, Missouri, finally settling on a farm in Belleville, Illinois. His father had chosen that particular area based on the writings of Gottfried Duden, who had described the area as a sort of El Dorado for German immigrants.

The youngest of nine children, Eugene received his early education under the tutelage of his father. During an epidemic of malaria that killed his eldest sister, Eugene was stricken as well, and the resultant fevers and impaired eyesight plagued him for the next several years of his young adulthood. His mother died in 1842, leaving Eugene's care in the hands of his remaining sisters. He educated himself in the fields of botany, chemistry, and physics, but his continued precarious health led doctors to suggest a change in climate, so in 1848 he traveled to Washington, D.C., with his eldest brother Julius, who was returning to his job at the United States Coast Survey.

Eugene spent four months in Washington, meeting through his brother such noted scientists as Joseph Henry, Spencer Fullerton Baird, and Alexander Dallas Bache. That fall he went to Philadelphia to attend a variety of lectures, and during a visit to the laboratory of James Curtis Booth at the Franklin Institute, it was suggested that he return to Germany to study analytical chemistry. He sailed from New York in March 1849 aboard the steamship Hermann, bound for Bremen and then to Heidelberg to rejoin his brother Theodore, who had gone there in 1846 to study medicine.

=== Education in Europe ===
At the University of Heidelberg, he began study under Leopold Gmelin and Theodor Ludwig Wilhelm Bischoff but soon became disenchanted with the overall state of instruction at the university. During a summer trip with his brother Theodore to their native province, the turbulence of the Palatinate-Baden rebellion forced the pair to seek safety in Speyer, where their cousin was a government official. At his suggestion, they traveled to Switzerland and enrolled at the University of Zurich. Hilgard spent three semesters at Zurich, studying under notable professors such as Lorenz Oken, Arnold Escher von der Linth, and Carl Jacob Löwig, the latter of whom appointed him as his laboratory and teaching assistant.

In 1850 he left Zurich for the Royal Mining School in Freiberg. Despite a productive period of study under Karl Friedrich Plattner, a recurrence of his health problems, combined with two near-death experiences involving cyanide gas and mercury vapor, led him to conclude he was not cut out for the hazardous world of mining and smelting. Hilgard returned to Heidelberg in 1851, where Robert Bunsen had just succeeded Leopold Gmelin as the chair in chemistry. He soon decided to obtain a Ph.D. with Bunsen as his advisor. For his thesis, Hilgard investigated the constituent parts of a candle flame and was the first to identify four distinct parts and processes, as opposed to the three that had previously been supposed. He received his Ph.D. in 1853.

After graduation, he lived in Spain and Portugal for two years. While in Spain, he met his future wife, Jesusa Alexandrina Bello, the daughter of a colonel in the Spanish Army. He married her in 1860 during a subsequent visit to Spain.

Hilgard's father moved back to Germany in 1855, remarried his niece Marie Theveny, and died in Heidelberg in 1873.

=== Professional career ===
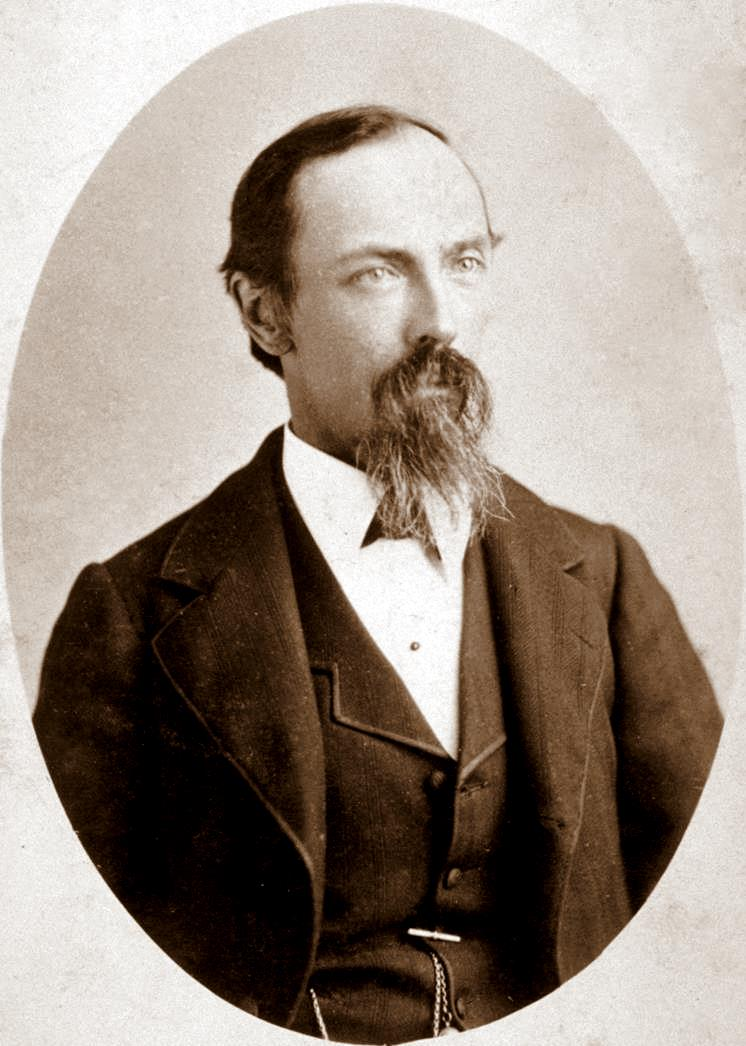
Hilgard as Professor at Berkeley

Returning to America, he served as assistant state geologist of Mississippi from 1855 to 1857; was chemist in charge of the laboratory of the Smithsonian Institution, and lecturer on chemistry in the National Medical College (now part of George Washington University), 1857–1858; state geologist of Mississippi from 1858 to 1866, and professor of chemistry at the University of Mississippi and state geologist from 1866 to 1873. Hilgard was appointed as custodian of the University of Mississippi's buildings for the duration of the Civil War. Under his custodianship, many of the university's buildings were used as hospitals for Union and Confederate soldiers. Some Sisters of Mercy from Vicksburg traveled to Oxford to serve as nurses in these makeshift hospitals.

In 1873 he accepted an appointment at the University of Michigan, where he was professor of mineralogy, geology, zoology, and botany for two years. From 1875 to 1904 he was professor of agricultural chemistry at the University of California, Berkeley and director of the state agricultural experiment station.

He conducted the agricultural division of the Northern Transcontinental Survey, 1881–1883, and made a specialty of the study of soils of the southwestern states and of the Pacific slope in their relation to geology, to their chemical and physical composition, to their native flora, and to their agricultural qualities. He was elected to a membership in the National Academy of Sciences in 1872.

== Commemoration and honors ==
- Hilgard Hall on the University of California, Berkeley campus
- Streets named after him in Berkeley, Los Angeles and Davis.
- The Hilgard Cut, a railroad cut on the campus of the University of Mississippi, designed by Hilgard in 1858
- The mineral hilgardite
- The U.S. Liberty ship SS Eugene W. Hilgard
- Hilgard received the degree of Doctor of Laws from the University of Mississippi in 1882, from the University of Michigan in 1887, and from Columbia University in 1887.
- In 1903, the University of Heidelberg reconferred the title of Doctor of Philosophy after fifty years, in recognition of the scientific work accomplished since the doctorate was first conferred in 1853.
- The journal Hilgardia (published from 1925 to 1995) was named in his honor.
- Hilgard, Oregon
- Mount Hilgard, a mountain in California's Sierra Nevada

== Publications ==
He published a report on the agriculture and geology of Mississippi (1860); on the Geology of Louisiana and the Rock-salt Deposits of Petite Anse Island (1869); reports on the Experimental Work of the College of Agriculture, University of California (1877-1898); Report on the Arid Regions of the Pacific Coast (1887); and monographs on Mississippi, Louisiana, and California, in the Report on Cotton Production of the United States Census Report of 1880, which he edited. He prepared for the United States Weather Bureau in 1892 a discussion of the Relations of Climate to Soils, which was translated into several European languages and gained for the author in 1894, from the Royal Bavarian Academy of Sciences, the Liebig medal for important advances in agricultural science. Together with his book Soils (1906), Climate... established the basis for understanding climate as a factor of soil formation in the United States. He also published numerous papers on chemical, geological, and agricultural subjects, in government reports, and in scientific journals both at home and abroad.

- (1860) Report on the geology and agriculture of the State of Mississippi
- (1884) Report on the Physical and Agricultural Features of the State of California, with a discussion of the present and future of cotton production in the state.
- (1885) The Phylloxera at Berkeley
- (1892) The Relation of Soils to Climate
- (1906) Soils, Their Formation, Properties, Composition, and Relations to Climate and Plant Growth in the Humid and Arid Regions
