= Hell for Sure Lake =

Lake in California, United States

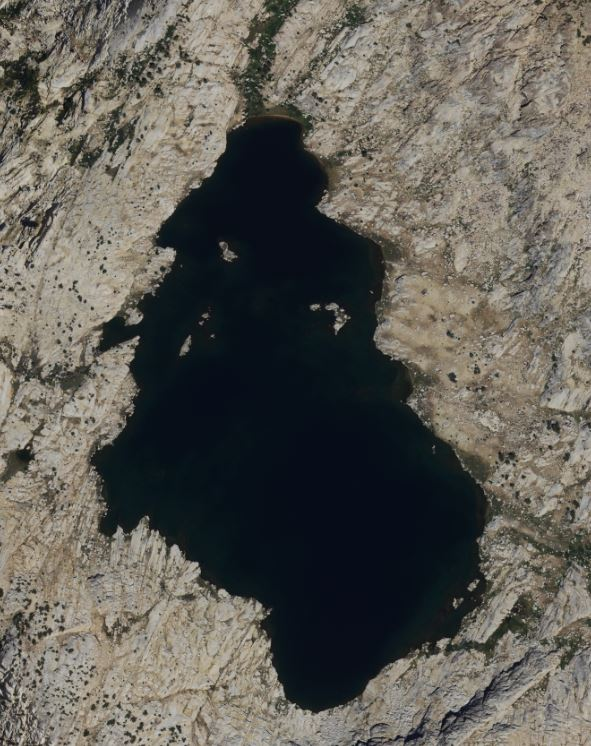
- Aerial image of Hell for Sure Lake

- Location within California Location within the United States
- Location: Sierra Nevada, within Fresno County, California
- Coordinates: 37.1386°N 118.8001°W
- Type: Alpine lake
- Part of: Red Mountain Basin
- Primary outflows: Fleming Creek
- Basin countries: United States
- Max. length: 2,506 ft (764 m)
- Max. width: 1,425 ft (434 m)
- Surface area: 24.13 hectares (59.6 acres)
- Shore length^{1}: 3.16 km (1.96 mi)
- Surface elevation: 10,768 feet (3,282 m)
- Islands: 11
- ^{1} Shore length is not a well-defined measure.

Hell for Sure Lake is an alpine lake located in the John Muir Wilderness within the Sierra Nevada mountain range in California, United States. The lake is at an elevation of 10,768 feet (3,282 m), has a few small, rocky islands, and lies between Red Mountain to the north and Mount Hutton to the south. The Hell for Sure Trail and Hell for Sure Pass are named after this lake, with the region being known for its rough terrain.

The rocks that surround Hell for Sure Lake and its nearby mountains are estimated to be over 100 million years old.

== Nearby lakes ==
Within the Red Mountain basin are a few lakes that are close to Hell for Sure Lake, including Horseshoe Lake, Disappointment Lake, and Devil's Punchbowl.

== See also ==
- List of lakes in California
