= Nüümü Hu Hupi =

Lake in the state of California, United States

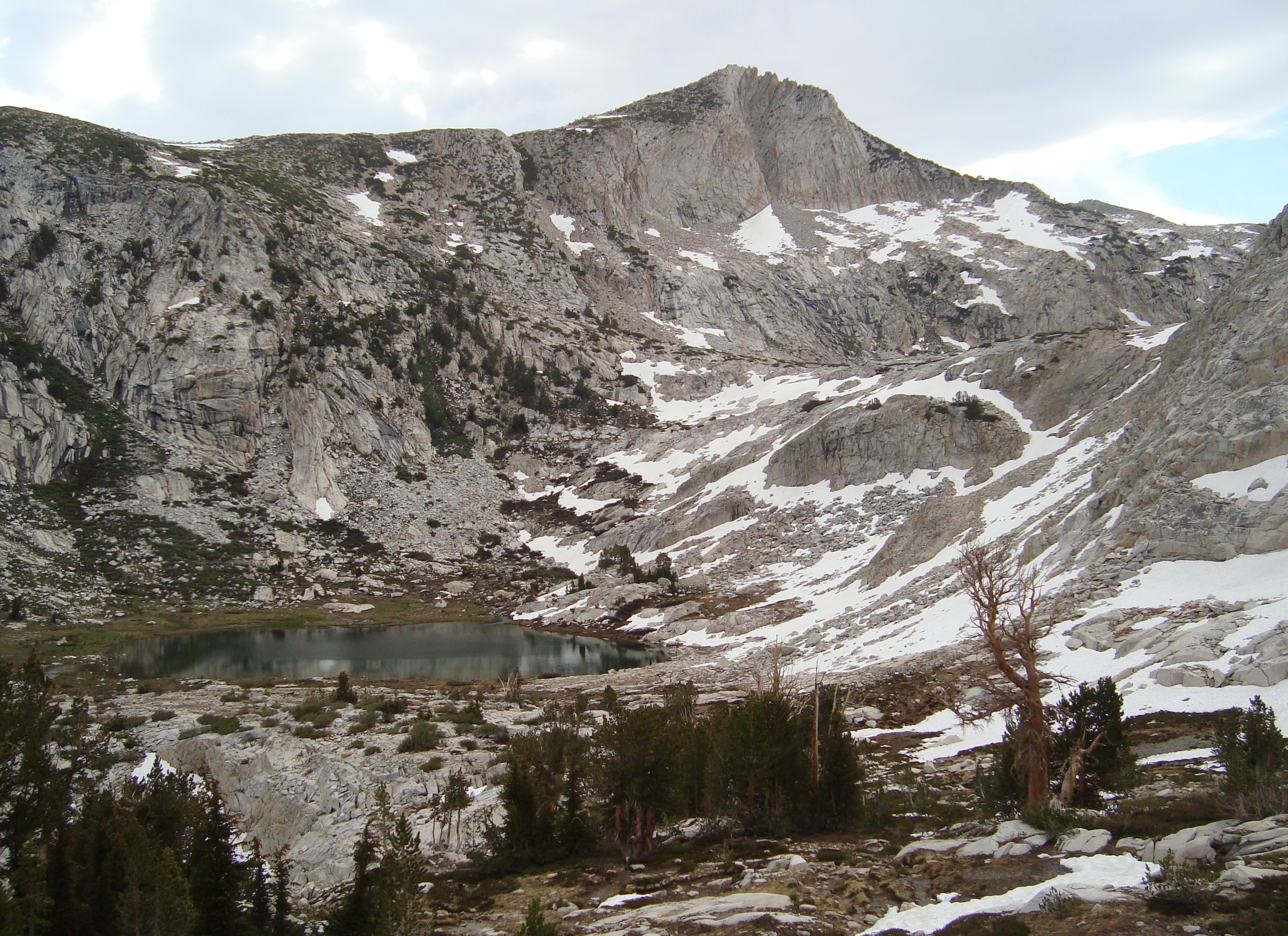
- View from the south-west (June 30, 2009)

- Location within California Location within the United States
- Location: John Muir Wilderness, Sierra Nevada, Fresno County, California, United States
- Coordinates: 37°28′36.78″N 118°55′22.44″W
- Basin countries: United States
- Surface elevation: 10,315 ft (3,144 m)

Nüümü Hu Hupi (formerly Squaw Lake) is a small lake in the eastern Sierra Nevada, near the John Muir Trail in John Muir Wilderness. It is located 1.8 miles (2.9 km) west-northwest of Mount Izaak Walton and 5 miles (8.0 km) north-northeast of Lake Thomas A Edison. at an altitude of 10,315 feet (3,144 m). The outflow of Nüümü Hu Hupi becomes Fish Creek, which eventually joins the Middle Fork of the San Joaquin River. The name was controversial because squaw is an ethnic and sexual slur, historically used for indigenous North American women. The name was changed by the United States Board of Geographic Names on September 8, 2022.

== See also ==
- List of lakes in California
