= Graveyard Peak =

Mountain in the American state of California

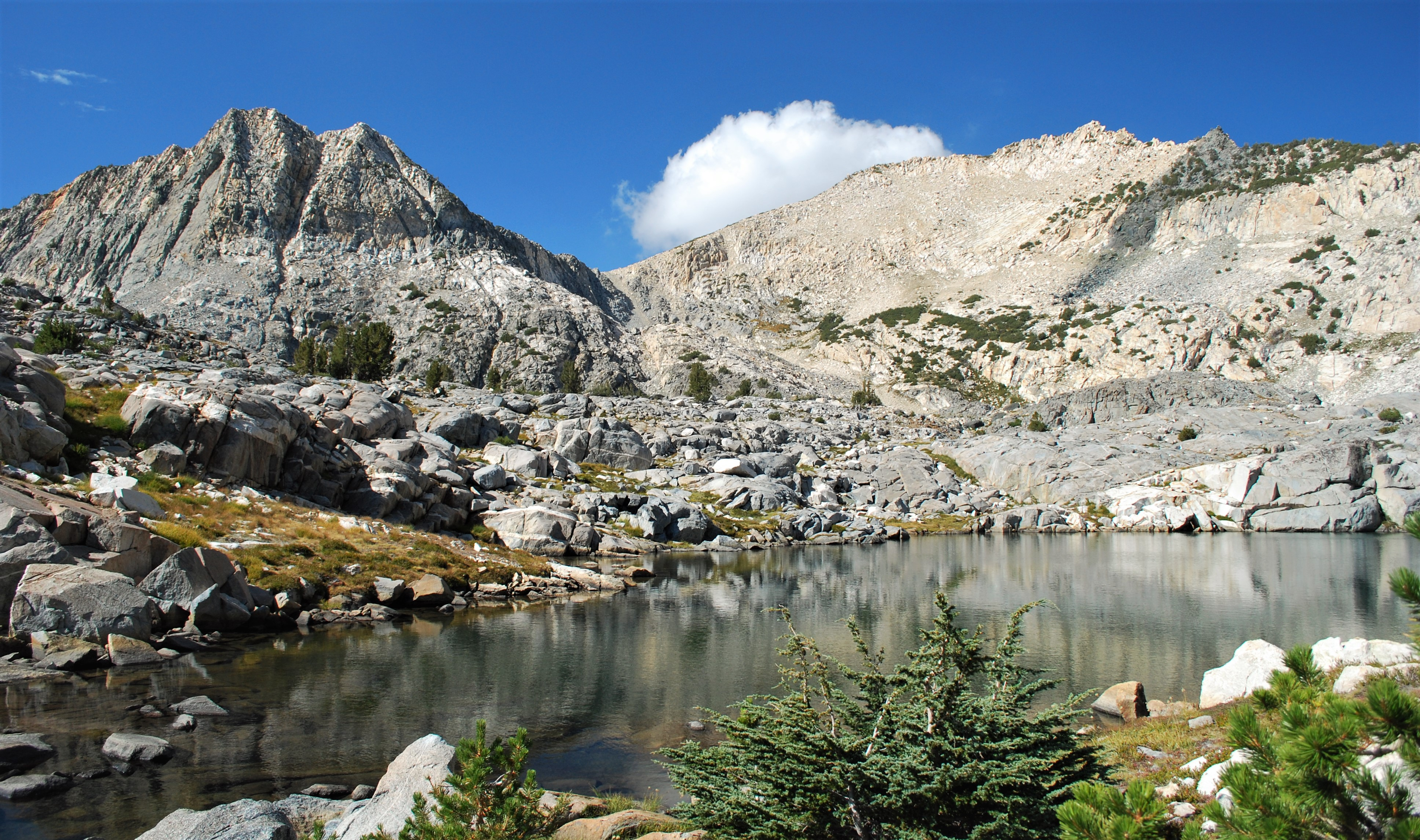
- East aspect (right)

Highest point
- Elevation: 11,539 ft (3,517 m)
- Prominence: 400 ft (122 m)
- Isolation: 1.59 mi (2.56 km)
- Coordinates: 37°27′05″N 118°59′24″W

Geography
- Location within California Location within the United States
- Country: United States
- State: California
- County: Fresno
- Protected area: John Muir Wilderness
- Parent range: Sierra Nevada
- Topo map: USGS Graveyard Peak

Geology
- Rock age: Cretaceous
- Mountain type: Fault block
- Rock type(s): Granodiorite, Leucogranite

Climbing
- First ascent: 1935
- Easiest route: class 2

Graveyard Peak is an 11,539-foot-elevation (3,517-meter) mountain summit located in the Sierra Nevada mountain range in Fresno County of northern California, United States. It is situated in the John Muir Wilderness, on land managed by Sierra National Forest. Graveyard Peak ranks as the 535th-highest summit in California, and topographic relief is significant as the south aspect rises over 2,300 feet (700 meters) above Devils Bathtub in approximately one mile. It is two miles southeast of Silver Peak, five miles north of Lake Thomas A Edison, and approximately 13 miles (21 km) south of the community of Mammoth Lakes. The peak is set on Silver Divide, so precipitation runoff from the north side of this mountain drains into Fish Creek which is a tributary of the San Joaquin River, and from the south slope to Lake Thomas A Edison. The peak is most easily reached out of Lake Thomas Edison.

== History ==
Graveyard Peak and Graveyard Lakes are named in association with nearby Graveyard Meadows which in turn was named for two sheepmen who were murdered and buried there. This landform's toponym has been officially adopted by the U.S. Board on Geographic Names.

The first ascent of the summit was made September 8, 1935, by William Stewart and David Parish.

== Climate ==
According to the Köppen climate classification system, Graveyard Peak is located in an alpine climate zone. Most weather fronts originate in the Pacific Ocean, and travel east toward the Sierra Nevada mountains. As fronts approach, they are forced upward by the peaks (orographic lift), causing them to drop their moisture in the form of rain or snowfall onto the range.

== Gallery ==
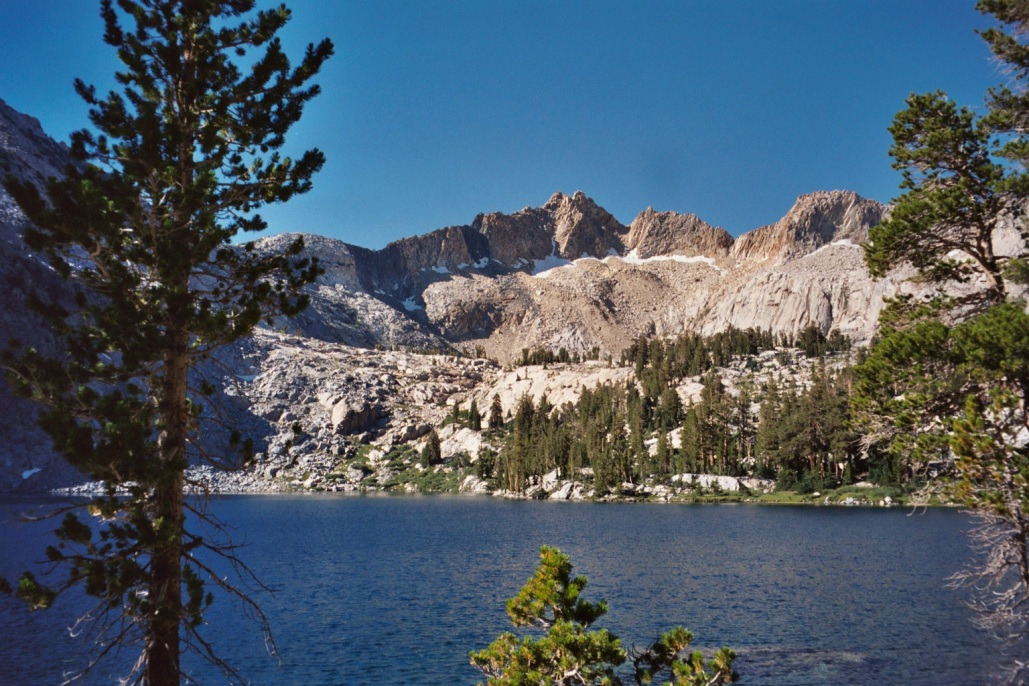
North aspect of Graveyard Peak from Peter Pande Lake

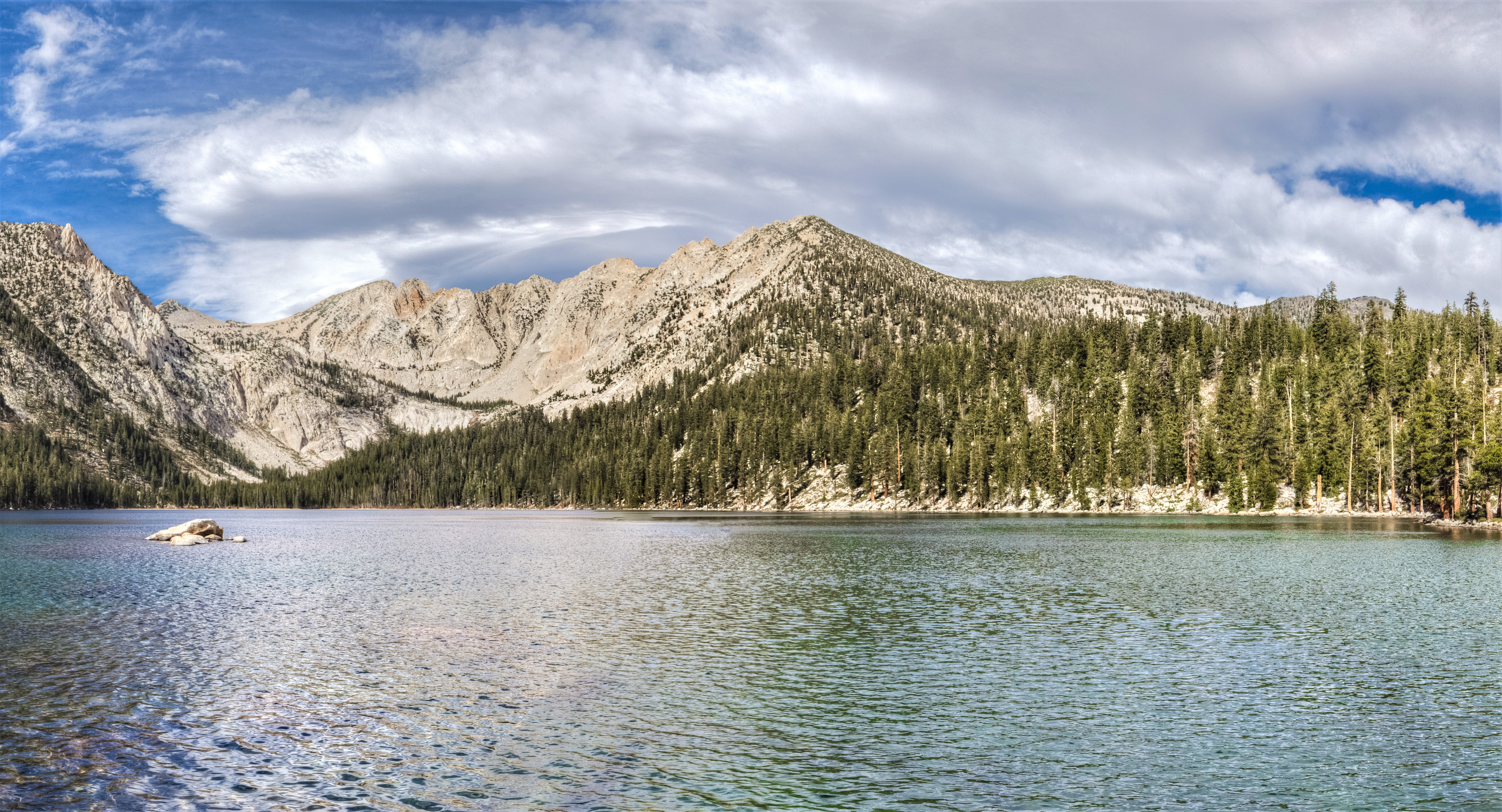
South aspect of Graveyard Peak seen from Devils Bathtub.

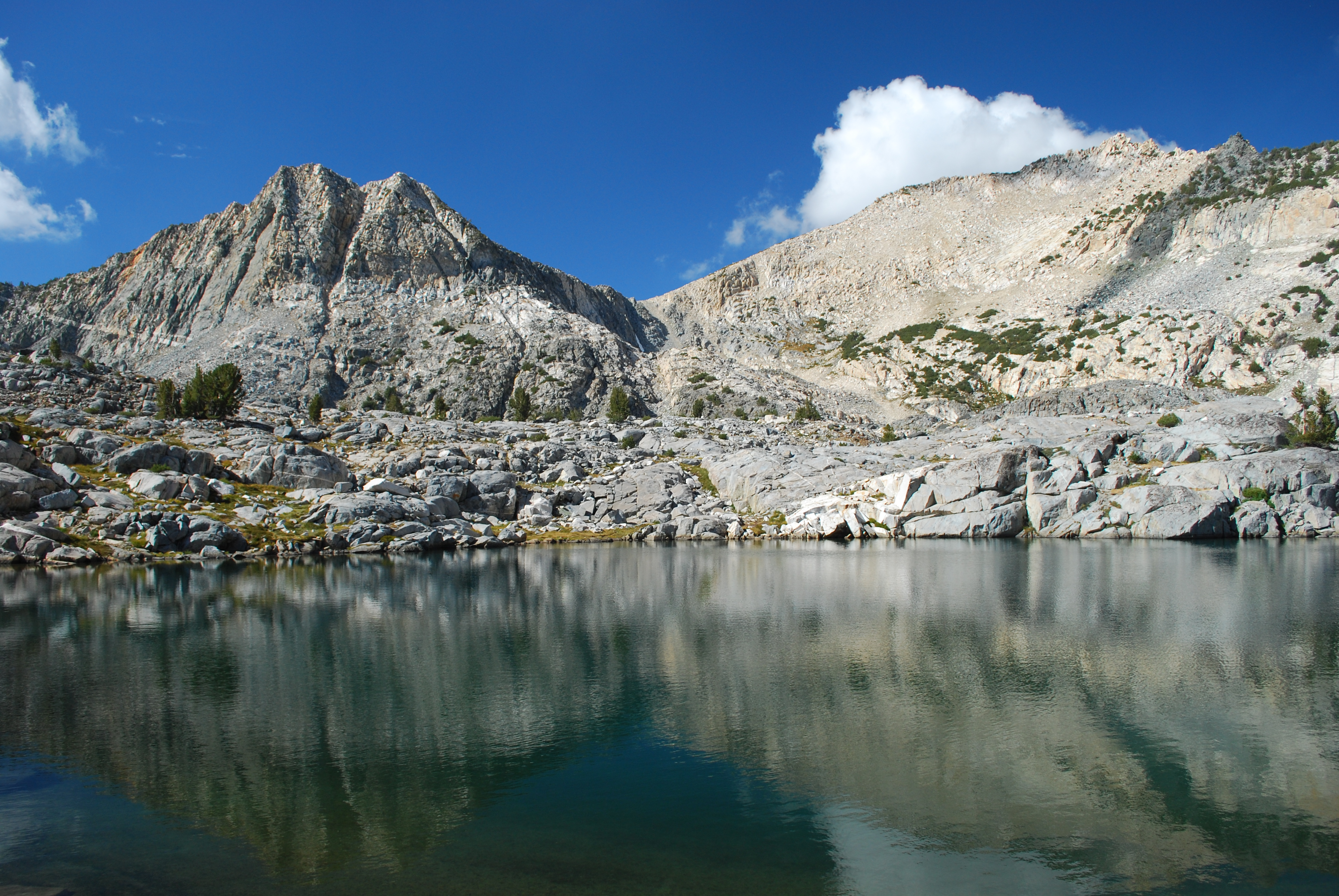
Graveyard Peak to right, east aspect from Graveyard Lakes

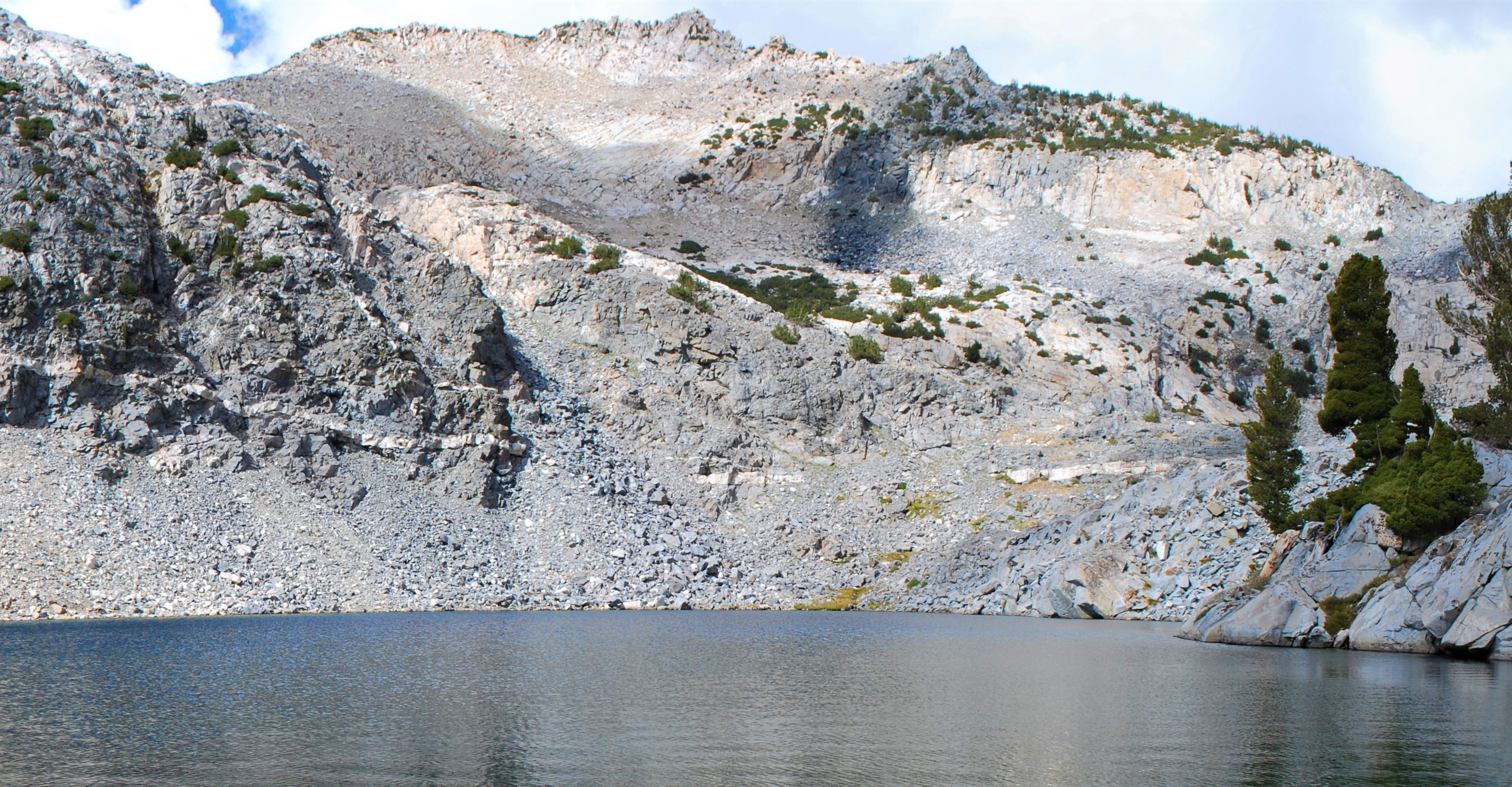
Graveyard Peak, east aspect

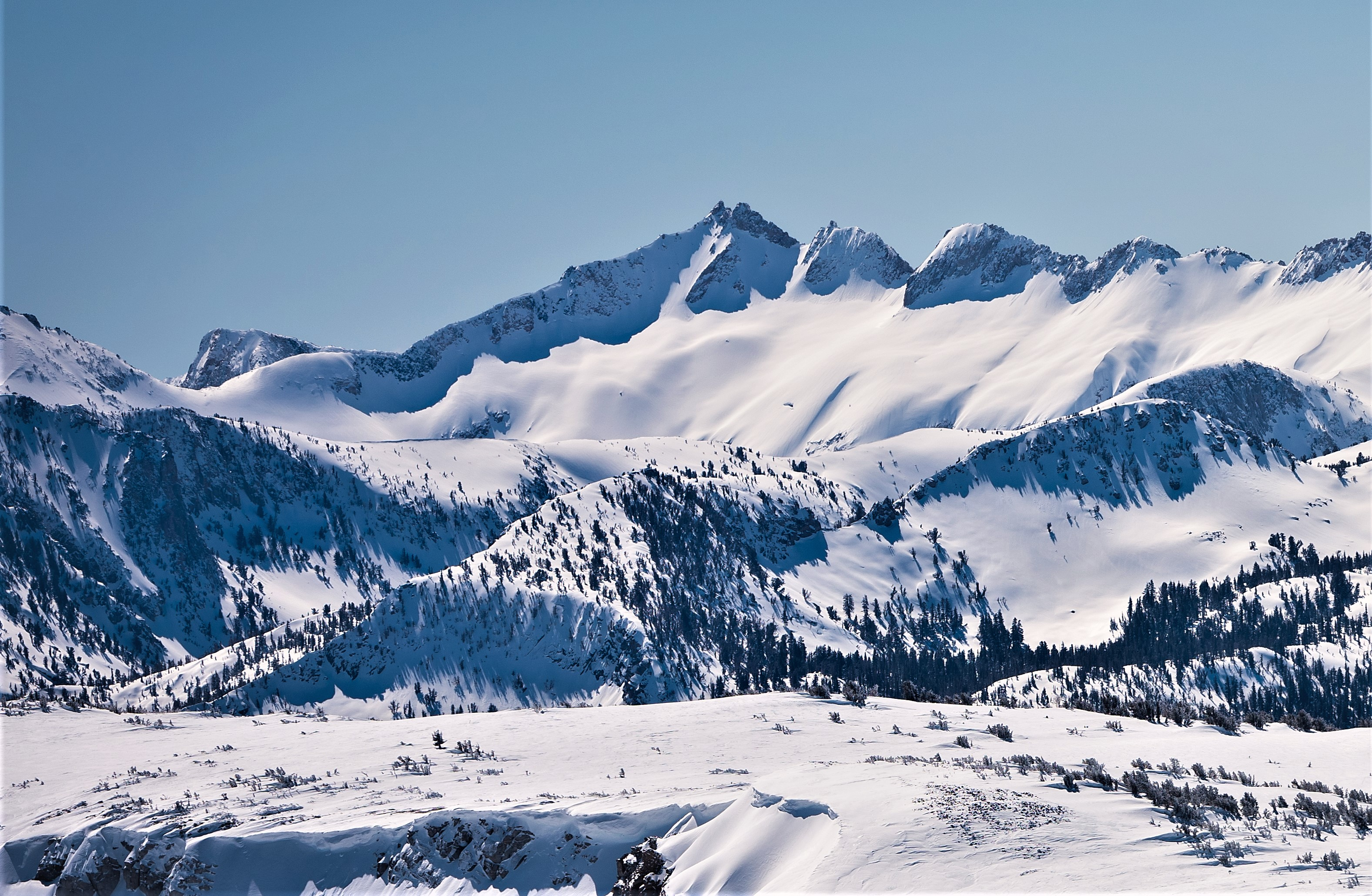
North aspect of Graveyard Peak seen from Mammoth Mountain

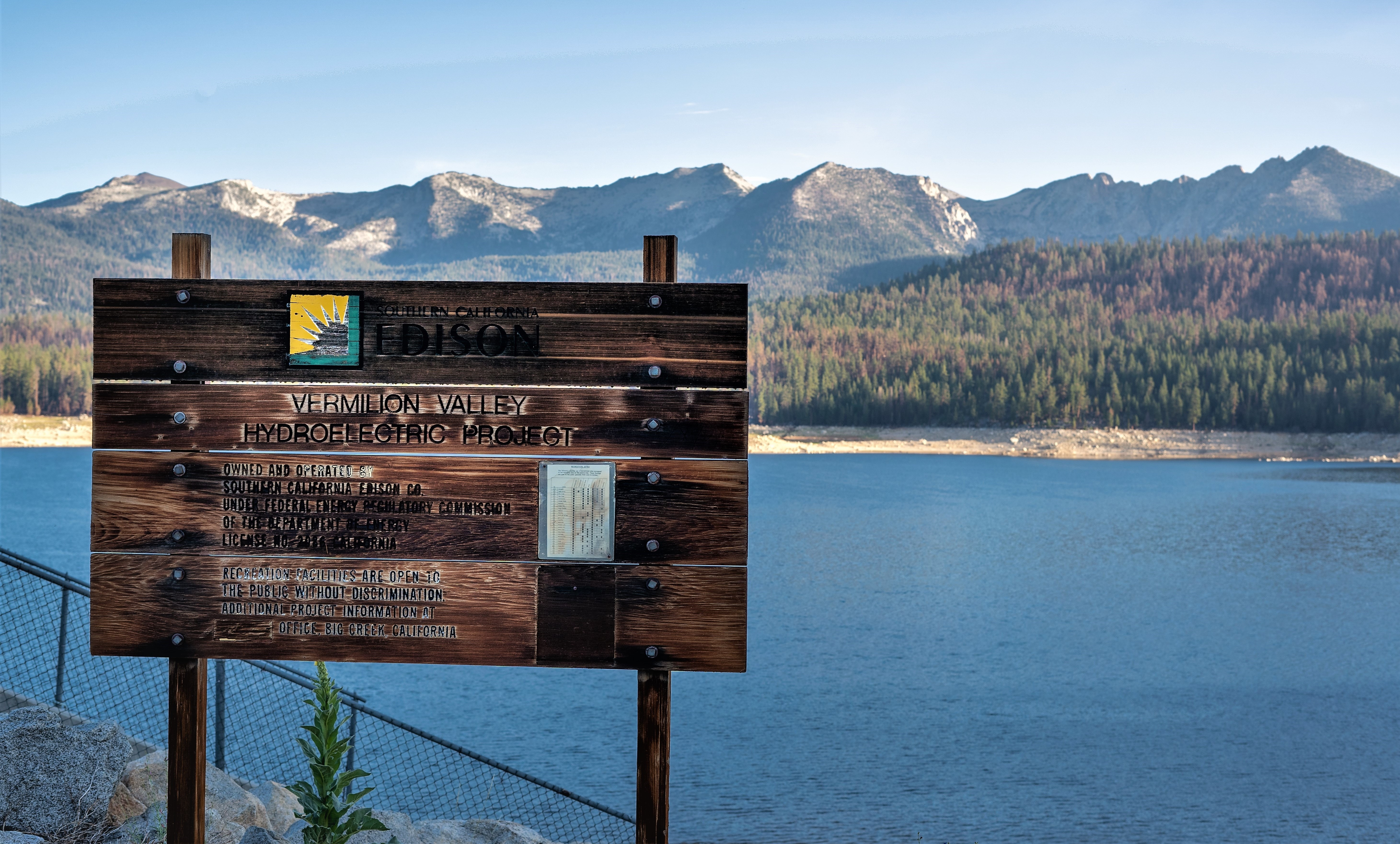
South aspect of Graveyard Peak (far right) seen from Lake Thomas A Edison

== See also ==
- Sierra Nevada
