= Recess Peak =

Mountain peak in California, United States

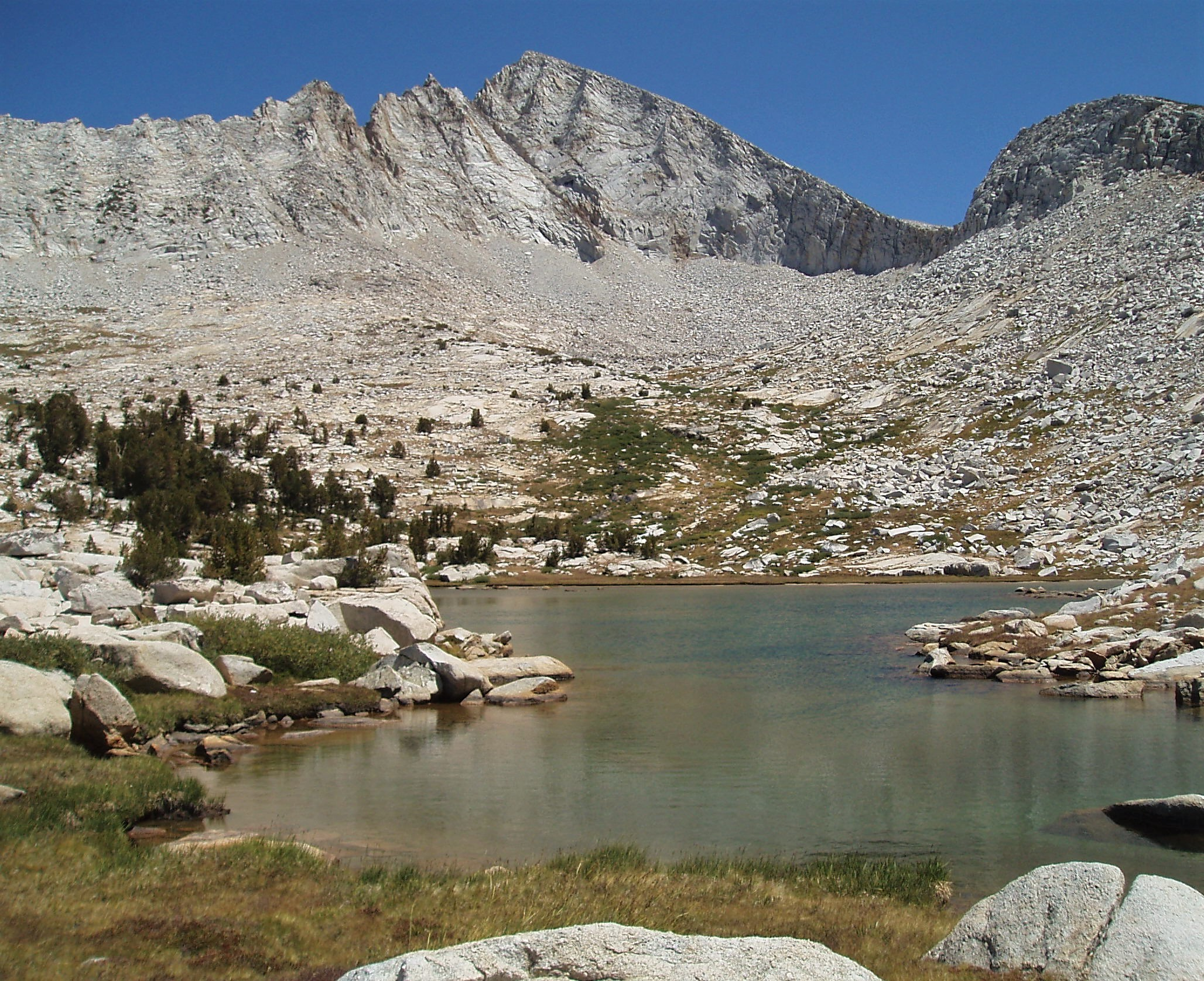
- North aspect

Highest point
- Elevation: 12,813 ft (3,905 m)
- Prominence: 813 ft (248 m)
- Parent peak: Mount Hilgard (13,361 ft)
- Isolation: 2.19 mi (3.52 km)
- Listing: Sierra Peaks Section
- Coordinates: 37°22′57″N 118°51′20″W

Geography
- Location within California Location within the United States
- Location: Fresno County; California, U.S.
- Parent range: Sierra Nevada
- Topo map: USGS Mount Abbot

Geology
- Rock type: granitic

Climbing
- First ascent: < 1937
- Easiest route: class 3

Recess Peak is a 12,813-foot-elevation (3,905-meter) mountain summit located west of the crest of the Sierra Nevada mountain range in Fresno County of northern California, United States. It is situated on Mono Divide in the John Muir Wilderness, on land managed by Sierra National Forest, and approximately six miles east of Lake Thomas A Edison. The nearest higher neighbor is Mount Hilgard, 2.2 miles (3.5 km) to the southeast. The John Muir Trail follows Bear Creek below the western slope of this remote peak. The summit is surrounded by arêtes and cirques, which were formed by glaciers in the past, most recently ending 13,000 years ago in the late Pleistocene.

== History ==
This mountain is so named because of its proximity to the First Recess of Mono Creek. Theodore S. Solomons discovered and named the First, Second, Third, and Fourth Recesses in 1894. The first ascent of the summit was made prior to 1937 by persons unknown.

== Climate ==
According to the Köppen climate classification system, Recess Peak is located in an alpine climate zone. Most weather fronts originate in the Pacific Ocean, and travel east toward the Sierra Nevada mountains. As fronts approach, they are forced upward by the peaks, causing them to drop their moisture in the form of rain or snowfall onto the range (orographic lift). Precipitation runoff from this mountain drains into the San Joaquin River watershed.

== Climbing ==
Established climbing routes on Recess Peak:

- Northeast arête – class 3
- Southeast arête – class 3
- Southwest arête – class 3

== See also ==
- List of mountain peaks of California
