= Silver Peak (Fresno County, California) =

Mountain in the American state of California

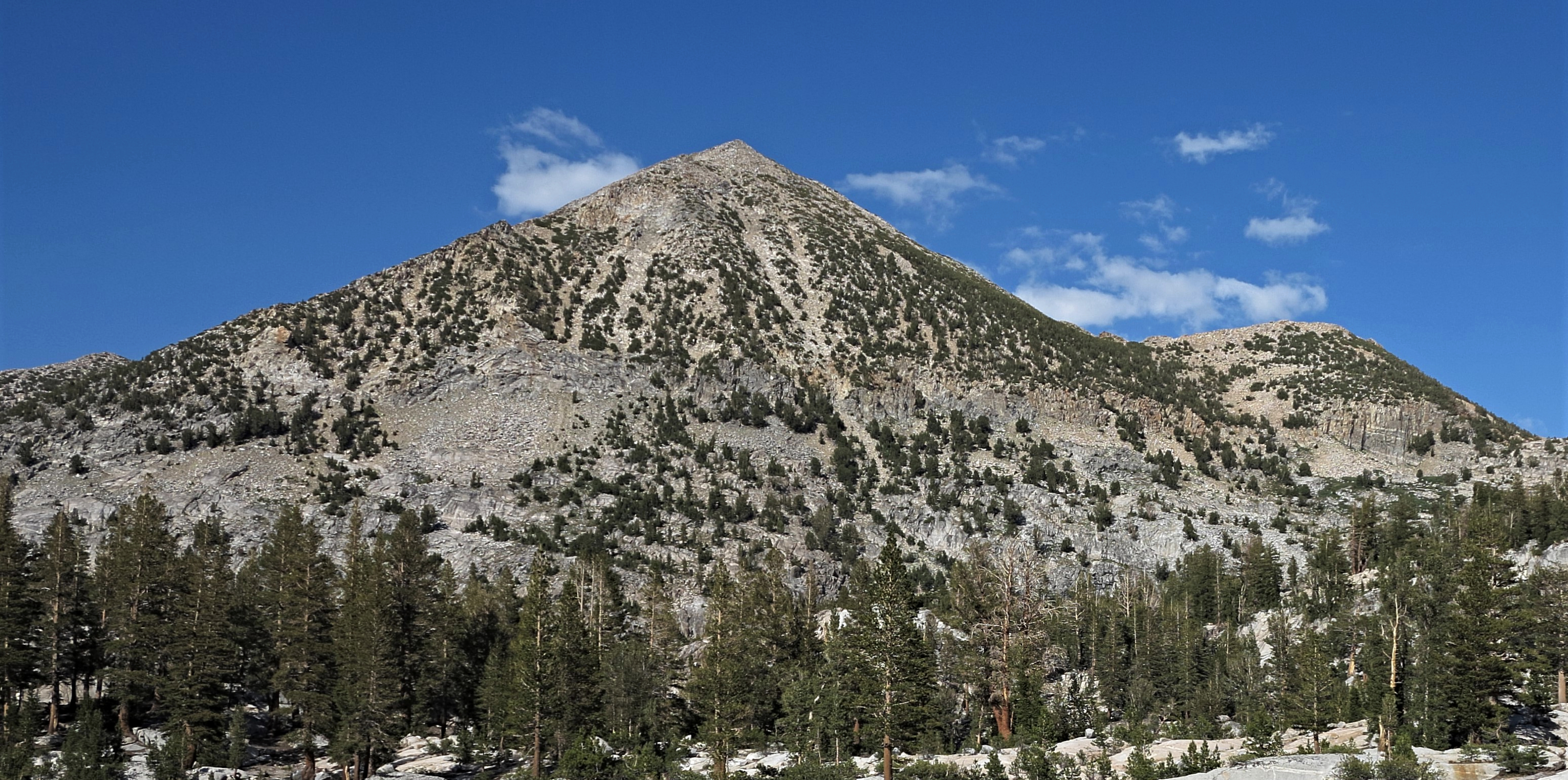
- Southwest aspect

Highest point
- Elevation: 11,878 ft (3,620 m)
- Prominence: 1,198 ft (365 m)
- Parent peak: Evon Benchmark (12,221 ft)
- Isolation: 6.14 mi (9.88 km)
- Listing: Sierra Peaks Section
- Coordinates: 37°28′11″N 119°01′16″W

Geography
- Location within California Location within the United States
- Location: Fresno County, California, U.S.
- Parent range: Sierra Nevada
- Topo map: USGS Sharktooth Peak

Geology
- Rock age: Cretaceous
- Mountain type: Fault block
- Rock type: Granodiorite

Climbing
- First ascent: <1937
- Easiest route: class 2

Silver Peak is an 11,878-foot-elevation (3,620-meter) mountain summit located in the Sierra Nevada mountain range in Fresno County, California, United States. It is set in the John Muir Wilderness, on land managed by Sierra National Forest. Silver Peak ranks as the 455th-highest summit in California, and topographic relief is significant as the east aspect rises nearly 2,300 feet (700 meters) above Beetlebug Lake in approximately one mile. It is six miles (9.7 km) north of Lake Thomas A Edison, and approximately 12 miles (19 km) south of the community of Mammoth Lakes. The peak is situated on Silver Divide, two miles northwest of Graveyard Peak. The first ascent of the summit was made prior to 1937 by an unknown party. Inclusion on the Sierra Peaks Section peakbagging list generates climbing interest.

== Climate ==
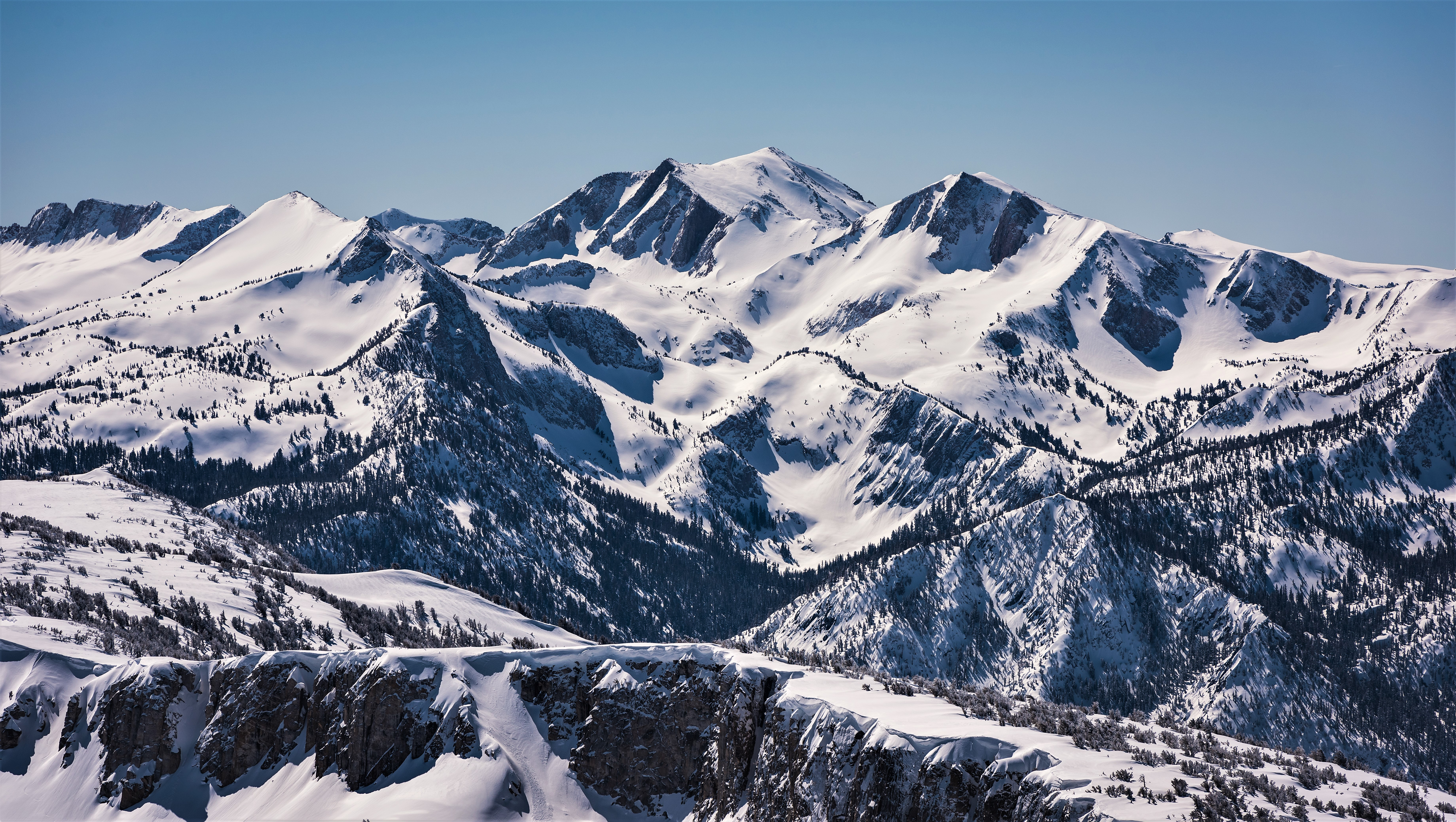
North aspect of Silver Peak centered in the distance, seen from Mammoth Mountain. Sharktooth Peak to immediate right.

According to the Köppen climate classification system, Silver Peak is located in an alpine climate zone. Most weather fronts originate in the Pacific Ocean, and travel east toward the Sierra Nevada mountains. As fronts approach, they are forced upward by the peaks (orographic lift), causing them to drop their moisture in the form of rain or snowfall onto the range. Precipitation runoff from the mountain drains into tributaries of the San Joaquin River.

== Etymology ==
Headwaters of Silver Creek originate from several lakes along the west slope of Silver Peak. Theodore Solomons so named the creek because of its silvery appearance, and the peak he named in association with the creek. This landform's toponym has been officially adopted by the U.S. Board on Geographic Names. There are 10 mountains in California with this same official name, and this one has the highest elevation.

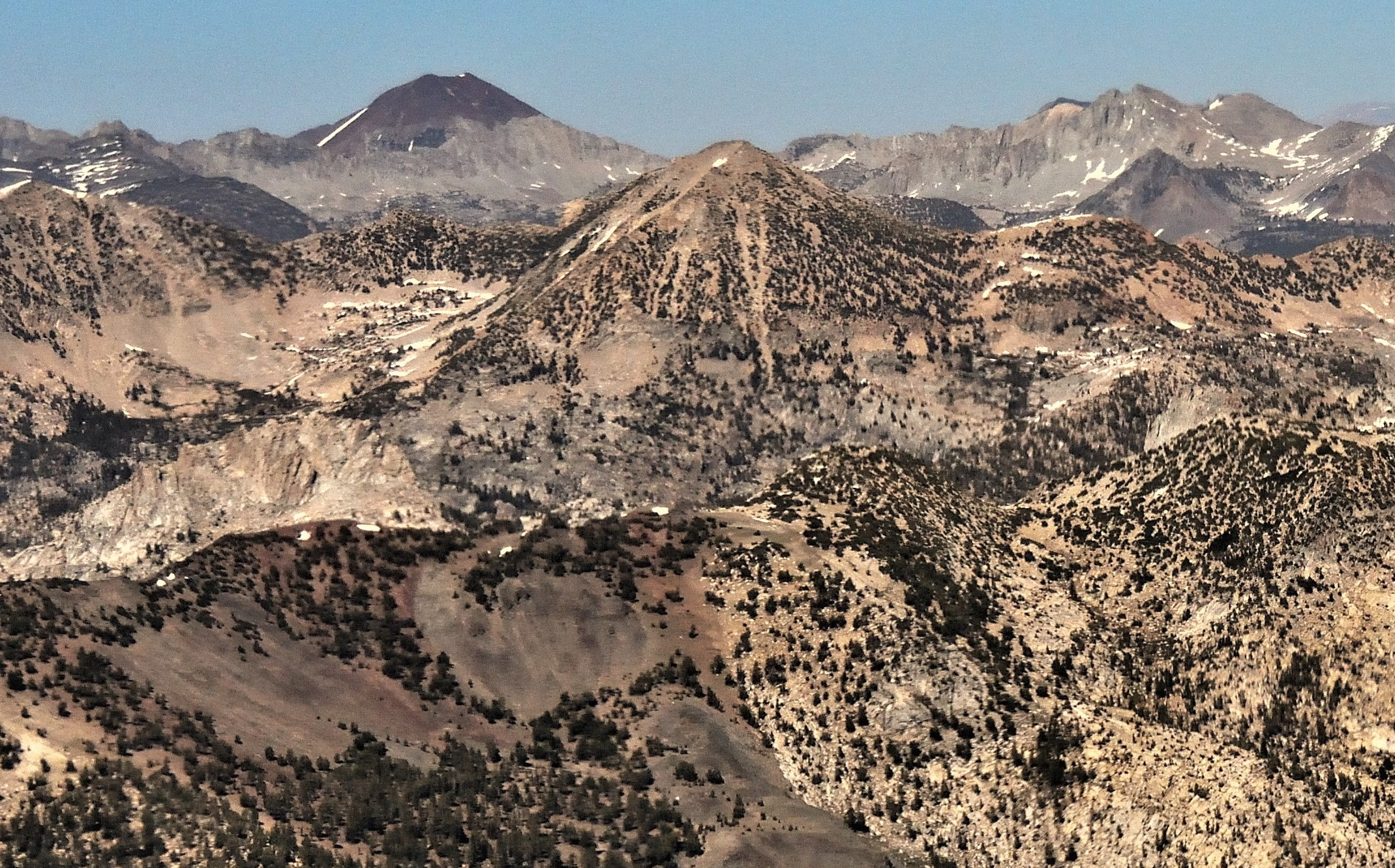
Aerial view of Silver Peak (center)

== See also ==
- Mount Izaak Walton
