= Disappointment Lake (California) =

Lake in California, United States

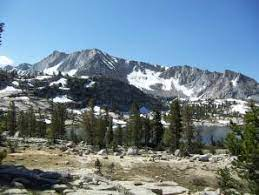

- Location within California Location within the United States
- Location: The Sierra Nevada Mountains, within Fresno County, California.
- Coordinates: 37.13988°N 118.81777°W
- Type: Alpine lake
- Part of: Red Mountain Basin
- Primary outflows: Fleming Creek
- Basin countries: United States
- Max. length: 1,247 ft (380 m)
- Max. width: 818 ft (249 m)
- Surface area: 7.59 hectares (18.8 acres)
- Shore length^{1}: 1.11 km (0.69 mi)
- Surface elevation: 3,153 metres (10,344 ft)
- ^{1} Shore length is not a well-defined measure.

Disappointment Lake is an Alpine lake located in the John Muir Wilderness, which is part of the Sierra Nevada mountain range in the United States. The lake is found by following the Hell for Sure Trail, which continues up to Hell for Sure Lake and Hell for Sure Pass. Mount Hutton can be found approximately 1.35 mi (2.17 km) to the southeast, and Red Mountain can be found approximately 1.13 mi (1.82 km) to the northeast.

== Nearby lakes ==
Disappointment Lake is part of the Red Mountain basin. Other lakes in this area include Hell for Sure Lake, Horseshoe Lake, and Devil's Punchbowl.

== See also ==
- List of lakes in California
