= Mount Gabb =

Mountain in California, United States

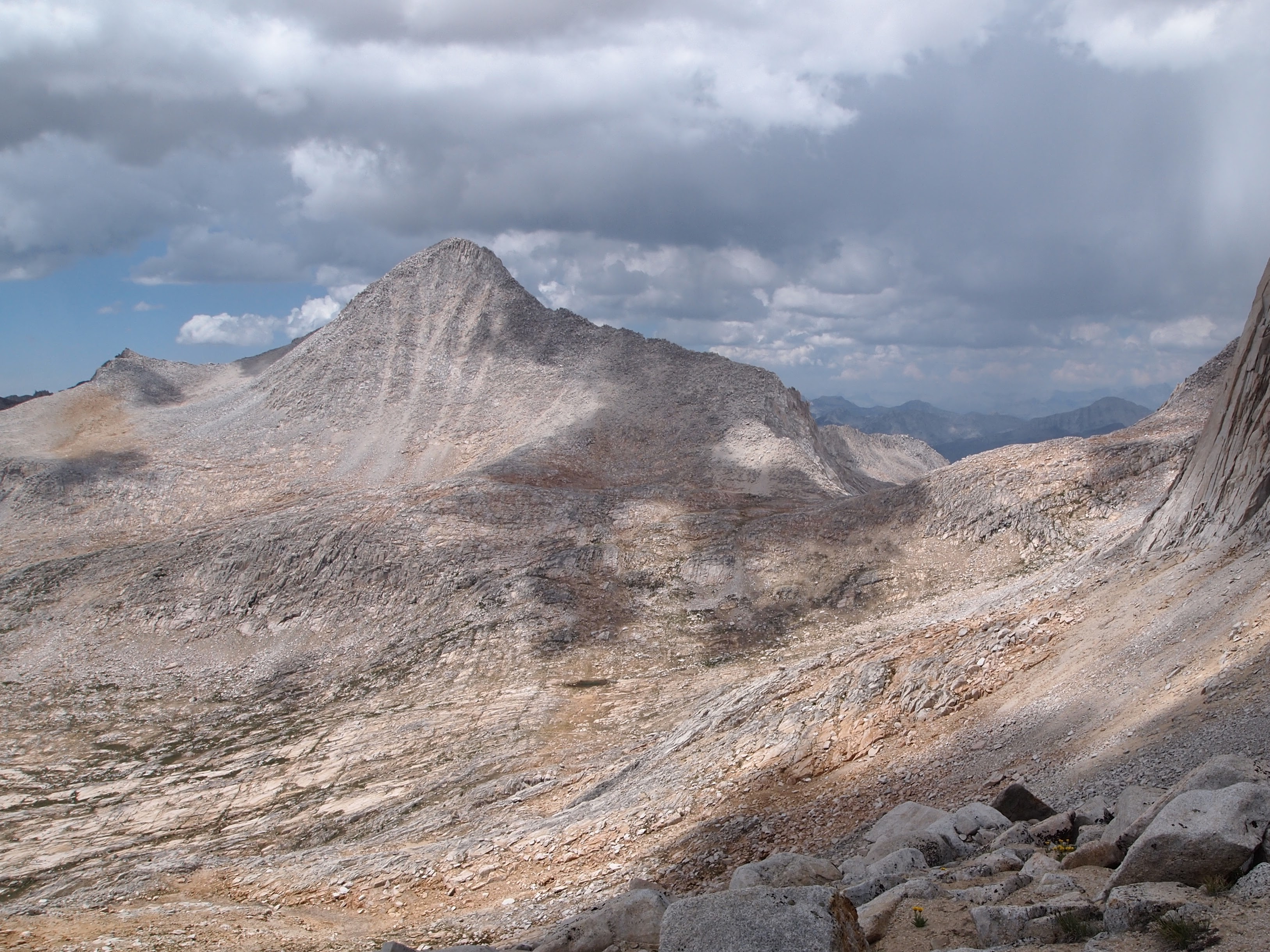
- Mount Gabb as viewed from the east

Highest point
- Elevation: 13,747 ft (4,190 m)
- Prominence: 2,581 ft (787 m)
- Listing: California highest major peaks 11th
- Coordinates: 37°22′36″N 118°48′09″W

Geography
- Location within California Location within the United States
- Location: Fresno County, California, U.S.
- Parent range: Sierra Nevada
- Topo map: USGS Mount Abbot

Climbing
- First ascent: June 1917 by A. L. Jordan and H. H. Bliss

Mount Gabb (13,747 feet (4,190 m)) is in the central Sierra Nevada in the U.S. state of California. Mount Gabb is in the John Muir Wilderness of Sierra National Forest and is named after William More Gabb, a paleontologist and member of the Whitney Survey.

The ascent up the south face is a class 2-3 climb from Lake Italy. Alternatively, the peak can be accessed from Upper Mills Creek Lake, and is a class 2 climb.
