= Dingleberry Lake =

Lake in the state of California, United States

- Location within California
- Location: John Muir Wilderness / Inyo National Forest / Inyo County, California
- Coordinates: 37°10′56″N 118°38′15″W
- Type: Lake
- Surface area: 5.098 acres (2.063 ha)
- Surface elevation: 10,495 ft (3,199 m)

Dingleberry Lake is a natural lake in Inyo County, California, in the United States. The lake was so named on account of dingleberries hanging on the rear of sheep in the area.

The Sabrina Lake Trail leads hikers to Dingleberry Lake. Dingleberry Lake is a popular camping site. The lake contains a population of brook trout.

== See also ==
- List of lakes in California
