= Lake of the Lone Indian =

Lake in the state of California, United States

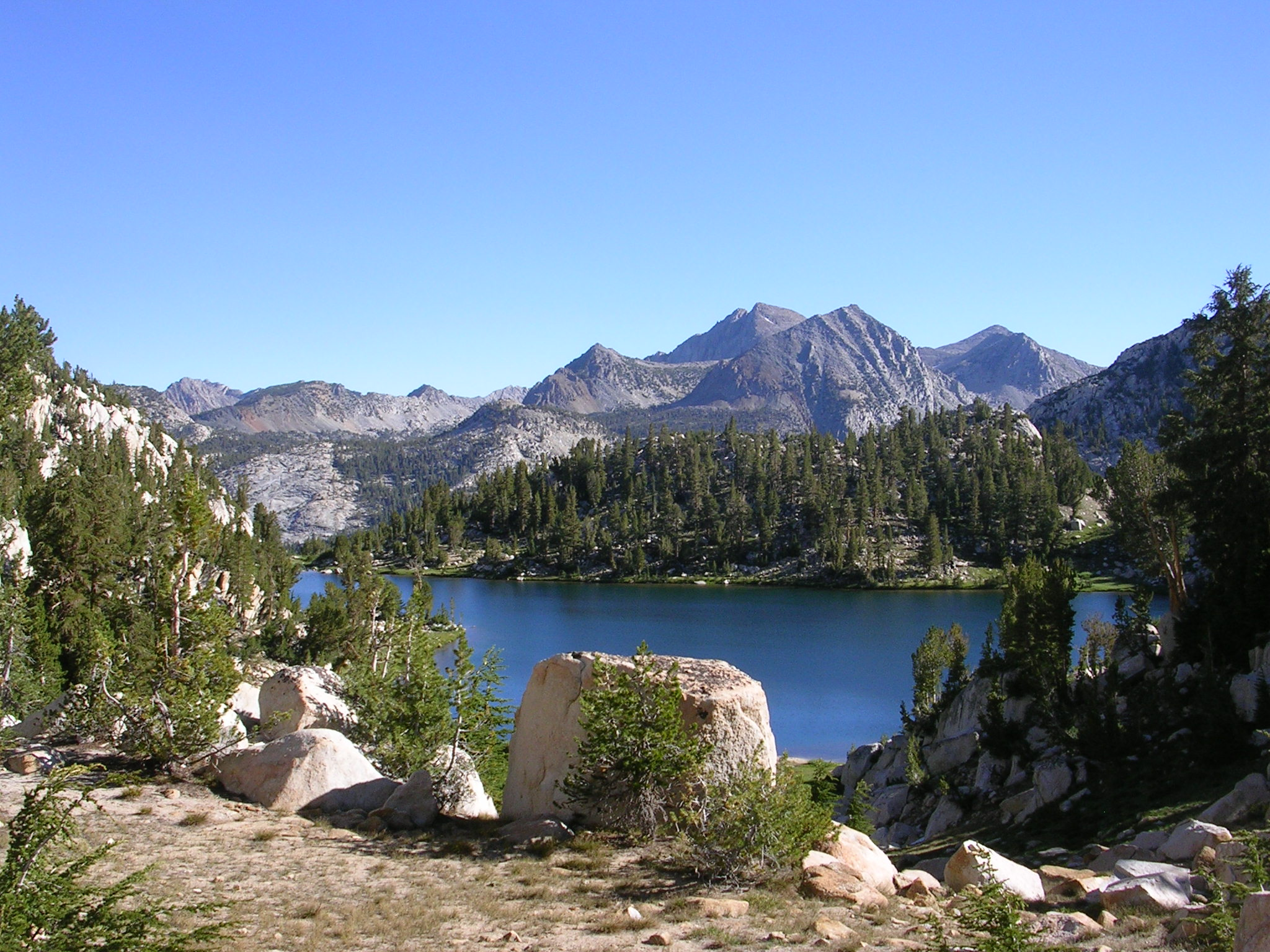
- Lake of the Lone Indian

- Location within California Location within the United States
- Location: John Muir Wilderness, Sierra Nevada, Fresno County, California, United States
- Coordinates: 37°28′32″N 118°56′14″W
- Type: Natural freshwater lake
- Primary outflows: An intermittent stream that in about a mile or so becomes Fish Creek
- Basin countries: United States
- Max. length: 1,365 ft (416 m)
- Max. width: 780 ft (240 m)
- Surface elevation: 10,259 ft (3,127 m)

Lake of the Lone Indian is a small lake in the eastern Sierra Nevada, near the John Muir Trail and Pacific Crest Trail in John Muir Wilderness. The outflow of Lake of the Lone Indian becomes Fish Creek, which eventually joins the Middle Fork of the San Joaquin River.

The lake was named in 1902 because the mountain above the lake appears to have a face of a Native American.

== See also ==
- List of lakes in California
