= Virginia Lake =

Virginia Lake may refer to:

- Virginia Lake, a character in the TV series UFO
- Virginia Lake (Sawtooth Wilderness), a glacial lake in Boise County, Idaho, United States
- Virginia Lakes, a cluster of lakes in California, United States
- Rotokawau Virginia Lake, a lake in Whanganui, New Zealand

== See also ==
- Lake Virginia (disambiguation)
