= Lake Italy =

Lake in California, United States

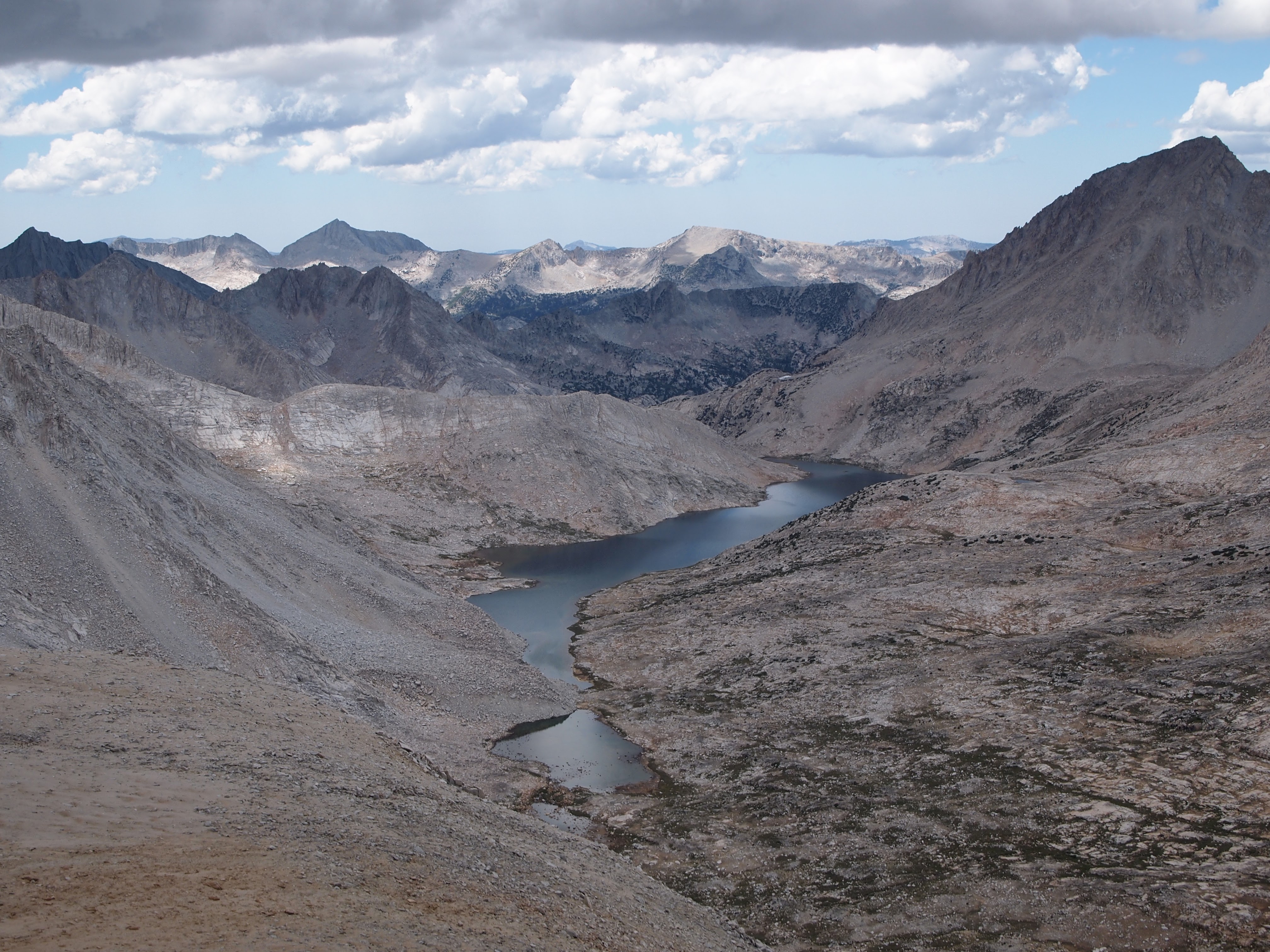
- Lake Italy viewed from near Bear Creek Spire with Mount Hilgard to right.

- Location within California Location within the United States
- Location: John Muir Wilderness, Fresno County, California, United States
- Coordinates: 37.3584°N 118.8085°W
- Surface elevation: 11,207 ft (3,416 m)

Lake Italy is a lake in the John Muir Wilderness of the Sierra Nevada Mountains of California. The lake is accessible via trail over Italy Pass or as an offshoot of the John Muir Trail. It was named by the USGS because its shape is similar to that of Italy.
