= USS Whippet (IX-129) =

History

United States
- Laid down: 31 October 1943
- Launched: 15 December 1943
- Commissioned: 14 January 1944
- Decommissioned: 1 July 1946
- Fate: Disposed of by the WSA

General characteristics
- Displacement: 15,425 tons
- Length: 441 ft 6 in (134.57 m)
- Beam: 57 ft (17 m)
- Draught: 27 feet 8 7/8 inches
- Speed: 11 knots
- Complement: 109 officers and men
- Armament: 1 × 5-inch 38 caliber dual purpose gun; 1 × 3 in (76 mm) gun; 8 × 20 mm cannons

The second USS Whippet (IX-129), an Armadillo-class tanker designated an unclassified miscellaneous vessel, was the second ship of the United States Navy to be named for the whippet. Originally laid down as Eugene W. Hilgard, her keel was laid on 31 October 1943 at New Orleans, Louisiana, by the Delta Shipbuilding Company under a Maritime Commission contract (MCE hull 1933). She was launched on 15 December 1943 sponsored by Mrs. Will Camp Sealy, delivered to the Navy on 13 January 1944, renamed Whippet and designated IX-129, and commissioned on 14 January 1944.

Following shakedown out of New Orleans, Whippet got underway late in January for duty in the South Pacific. She arrived at Bora Bora in the Society Islands on 27 February and remained there until 9 March when she continued her voyage. Two days later, the ship arrived at Funafuti and served there as station tanker until the beginning of the second week in May. On 10 May, Whippet headed for Oahu and, after a nine-day voyage, arrived in Pearl Harbor. Late in June, she had returned west of the International Date Line, arriving at Eniwetok on 24 June. For the next nine months, she served as station tanker at various forward bases in the Central Pacific, including Eniwetok during the Marianas campaign and Ulithi during the struggles for the Palau Islands and the Philippines. By the spring of 1945, the tanker had moved to Saipan in the Mariana Islands to prepare for the Okinawa assault.

On 27 March, she departed Saipan and, on 2 April, entered the anchorage at Kerama Retto in the Ryukyu Islands to the west of Okinawa. There she remained, serving again as station tanker until well after organized resistance on Okinawa ceased. On 25 July, she departed the Ryukyus and steamed via Ulithi to Leyte where she arrived on 7 August.

Whippet remained there until 12 October when she got underway for Manila. The tanker arrived at Manila the following day and served there until near the end of the second month of 1946. On 24 February, she returned to Leyte briefly before continuing on to the Marianas. After spending the month of March in the Marianas, she returned to the Philippines at Subic Bay at the end of the second week in April. The ship stayed there until the end of the month at which time she received orders to return to the United States at Norfolk, Virginia. She stopped at Pearl Harbor from 7 May to 20 May and arrived in San Francisco, California on 29 May. Instead of returning to Norfolk, however, she remained on the West Coast. On 1 July 1946, she was decommissioned at San Francisco, and returned to the War Shipping Administration for layup with the National Defense Reserve Fleet at Suisun Bay, California. Her name was struck from the Naval Vessel Register on 19 July 1946.

Whippet received two battle stars for World War II service
