= Mount Hutton (California) =

Mountain in Sierra National Forrest, California, USA

- Location within California

Highest point
- Elevation: 11,990 ft (3,650 m)
- Prominence: 470 ft (140 m)
- Isolation: 1.98 mi (3.19 km)
- Coordinates: 36°7′33″N 118°47′58″W

Naming
- Etymology: James Hutton

Geography
- Country: United States
- State: California
- County: Fresno
- Protected area: Sierra National Forest
- Parent range: Sierra Nevada

Mount Hutton is a 11,990-foot (3,650 m) summit located in the John Muir Wilderness area of the Sierra National Forest. A nearby smaller peak of this mountain is called Blackcap Mountain. In 1973 this mountain was named for James Hutton whose work laid the foundation for the modern field of geology.

== See also ==
- List of mountain peaks of California
