= Lake Virginia (California) =

Lake in the state of California, United States

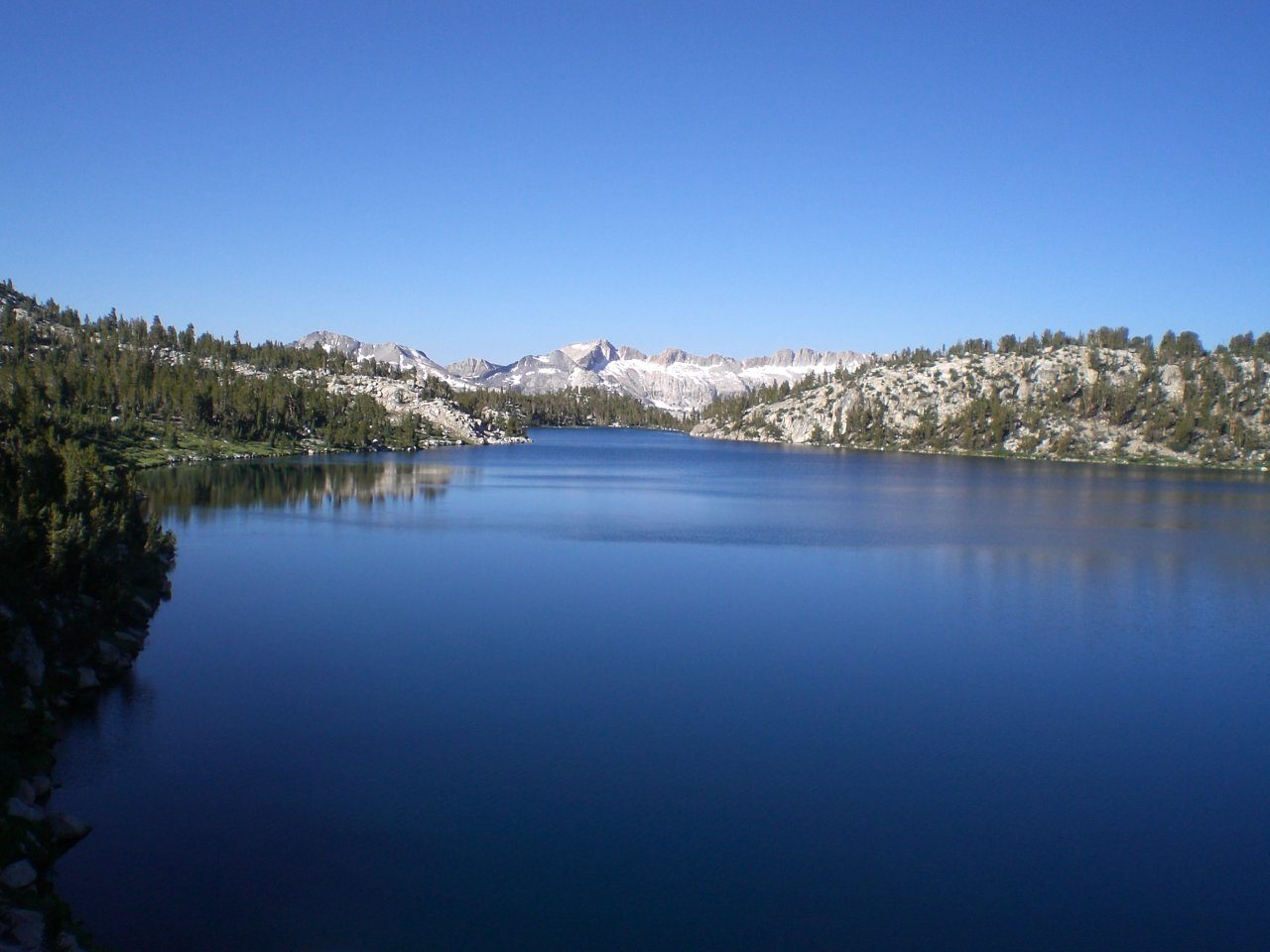

- Location within California Location within the United States
- Location: John Muir Wilderness, Sierra Nevada, Fresno County, California, United States
- Coordinates: 37°30′44″N 118°56′07″W
- Primary outflows: Fish Creek
- Basin countries: United States
- Surface elevation: 10,344 ft (3,153 m)

Lake Virginia is a lake located in the Sierra Nevada (John Muir Wilderness) in Fresno County, California. It drains into Fish Creek, in the Cascade Valley. The John Muir Trail passes along its northern shore. It is not to be confused with Virginia Lakes, a cluster of lakes lying to the north.

== See also ==
- List of lakes in California
