= Mount Izaak Walton =

Mountain in the state of California

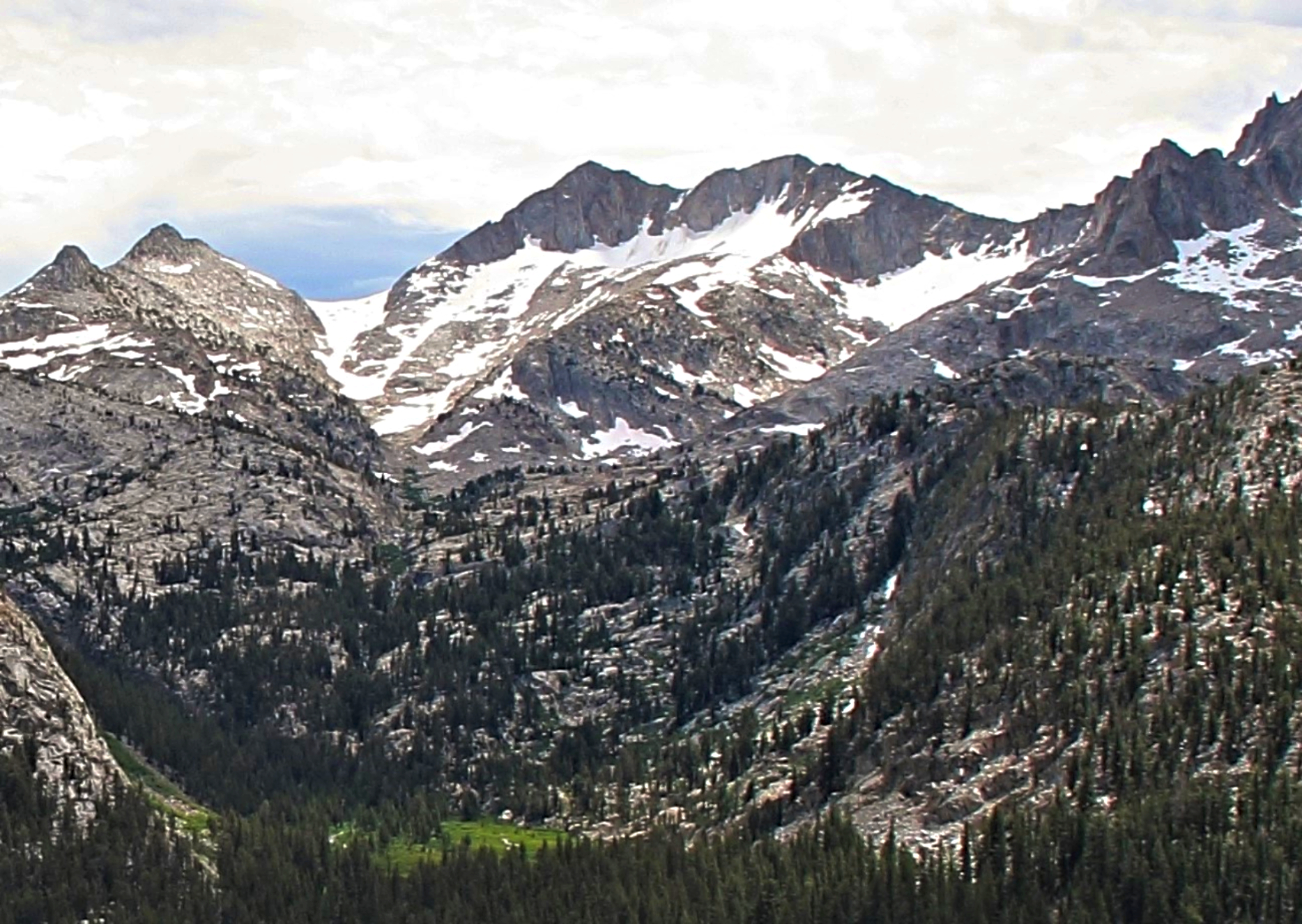
- North aspect

Highest point
- Elevation: 12,077 ft (3,681 m)
- Prominence: 477 ft (145 m)
- Parent peak: Evon Benchmark (12,221 ft)
- Isolation: 1.12 mi (1.80 km)
- Listing: Sierra Peaks Section
- Coordinates: 37°28′12″N 118°53′24″W

Naming
- Etymology: Izaak Walton

Geography
- Location within California Location within the United States
- Country: United States
- State: California
- County: Fresno
- Protected area: John Muir Wilderness
- Parent range: Sierra Nevada
- Topo map: USGS Graveyard Peak

Geology
- Rock age: Cretaceous
- Mountain type: Horn
- Rock type: Granodiorite

Climbing
- First ascent: 1971
- Easiest route: class 2 Southwest slope

Mount Izaak Walton is a 12,077-foot-elevation (3,681-meter) mountain summit located in the Sierra Nevada mountain range in Fresno County of northern California, United States. It is situated in the John Muir Wilderness, on land managed by Sierra National Forest. Mount Izaak Walton ranks as the 404th-highest summit in California. Topographic relief is significant as the northwest aspect rises 1,800 feet (550 meters) above Izaak Walton Lake in approximately one mile. It is six miles northeast of Lake Thomas A Edison, and approximately 14 miles (23 km) south-southeast of the community of Mammoth Lakes. The peak is set on Silver Divide, so precipitation runoff from the north side of this mountain drains into Fish Creek which is a tributary of the San Joaquin River, and from the south slope to Mono Creek, also a tributary of the San Joaquin.

== History ==
This mountain's toponym was proposed in 1919 by Francis P. Farquhar and officially adopted in 1926 by the U.S. Board on Geographic Names to honor Izaak Walton (1593–1683), an English writer best known as the author of The Compleat Angler. The connection being that the mountain is set at the head of Fish Creek and Izaak Walton was an avid fisherman.

The first ascent of the summit was made July 5, 1971, by Andy Smatko, Bill Schuler, and Ed Treacy.

== Climate ==
According to the Köppen climate classification system, Mount Izaak Walton is located in an alpine climate zone. Most weather fronts originate in the Pacific Ocean, and travel east toward the Sierra Nevada mountains. As fronts approach, they are forced upward by the peaks (orographic lift), causing them to drop their moisture in the form of rain or snowfall onto the range.

== Gallery ==
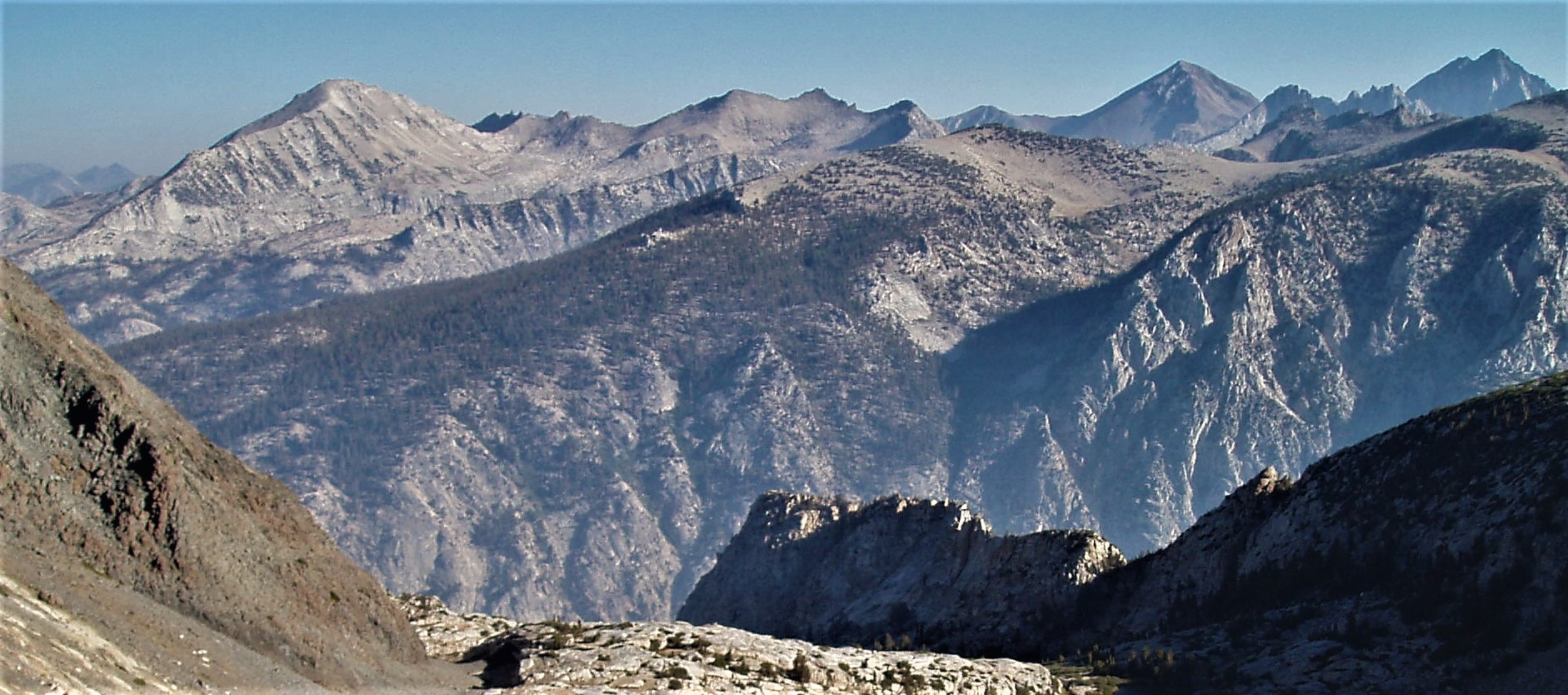
South aspect of Mt. Izaak Walton centered at top. To left is parent Evon Benchmark, and to right are Red and White Mountain, Red Slate Mountain.

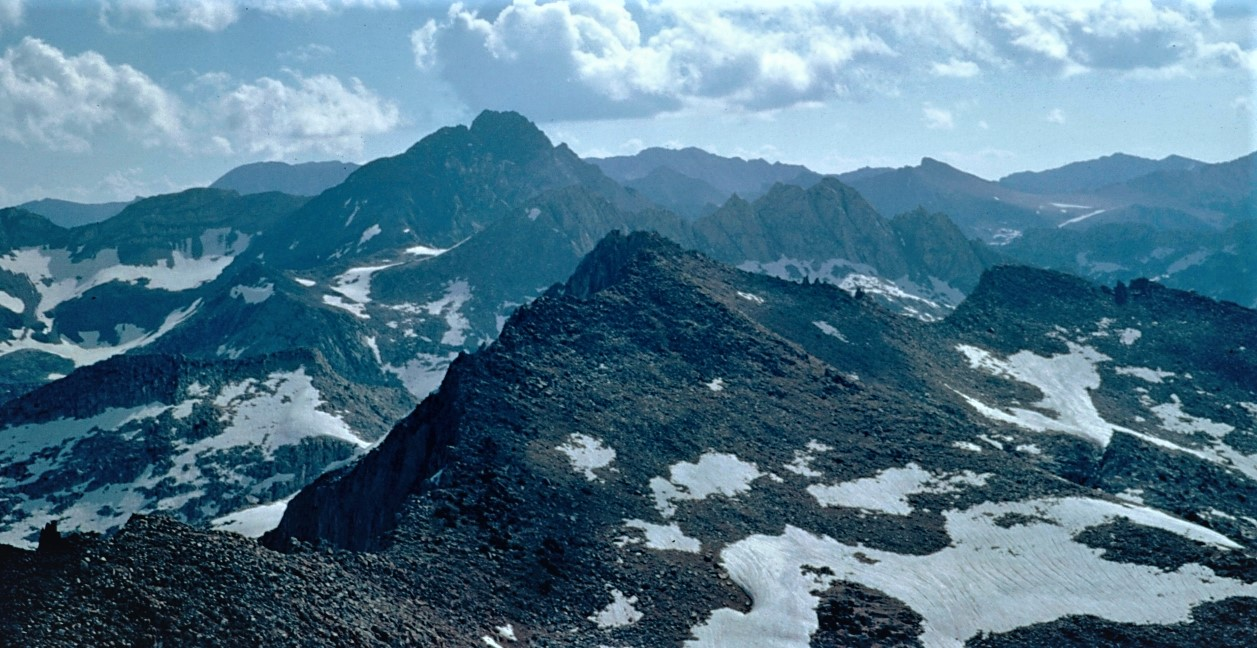
Top of Mount Izaak Walton (centered, foreground) with Red and White Mountain (left of center). View from Evon Benchmark.

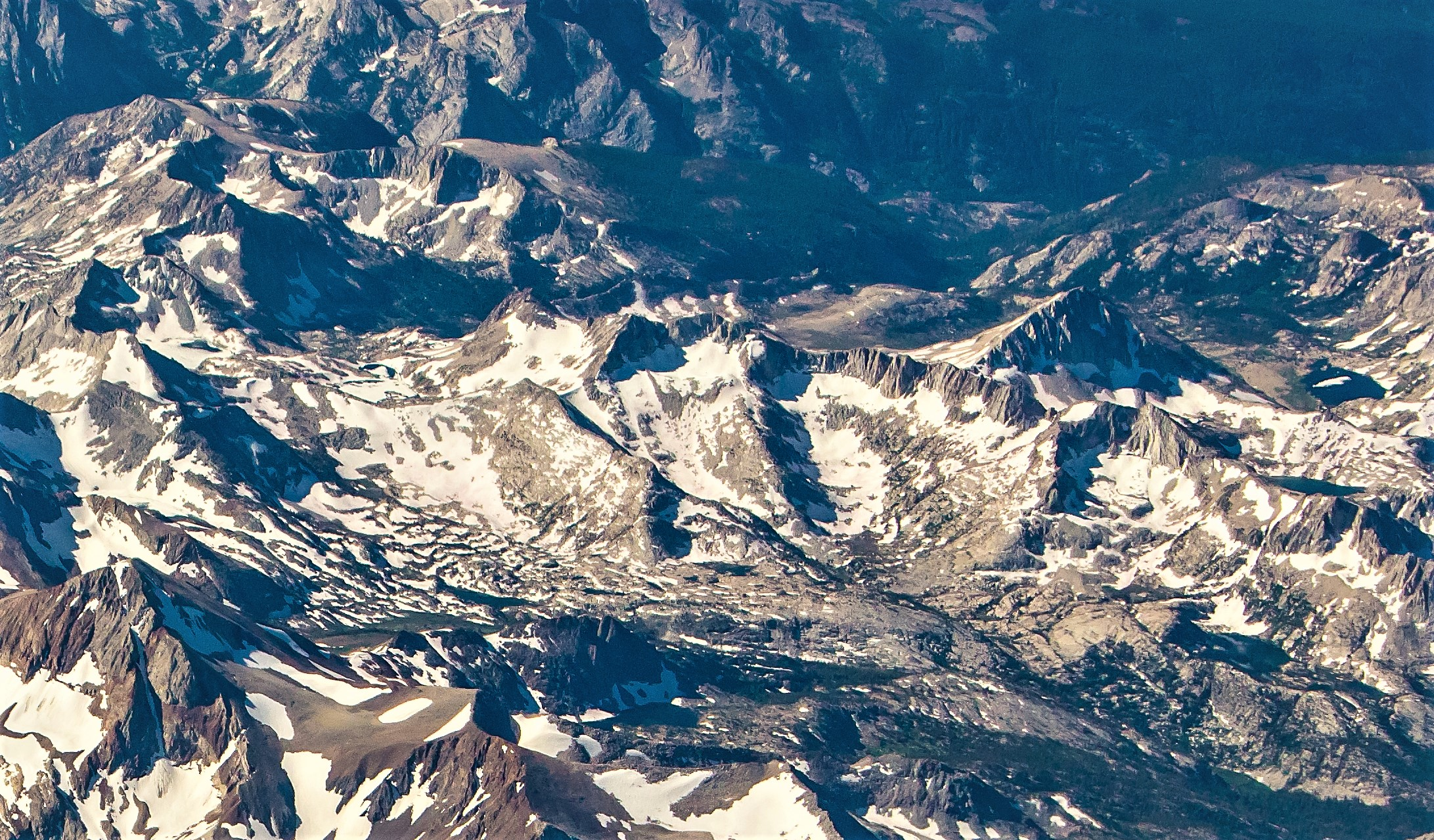
Aerial view of Mount Izaak Walton centered. Camera pointed south.

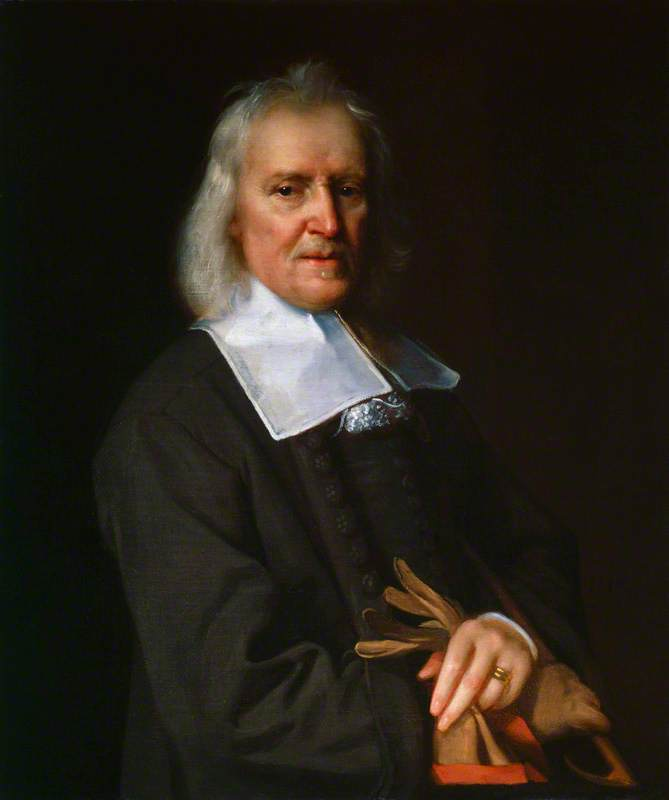
Izaak Walton

== See also ==
- Sierra Nevada
