= John Muir Wilderness =

Protected area in the Sierra Nevada of California, US

- IUCN category Ib (wilderness area)
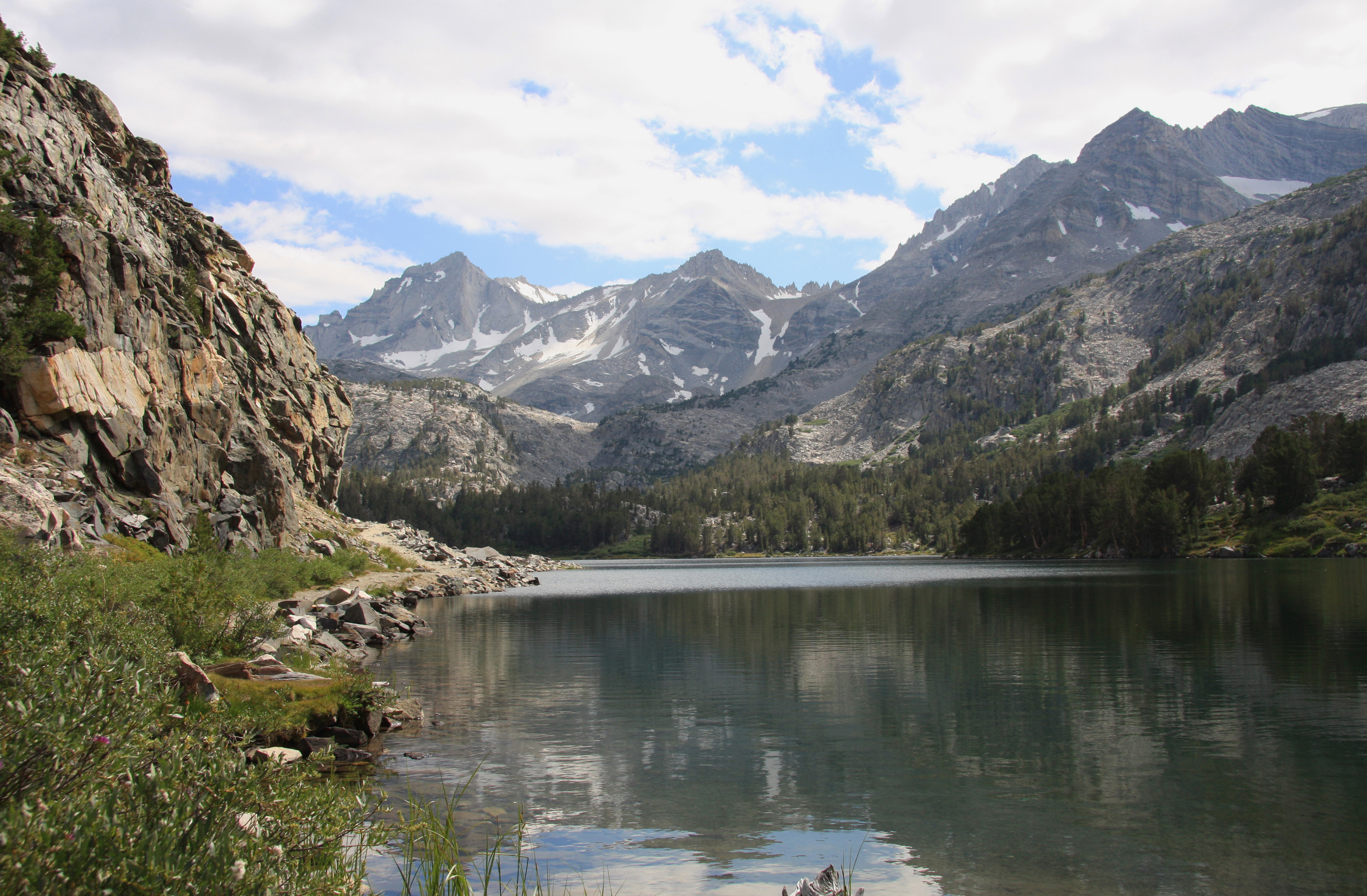
- Long Lake in Little Lakes Valley, John Muir Wilderness

- Location within California Location within the United States
- Interactive map of John Muir Wilderness
- Location: Fresno / Inyo / Mono / Madera counties, California, United States
- Nearest city: Fresno, CA
- Coordinates: 36°58′33″N 118°48′42″W
- Area: 652,793 acres (2,641.76 km^{2})
- Established: January 1, 1964
- Governing body: U.S. Forest Service

The John Muir Wilderness is a wilderness area that extends along the crest of the Sierra Nevada of California for 90 miles (140 km), in the Inyo and Sierra National Forests. Established in 1964 by the Wilderness Act and named for naturalist John Muir, it encompasses 652,793 acres (2,641.76 km^{2}). The wilderness lies along the eastern escarpment of the Sierra from near Mammoth Lakes and Devils Postpile National Monument in the north, to Cottonwood Pass near Mount Whitney in the south. The wilderness area also spans the Sierra crest north of Kings Canyon National Park, and extends on the west side of the park down to the Monarch Wilderness.

== Geography and geology ==
The wilderness contains some of the most spectacular and highest peaks of the Sierra Nevada, with 57 peaks over 13,000 feet (4,000 m) in elevation. The peaks are typically made of granite from the Sierra Nevada Batholith, and are dramatically shaped by glacial action. The southernmost glacier in the United States, the Palisade Glacier, is contained within the wilderness area. Notable east-side glaciated canyons are drained by Rock, McGee and Bishop Creeks.

The eastern escarpment in the wilderness rises from 6,000 to 8,000 feet (1,800 to 2,400 m) from base to peak, in 5 to 6 miles (8 to 10 km). The Sierra crest contains peaks from 12,000 to 14,000 feet (3,700 to 4,300 m) in elevation, including Mount Whitney, the highest peak in the continental United States. Other notable mountains in the wilderness area include the Palisades and Mount Humphreys. Mount Muir is located 2 miles south of Mount Whitney. Mount Williamson is the second-highest peak in the wilderness, at 14,375 feet (4,382 m): it rises in one continuous sweep of granite from the floor of the Owens Valley to a peak just east of the main range.

== Ecology ==
The John Muir Wilderness contains the largest contiguous area above 10,000 feet (3,000 m) in the continental United States. It contains large areas of subalpine meadows and fellfields above 10,800 feet (3,300 m), containing stands of whitebark and foxtail pine. From 9,000 feet (2,700 m) to 10,800 feet (3,300 m), the wilderness is dominated by lodgepole pines. Below the lodgepole forest is forest dominated by Jeffrey pine.

Common animals in the wilderness include yellow-bellied marmots, pikas, golden-mantled ground squirrels, Clark's nutcrackers, golden trout, and black bears. The wilderness area also includes California bighorn sheep zoological areas, which are set aside for the protection of the species.

== Recreation ==
The wilderness contains 589.5 miles (948.7 km) of hiking trails, including the John Muir Trail and the Pacific Crest Trail, which run through the wilderness from north to south. The John Muir Wilderness is the second most-visited wilderness in the United States, and quotas for overnight use have been implemented on virtually all trailheads.

== Lakes ==
Due to extensive glaciation, there are 957 lakes in the wilderness, with 100 lakes in the drainage of Bishop Creek alone. A partial list of lakes is shown below:

- Dingleberry Lake
- Disappointment Lake
- Hell for Sure Lake
- Loch Leven
- Lake of the Lone Indian
- Mills Lake
- Nüümü Hu Hupi
- Pee Wee Lake
- Lake Virginia

== Gallery ==
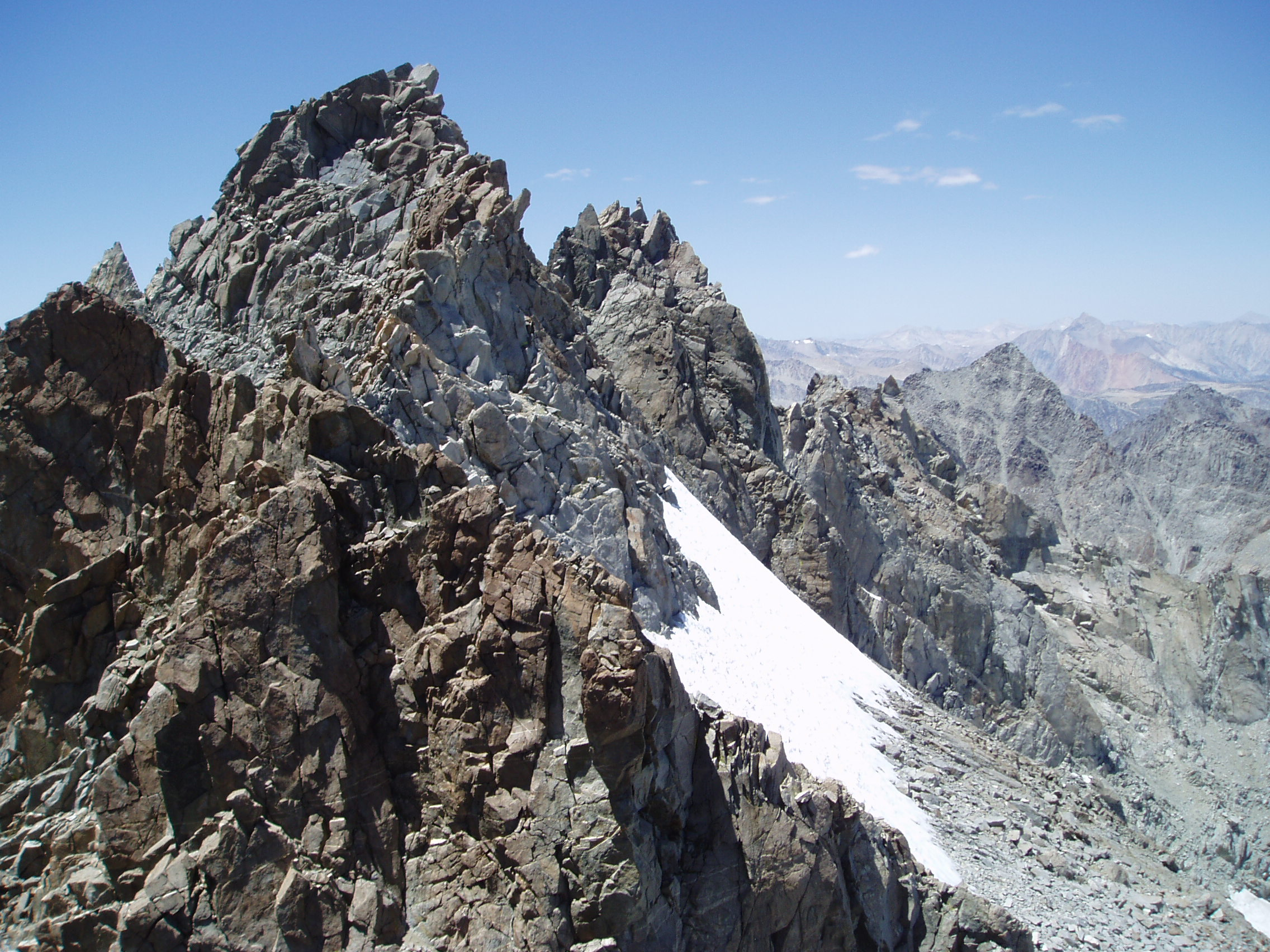
The Palisade Crest, a major rock-climbing area

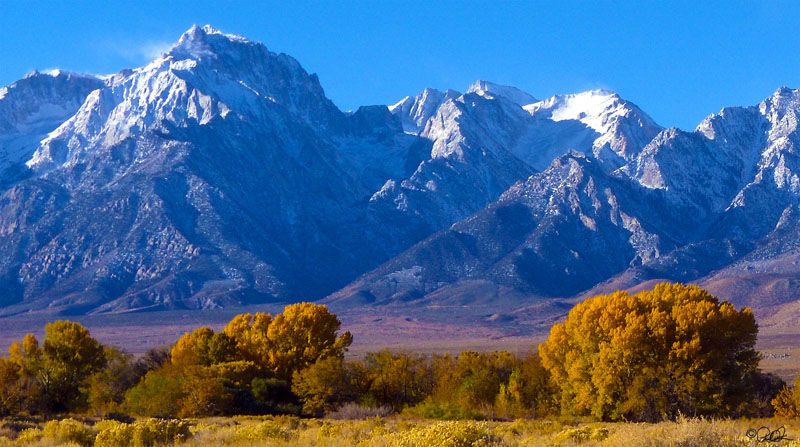
Mount Williamson and Mount Tyndall in the John Muir Wilderness from near Independence Airport

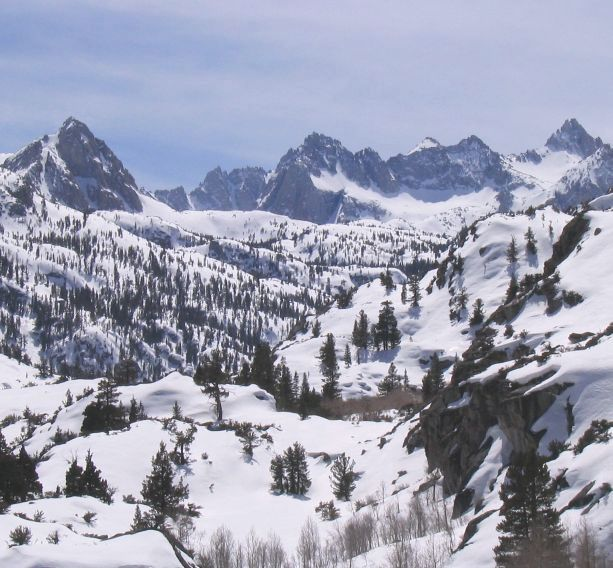
Sabrina Basin in the John Muir Wilderness. Winter conditions linger until June in many years.

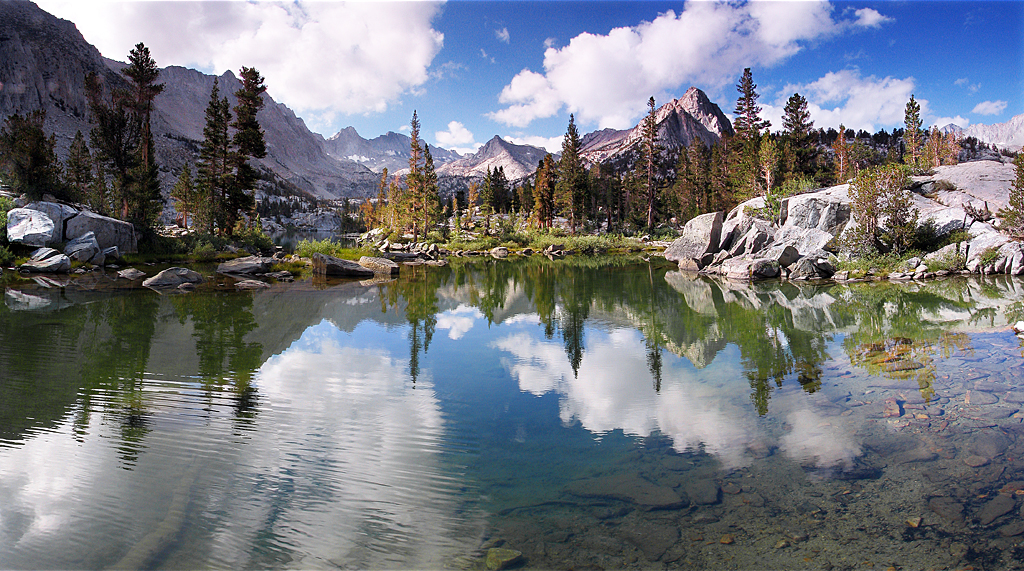
Blue Lake in the Sabrina Basin

== See also ==
- Bibliography of the Sierra Nevada, for further reading
