= Roberts Lake =

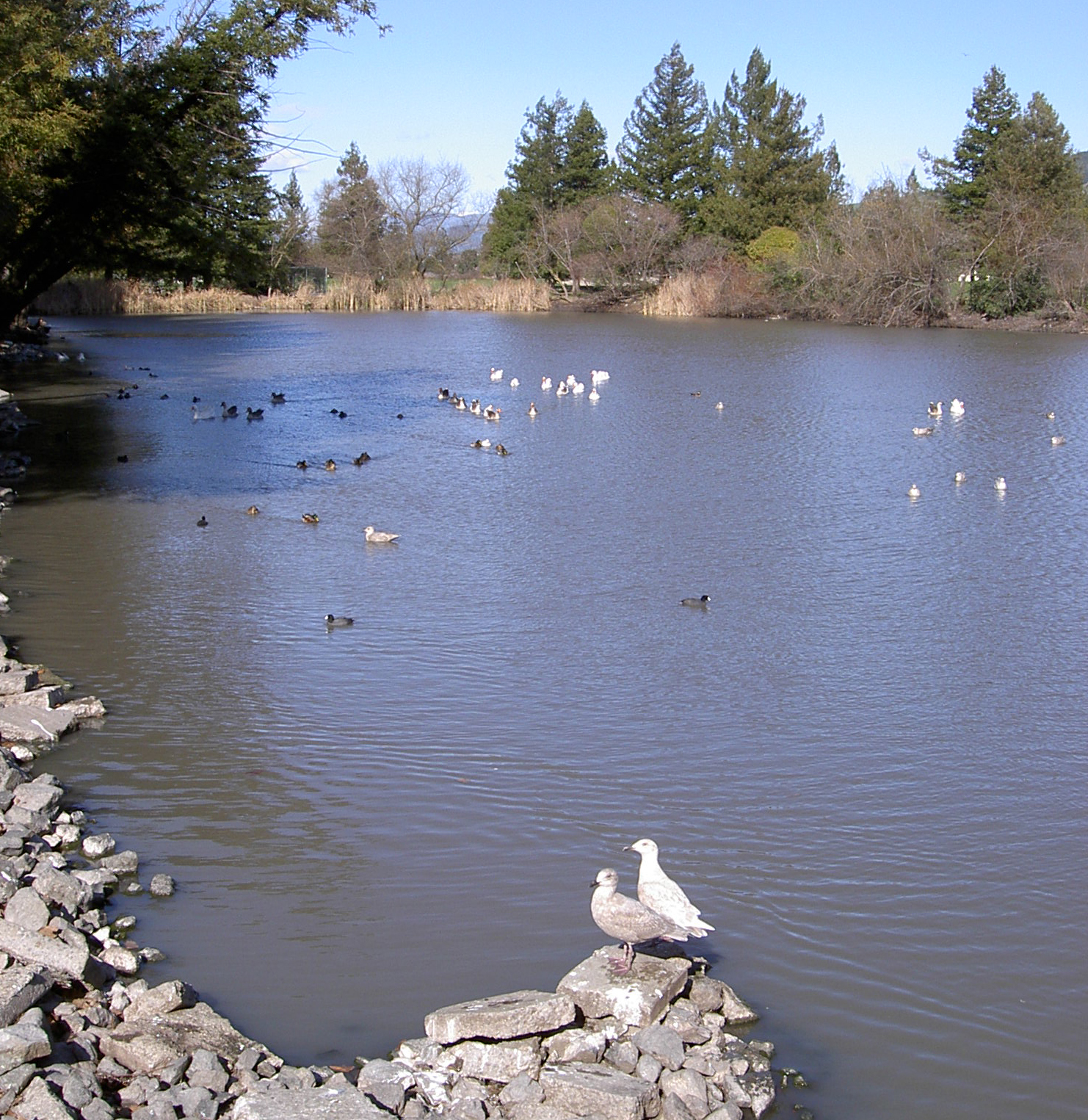
- birds on Roberts Lake in 2009

- Location within California Location within the United States
- Location: Rohnert Park, California
- Coordinates: 38°21′55″N 122°42′38″W
- Type: reservoir
- Basin countries: United States
- Max. length: 800 feet (240 m)
- Surface area: 5 acres (2.0 ha)
- Surface elevation: 98 feet (30 m)

Roberts Lake is a reservoir at 5010 Roberts Lake Road in Rohnert Park, California, USA. Named after Arthur N. Roberts, a five-term mayor who died in 1986, it is the centerpiece of Roberts Lake Park, a city park.

The lake is the site of an annual free fishing derby for children fifteen years and under. Fish species found in the lake include rainbow trout, bluegill, crappie, channel catfish, carp, and largemouth bass.

== See also ==
- List of dams and reservoirs in California
- List of lakes in California
- List of lakes in the San Francisco Bay Area
