= Sunset Reservoir =

- Location within San Francisco Bay Area
- Location: San Francisco, California
- Coordinates: 37°44′59″N 122°29′00″W
- Type: Reservoir
- Primary inflows: Municipal Water System
- Primary outflows: Municipal Water System
- Basin countries: United States
- Max. length: 330 m (1,080 ft)
- Max. width: 155 m (509 ft)
- Surface area: 11 acres (4.5 ha)
- Max. depth: 10 m (33 ft)
- Water volume: 270 acre⋅ft (330,000 m^{3})
- Surface elevation: 116 m (381 ft)
- References: U.S. Geological Survey Geographic Names Information System: Sunset Reservoir

View of Sunset Reservoir's solar panels

Sunset Reservoir is one of three terminal reservoirs in the Regional Water System in San Francisco, California. The reservoir, the city's largest, is located in the Sunset District at 24th Avenue and Ortega Street, and is owned and maintained by the San Francisco Public Utilities Commission. Completed in 1960, the subterranean reservoir was constructed as an 11-acre (4.5 ha), 1,000 by 500 feet (300 m × 150 m), concrete basin, now containing 720 floor-to-ceiling columns. With its maximum depth of 33 ft (10 m), the reservoir's capacity is 270 acre⋅ft (330,000 m^{3}) with average daily flows of 46 acre-feet (57,000 m^{3}) through 42-inch (1.1 m) inlet/outlet pipes.

== Seismic upgrades ==
- Seismic rehabilitation, which would include stabilization of the soil dam embankment (completed); a retrofit of the walls and roof using seismic joints, shear walls, diagonal bracing, and struts; and foundation improvements.
- General rehabilitation, which would include repairing deteriorated concrete, replacing part of the reservoir lining material, replacing inlet piping, installing security fencing, upgrading the landscaping, and other miscellaneous site improvements.

== Solar project ==
The Sunset Reservoir Solar Project has installed 25,000 solar panels on the 480,000 ft^{2} (45,000 m^{2}) roof of the reservoir. The 5-megawatt plant more than tripled the city's 2-megawatt solar generation capacity. It opened in December 2010 in a ceremony introduced by then Mayor Gavin Newsom.

Generation (MW·h) of Sunset Reservoir North Basin
| Year | Jan | Feb | Mar | Apr | May | Jun | Jul | Aug | Sep | Oct | Nov | Dec | Total |
|---|---|---|---|---|---|---|---|---|---|---|---|---|---|
| 2010 | | | | | | | | | 620 | 278 | 238 | 89 | 1,224 |
| 2011 | 4 | 288 | 413 | 685 | 841 | 1,080 | 929 | 957 | 661 | 528 | 188 | 178 | 6,751 |
| 2012 | 20 | 202 | 496 | 718 | 987 | 1,067 | 922 | 727 | 681 | 535 | 274 | 200 | 6,828 |
| 2013 | 47 | 96 | 163 | 172 | 193 | 246 | 232 | 313 | 304 | 269 | 268 | 280 | 2,582 |
| 2014 | 242 | 276 | 485 | 574 | 660 | 732 | 677 | 733 | 715 | 645 | 536 | 366 | 6,640 |
| 2015 | 323 | 407 | 596 | 669 | 673 | 693 | 717 | 726 | 599 | 505 | 467 | 385 | 6,759 |
| 2016 | 266 | 444 | 490 | 571 | 710 | 681 | 795 | 784 | 691 | 583 | 501 | 365 | 6,879 |
| 2017 | 267 | 298 | 556 | 586 | 737 | 799 | 728 | 673 | 628 | 579 | 356 | 339 | 6,545 |
| 2018 | 320 | 451 | 516 | 645 | 777 | 837 | 724 | 729 | 690 | 544 | 374 | 297 | 6,905 |
| 2019 | 302 | 353 | 536 | 624 | 649 | 785 | 775 | 759 | 620 | 570 | 365 | 235 | 6,572 |
| 2020 | 337 | 456 | 447 | 563 | 737 | 734 | 829 | 686 | 539 | 498 | 394 | 312 | 6,531 |
| 2021 | 314 | 412 | 531 | 665 | 725 | 704 | 674 | 663 | 572 | 476 | 379 | 259 | 6,375 |
| 2022 | 330 | 393 | 521 | 588 | 689 | 718 | 692 | 643 | 542 | 500 | 370 | 259 | 6,246 |
| 2023 | 256 | 369 | 563 | 804 | 655 | 587 | 605 | 577 | 456 | 508 | 382 | 266 | 6,028 |
| 2024 | 284 | 314 | 561 | 768 | 815 | 733 | 651 | 675 | 520 | 523 | 359 | 285 | 6,488 |
| 2025 | 324 | 337 | 609 | 690 | 905 | 725 | 609 | 684 | 510 | 395 | 317 | 284 | 6,389 |
| Total | | | | | | | | | | | | | 95,742 |

== See also ==
- List of lakes in California
- List of lakes in the San Francisco Bay Area
