= Miller/Knox Lagoon =

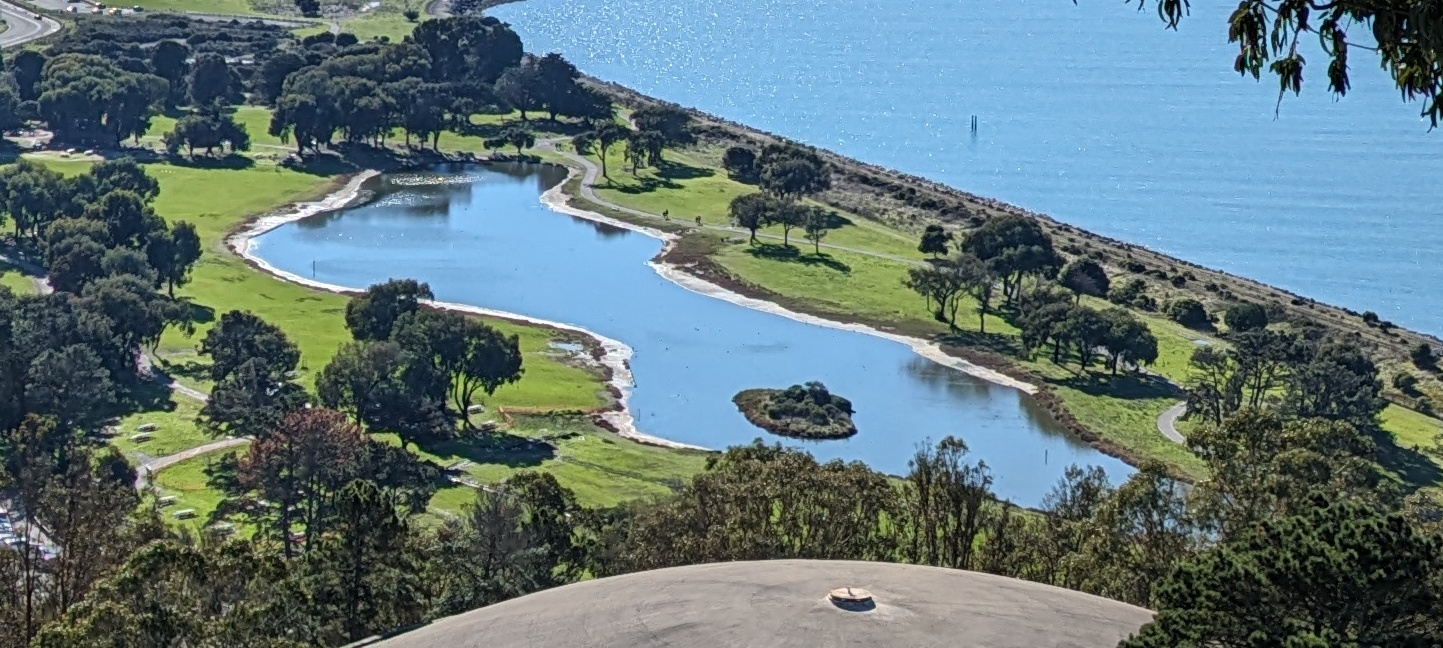

- Location within California
- Location: Miller/Knox Regional Park, Richmond, Contra Costa County, California
- Coordinates: 37°54′57″N 122°23′10″W
- Type: Lagoon

Miller/Knox Lagoon is a lake in Richmond, California.

== Overview ==
The lake is fed by underground salt water from San Pablo Bay and is man-made. It is located in the Pt. Richmond neighborhood. The pond is located within Miller/Knox Regional Park. The hole in the ground that was filled to form a water body was formerly part of quarries used during public works in the city of Richmond during the World War II home front.

== See also ==
- List of lakes in California
- List of lakes in the San Francisco Bay Area
