= Walker Creek (Marin County, California) =

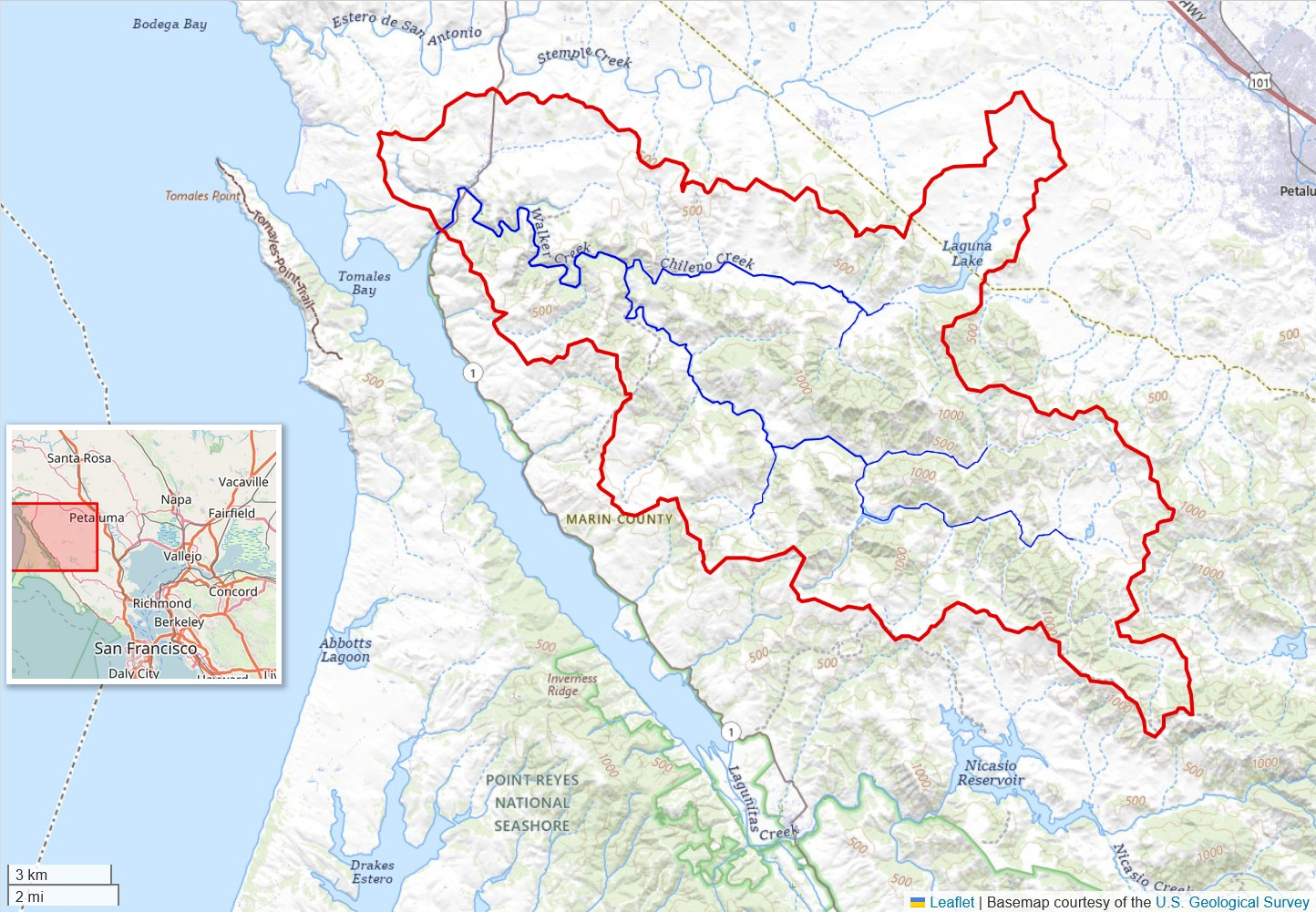
- Walker Creek watershed (Interactive map)

Location
- Country: United States
- State: California
- Region: Marin County
- District: West Marin

Physical characteristics
- Source: Confluence of Arroyo Sausal and Salmon Creek
  - coordinates: 38°09′42″N 122°41′16″W
  - elevation: 233 ft (71 m)
- Mouth: Tomales Bay
  - location: south of Preston Point
  - coordinates: 38°12′30″N 122°55′49″W
  - elevation: 0 ft (0 m)
- Length: 18.5 mi (29.8 km)

Basin features
- Tributaries
  - left: Verde Canyon, Frink Canyon
  - right: Chileno Creek, Keys Creek

Walker Creek is a perennial 19.8 miles (31.9 km) northwest-flowing stream in western Marin County, California, United States. It originates at the confluence of Salmon Creek and Arroyo Sausal, and empties into Tomales Bay south of Dillon Beach, California.

== History ==
Walker Creek is named for an early landowner in the area, Lewis W. Walker.

Chileno Creek is named for Chilean immigrants who settled the Chileno Valley, with encouragement from Adrian Godoy.

Keys Creek is named for Irish settler John Keyes, who settled on the creek in 1849 and used this once-important waterway to transport agricultural produce to San Francisco.

== Watershed and course ==
The Walker Creek watershed drains 76 square miles (200 km^{2}) and ranges from 1,500 feet (460 m) to sea level where the creek empties into Tomales Bay just south of its mouth. The Walker Creek mainstem is formed by the confluence of Arroyo Sausal and Salmon Creek.

Arroyo Sausal heads at about 984 feet (300 m) and flows northwest, crossing Point Reyes-Petaluma Road into Hicks Valley then west to Soulajule Reservoir. This reservoir was constructed in 1979 in Arroyo Sausal and is managed by the Marin Municipal Water District (MMWD).

The California Office of Environmental Health Hazard Assessment has issued a safe eating advisory for any fish caught in Soulajule Reservoir due to elevated levels of mercury and PCBs.

From here Arroyo Sausal and Salmon Creek join to form Walker Creek at elevation 213 feet (65 m) at Marshall-Petaluma Road.

Salmon Creek heads at 800 feet (240 m) and flows west 4.5 miles (7.2 km) along Hicks Valley Road then Marshall-Petaluma Road to meet Arroyo Sausal and form Walker Creek. Salmon Creek was described historically as a salmon and steelhead trout (Oncorhynchus mykiss) spawning and nursery area, although it has been seriously damaged by poor farming practices, dairy pollution and soil erosion.

From the confluence of Arroyo Sausal and Salmon Creek, Walker Creek descends to the northwest, paralleling Marshall-Petaluma Road as it curves westward. At the mouth of Verde Canyon, the creek crosses under the road and turns northwest, passing the mouth of Frink Canyon to a confluence with Chileno Creek. At the top of the Chileno Valley, a 220-acre (89 ha) natural lake, Laguna Lake, which straddles the Sonoma County - Marin County border and is the source of Chileno Creek, which flows 6.25 miles (10.06 km) west along Bolinas Ridge to Walker Creek.

From the Chileno Creek confluence, Walker Creek meanders westward, passing south of the town of Tomales, California. It crosses under Highway 1 at milepost 44.45 and is immediately joined by Keys Creek, entering from the north.

Keys Creek heads at 290 feet (88 m) and flows 3.5 miles (5.6 km) west through the town of Tomales below which it joins Walker Creek.

Below Keys Creek, Walker Creek continues southward along the Highway 1 to enter Tomales Bay just east of Preston Point.

== Ecology ==
In the early 1900s, coho salmon (Oncorhynchus kisutch) were abundant in Walker Creek, but were nearly extirpated apparently due to severe erosion and siltation secondary to potato farming, overgrazing and logging operations. Walker Creek coho are part of the federally endangered Central California Coast coho salmon evolutionarily significant unit (ESU). Since the 1970s, Walker Creek has relied heavily on hatchery releases of both adult and juvenile coho to prevent local extirpation and maintain a portfolio effect of species diversity.

In 1975 D. W. Kelley performed a comprehensive investigation of steelhead trout (Oncorhynchus mykiss) and coho salmon populations in Walker Creek. He found small numbers of steelhead young-of-the-year in all viable habitat areas in the watershed, but only eight coho near the confluence of Chileno and Walker Creek. In addition, the Soulajule Reservoir dam blocked all anadromous salmonid fish migration to 19.9 miles (32.0 km) of spawning habitat in upper Arroyo Sausal. California Department of Fish and Game (CDFG) began planting coho salmon from Olema Creek into Walker Creek in 2003 with modest success. In 2008 and again in 2013 coho returned to Walker Creek, Salmon Creek and Frink Canyon. A study of coho smolts in 2022 and 2023 found Walker Creek natural-origin were more abundant than hatchery-origin.

Fishing for steelhead is open only below Highway 1.

Portions of Keyes Creek immediately downstream of the present Highway One bridge were once navigable and used to ship locally-grown potatoes by barge to San Francisco. The current small size of the channel at this location, more suitable for a canoe than a barge, is dramatic evidence of siltation due to erosive agricultural practices(potato farming) in the Walker Creek watershed over the past 150 years.

Mercury was mined at several sites in the Walker Creek watershed through the 1960s and early 1970s including the Gambonini, Chileno Valley, Franciscan and Cycle mines. Soulajule Reservoir, built after a severe drought in 1976–1977 inundated the Franciscan and Cycle mines and a tailings pile. The largest mine, at the Gambonini Ranch near the confluence of Salmon Creek and mainstem Walker Creek, closed in 1970.

== See also ==
- Tomales Bay
