= List of lakes of the San Francisco Bay Area =

This list of lakes in the San Francisco Bay Area groups lakes, ponds, and reservoirs by county. Numbers in parentheses are Geographic Names Information System feature ids.

== Alameda County ==
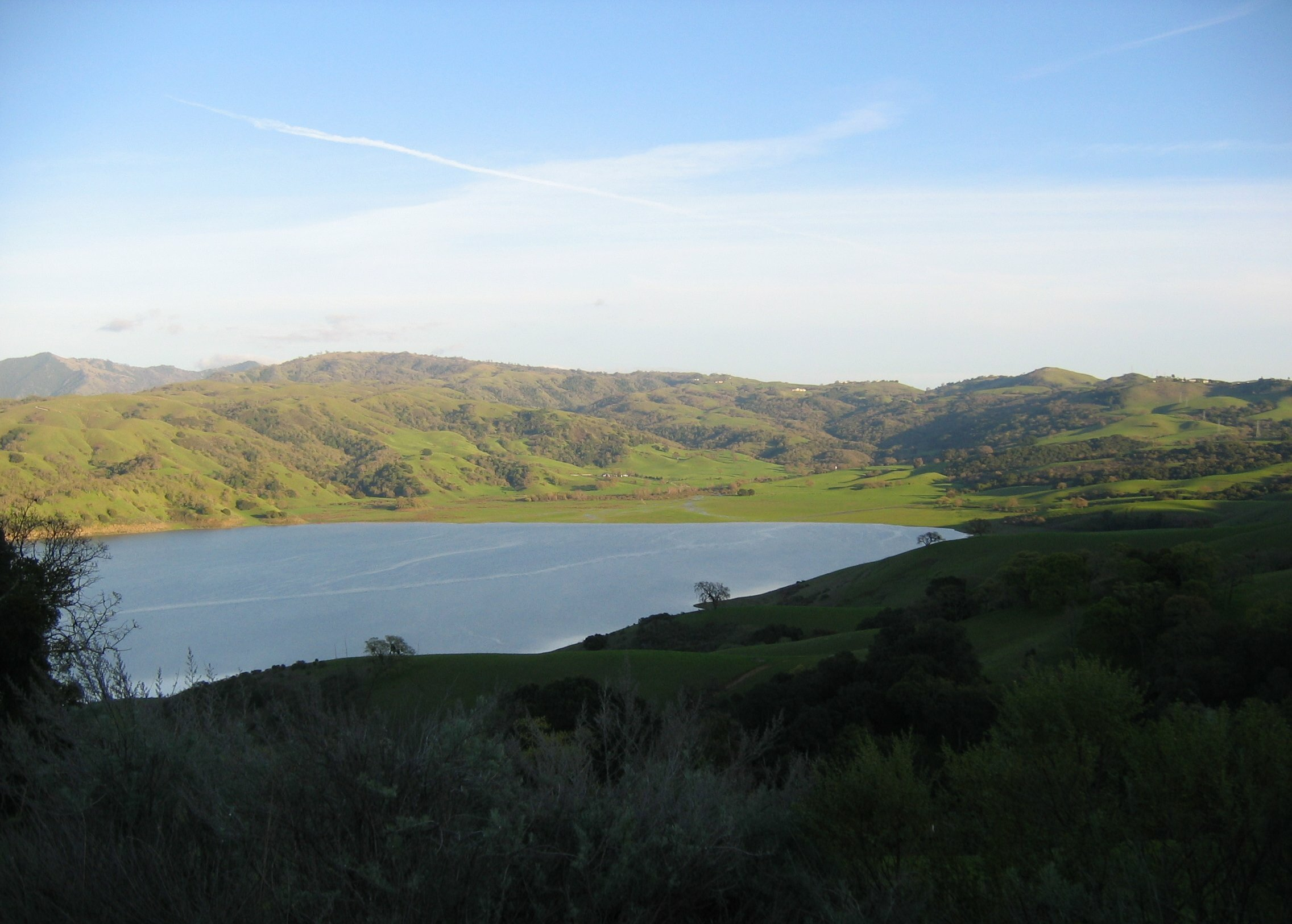
Calaveras Reservoir

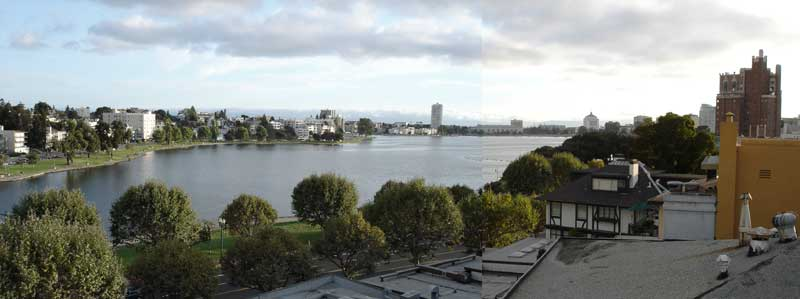
Lake Merritt

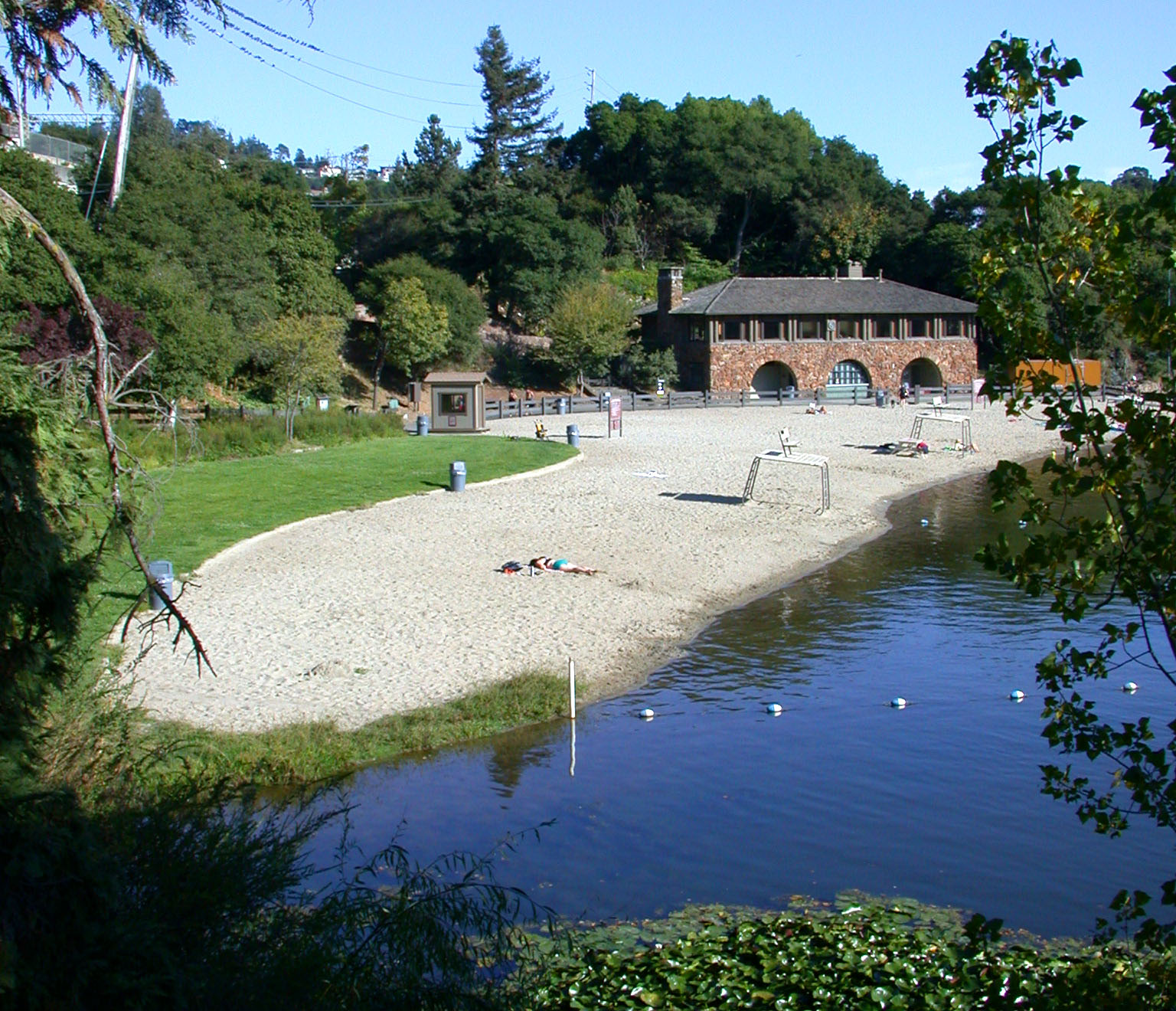
Lake Temescal

- Almond Reservoir (218160)
- Berryman Reservoir (219088)
- Bethany Reservoir (219098)
- Calaveras Reservoir (220379) - partly in Santa Clara County.
- Central Reservoir (220847)
- Lake Chabot (220870)
- Cull Canyon Lake (1723526)
- Lake Del Valle (254866)
- Dingee Reservoir (222398)
- Don Castro Reservoir (222487)
- Lake Elizabeth (1670278)
- Frick Lake (223949)
- Frog Pond (1682723)
- Heron Pond (1665767)
- Jordan Pond (2124549)
- The Lagoon (1670278)
- Lake Merritt (234279)
- Middlefield Reservoir (228624)
- Mission Reservoir (228841)
- Newt Pond (2124554)
- Niles Reservoir (229555)
- Patterson Reservoir (230414)
- Reservoir Number One (1652825)
- Reservoir Number Two (1652826)
- San Antonio Reservoir (232370)
- Seneca Reservoir (232803)
- South Reservoir (235103)
- Swimming Lagoon (1692946)
- Lake Temescal (236093)
- Thirtyninth Avenue Reservoir (1961779)
- Tule Pond (236606)
- Tyson Lake (236749)
- Upper San Leandro Reservoir (236920) - partly in Contra Costa County.
- Whitfield Reservoir

== Contra Costa County ==
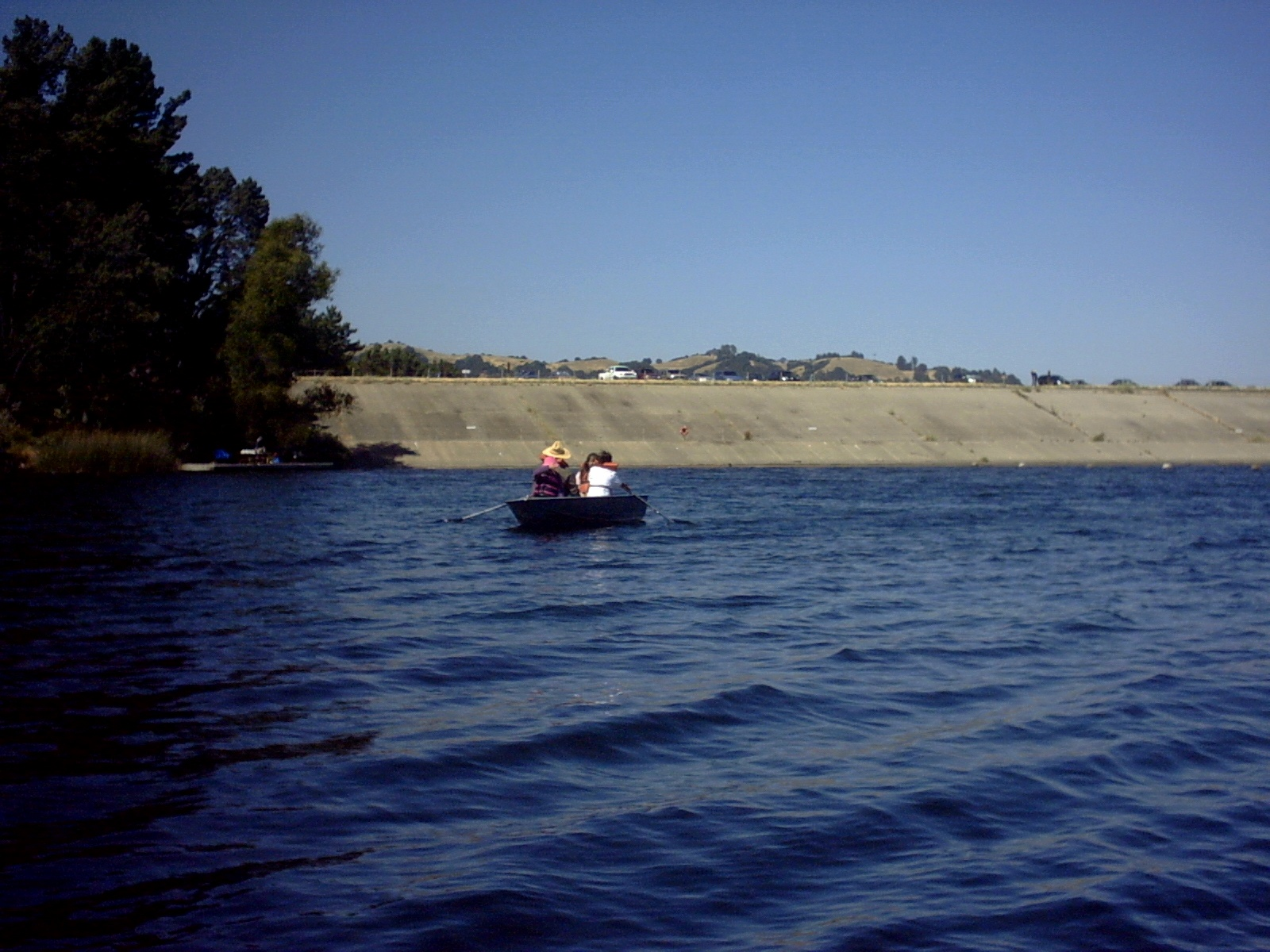
Lafayette Reservoir

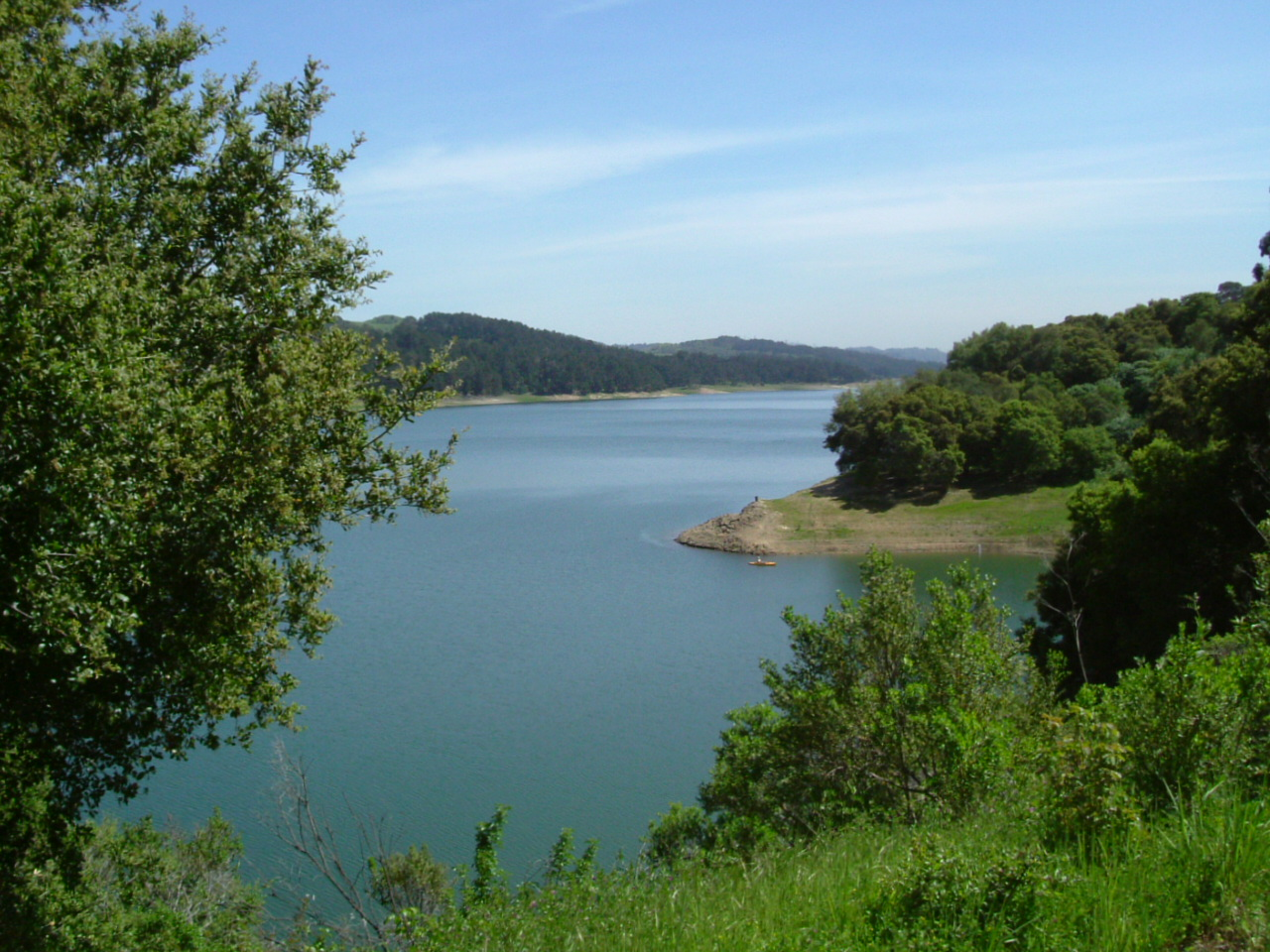
San Pablo Reservoir

- Lake Alhambra (218122)
- Antioch Municipal Reservoir (218305)
- Lake Anza (218314)
- Black Hills Reservoir (219371)
- Brickyard Cove Pond
- Briones Reservoir (219847)
- Brookwood Reservoir (219881)
- Lake Cascade (220668)
- Chase Pond (220929)
- Clifton Court Forebay (253867)
- Contra Loma Reservoir (221475, 1664595, 1664762)
- Lake El Toyonal
- Fay Hill Reservoir (2339742)
- Frog Pond (223956)
- Hidden Pond (225249)
- Hilltop Lake
- Jewel Lake (226225)
- Lafayette Reservoir (226751)
- Leland Reservoir (227018)
- Los Vaqueros Reservoir
- Mallard Reservoir (227982)
- Maloney Reservoir (227988)
- Marsh Creek Reservoir (228134)
- Martinez Reservoir (228184)
- Miller/Knox Lagoon
- Moraga Reservoir (2339743)
- North Reservoir (229748)
- Point Potrero Pond
- San Pablo Reservoir (232459)
- Selby Reservoir (1701692)
- Sindicich Lagoons (233172)
- Sobrante Reservoir (234813)
- Summit Reservoir (235757)
- Upper San Leandro Reservoir (236920) - partly in Alameda County.
- Willow Lake (1701831)

== Marin County ==
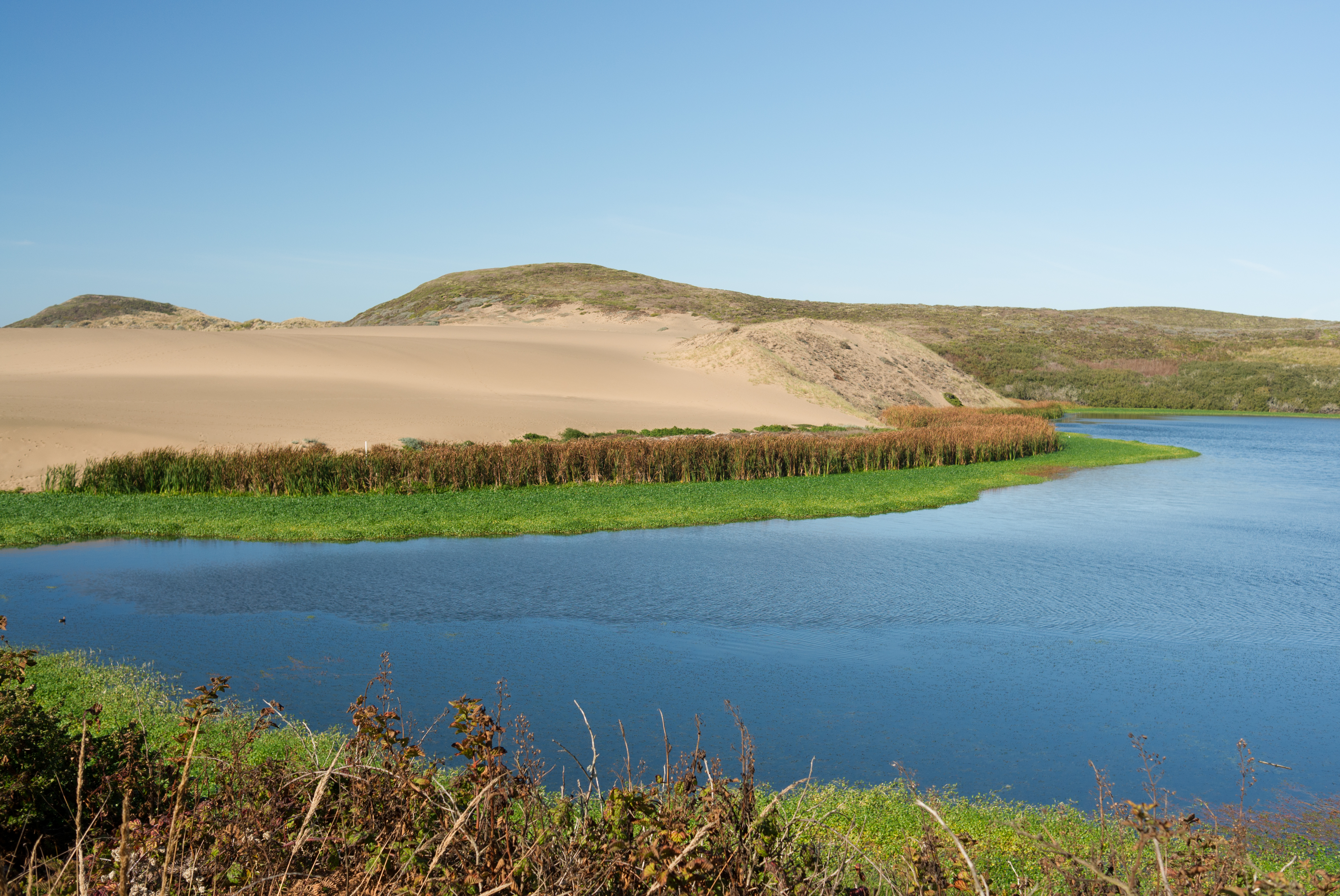
Abbotts_Lagoon

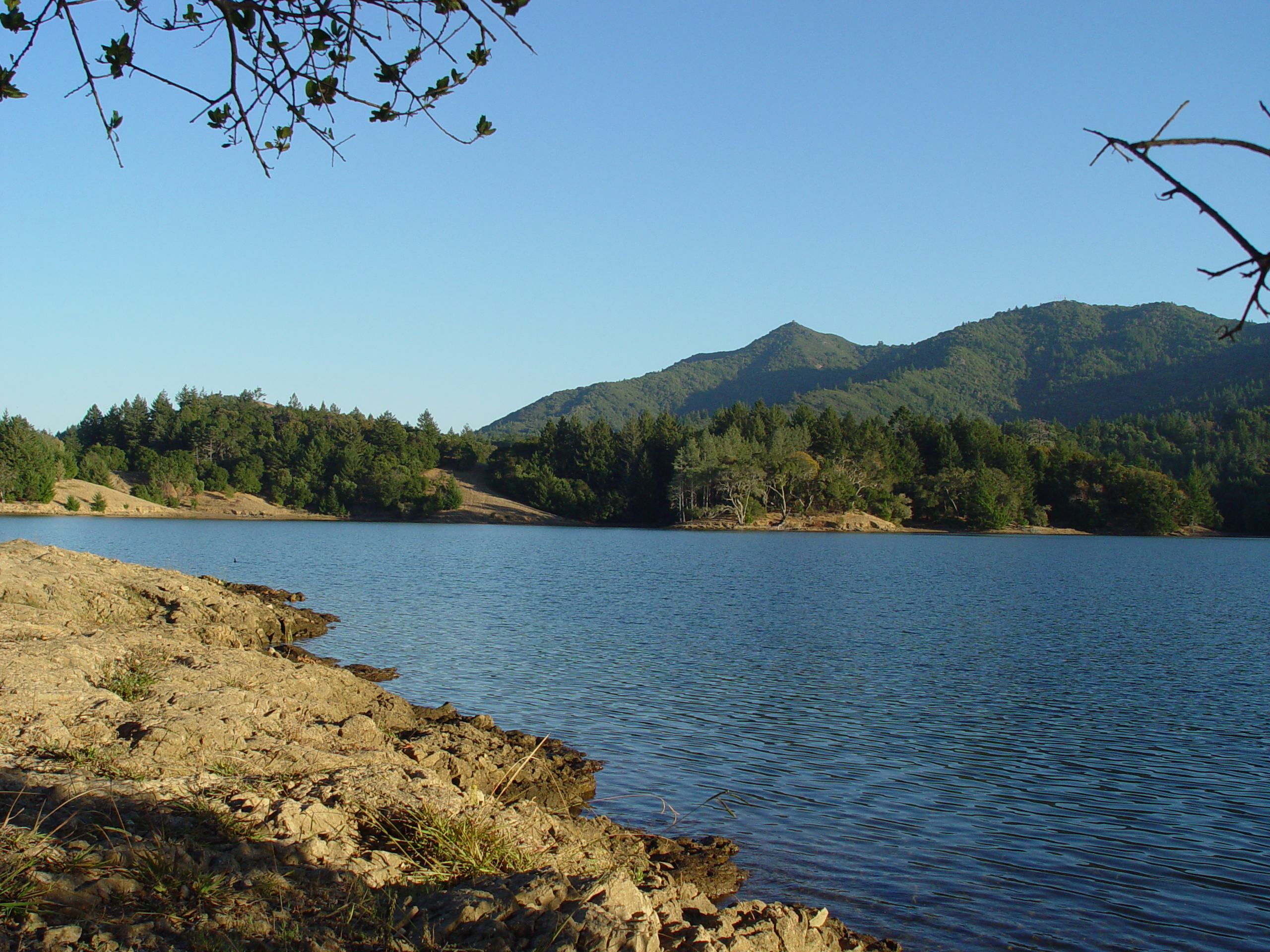
Bon Tempe Lake

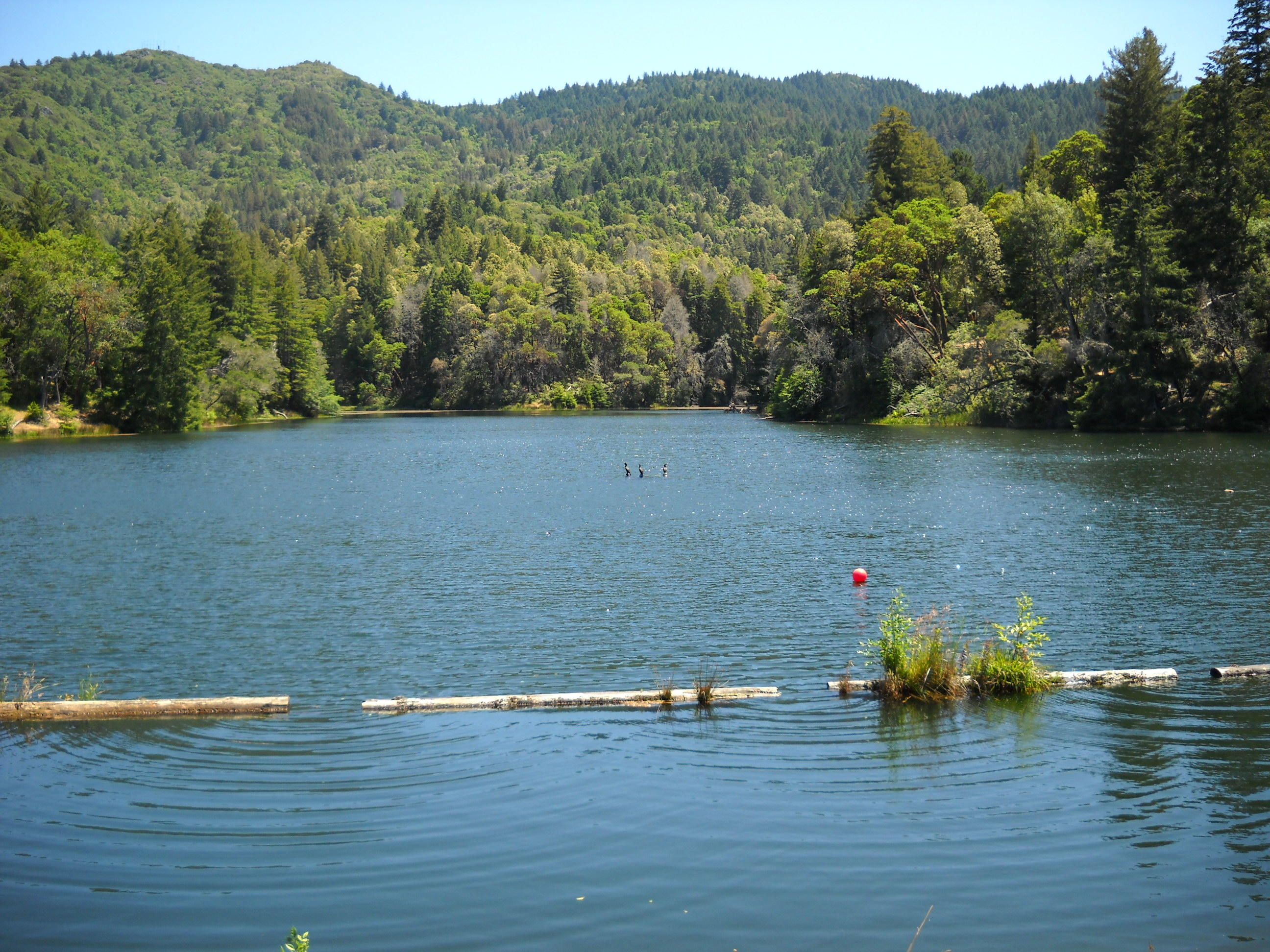
Lake Lagunitas

Stafford Lake

- Abbotts Lagoon (217942)
- Alpine Lake (218169)
- Arroyo Sausal Reservoir (1664489)
- Bass Lake (233463)
- Belvedere Lagoon (233490)
- Big Lagoon (219208)
- Bon Tempe Lake (219620)
- Civic Center Lagoon
- Crystal Lake (233745)
- Forbes Hill Reservoir (1800552)
- Hagmaier Pond North (1664776)
- Hagmaier Pond South (1664778)
- Haypress Pond (1809086)
- Kent Lake (226521, 1663440)
- Laguna Lake (226778) - partly in Sonoma County.
- Lake Lagunitas (226790)
- Lily Lake (227094)
- Mill Pond (1664780)
- Mill Valley Reservoir (1664230)
- Mud Lake (234340)
- Nicasio Reservoir (229536)
- Ocean Lake (234403)
- Pelican Lake (234445)
- Phoenix Lake (230609)
- Rodeo Lagoon (231805)
- Scottsdale Pond (1808908)
- Soulajule Reservoir (1800716)
- Stafford Lake (235342)
- Tamarancho Lake
- Wildcat Lake (237798)

== Napa County ==
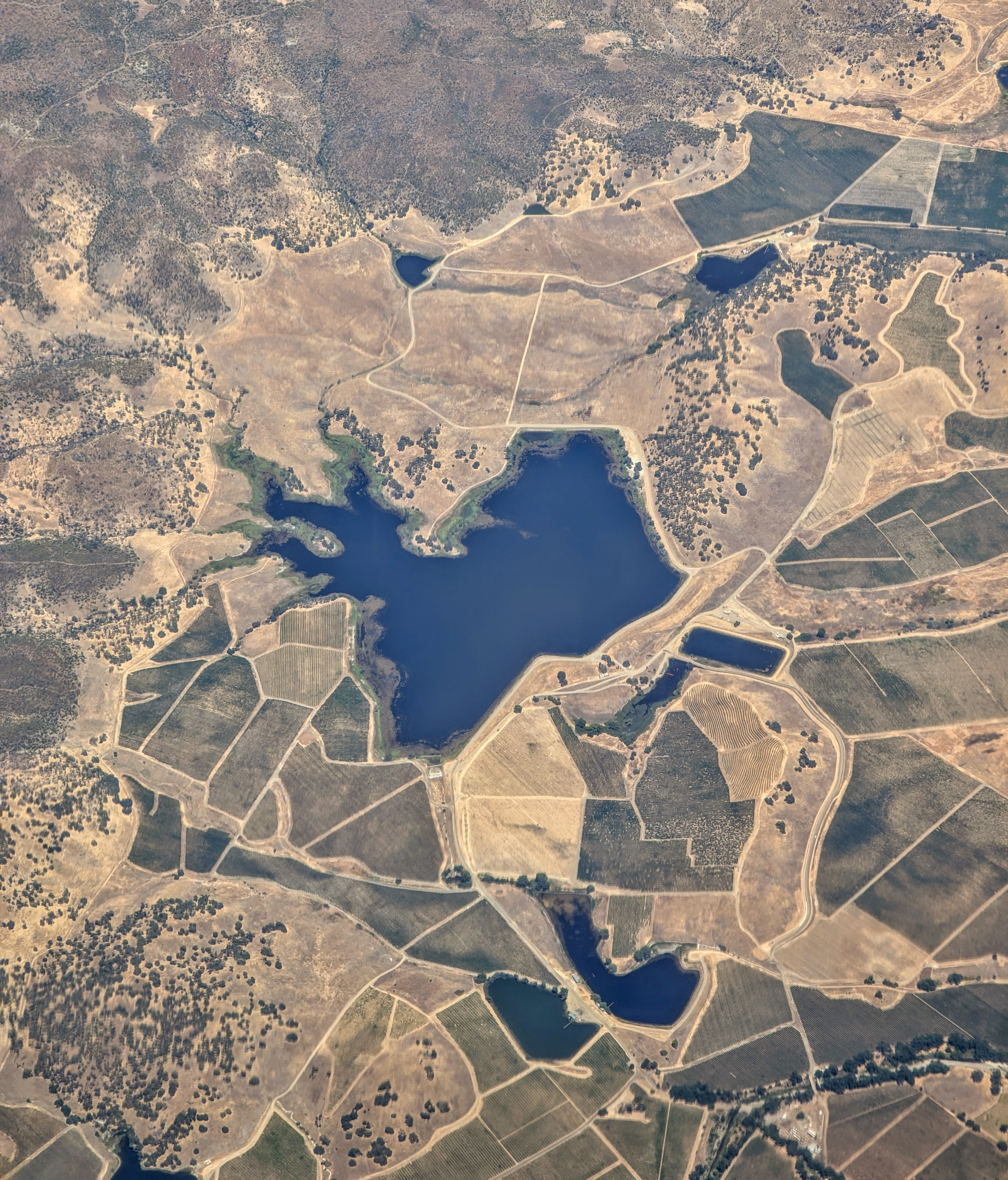
Aerial view of Weeks Lake, Pope Valley, California

- Alfalfa Patch Reservoir (218115)
- Bell Canyon Reservoir (218984)
- Lake Berryessa (255067)
- Lake Camille (233614)
- Cooksley Lake (221492)
- Lake Curry (221933)
- Crystal Lake (221885)
- Deer Lake (222193)
- Doe Lake (222459)
- Duvall Lake (233812)
- East Napa Reservoir (222915)
- East Side Reservoir (222927)
- Lake Ellen (223149, 1664361)
- Fawn Lake (223414)
- Fiege Reservoir (223484)
- Granite Lake (224411)
- Lake Henne (225175)
- Lake Hennessey (234004)
- Lake Hinman (225361)
- Horse Pond (225620)
- Leoma Lakes (227026)
- Lake Madigan (227915) - partly in Solano County.
- Lake Marie (228087)
- Milliken Reservoir (228762)
- Moskowitz Reservoir (229105)
- Mud Lake (229246)
- Lake Newton (229527)
- Lake Orville (230127)
- Rector Reservoir (234548)
- Red Lake (231340)
- Weeks Lake (1657248)
- Lake Whitehead (237689)
- Wild Lake (237767)
- West Napa Reservoir (237503)

== San Francisco ==
- Blue Heron Lake (235569)

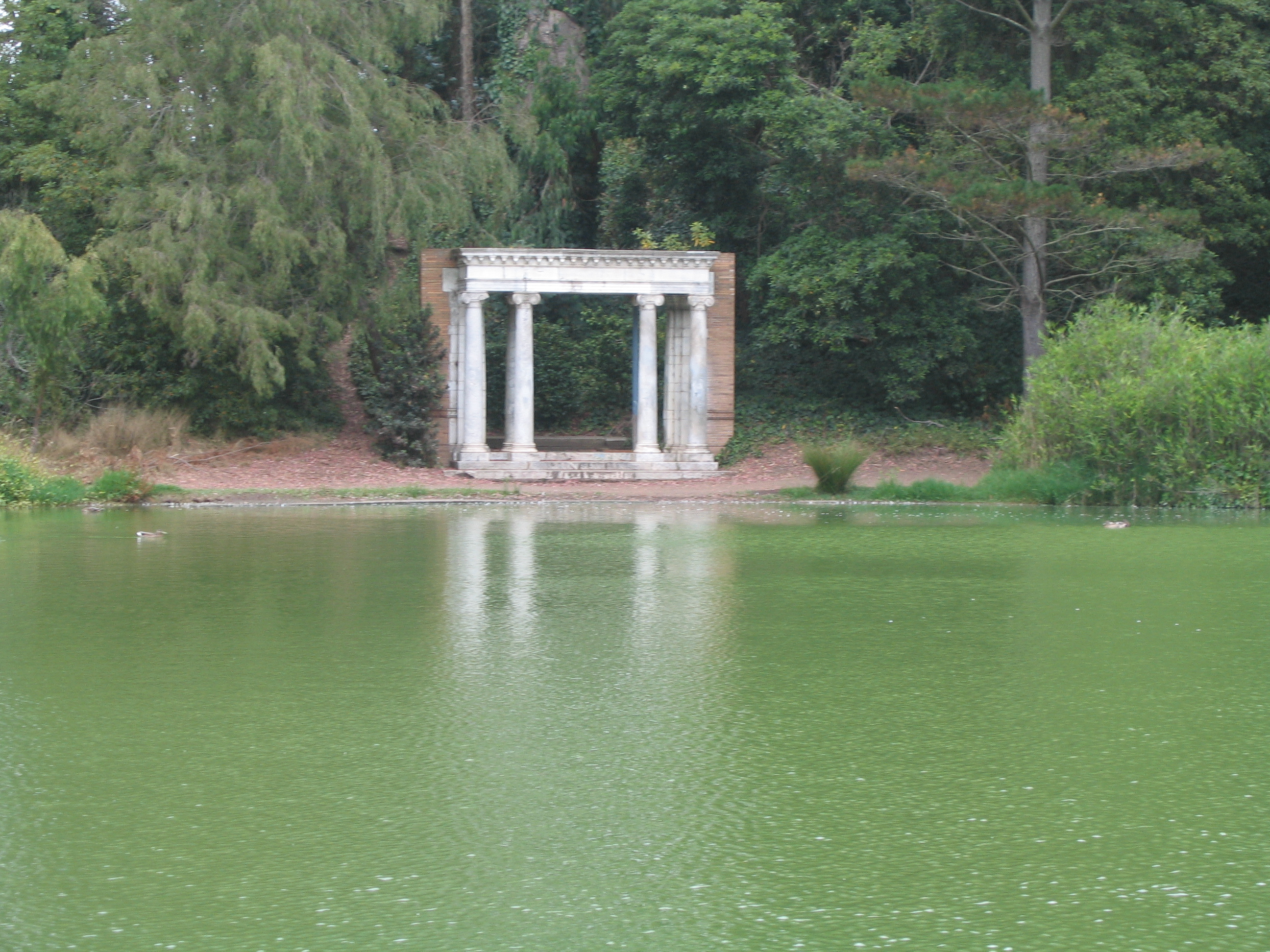
Lloyd Lake

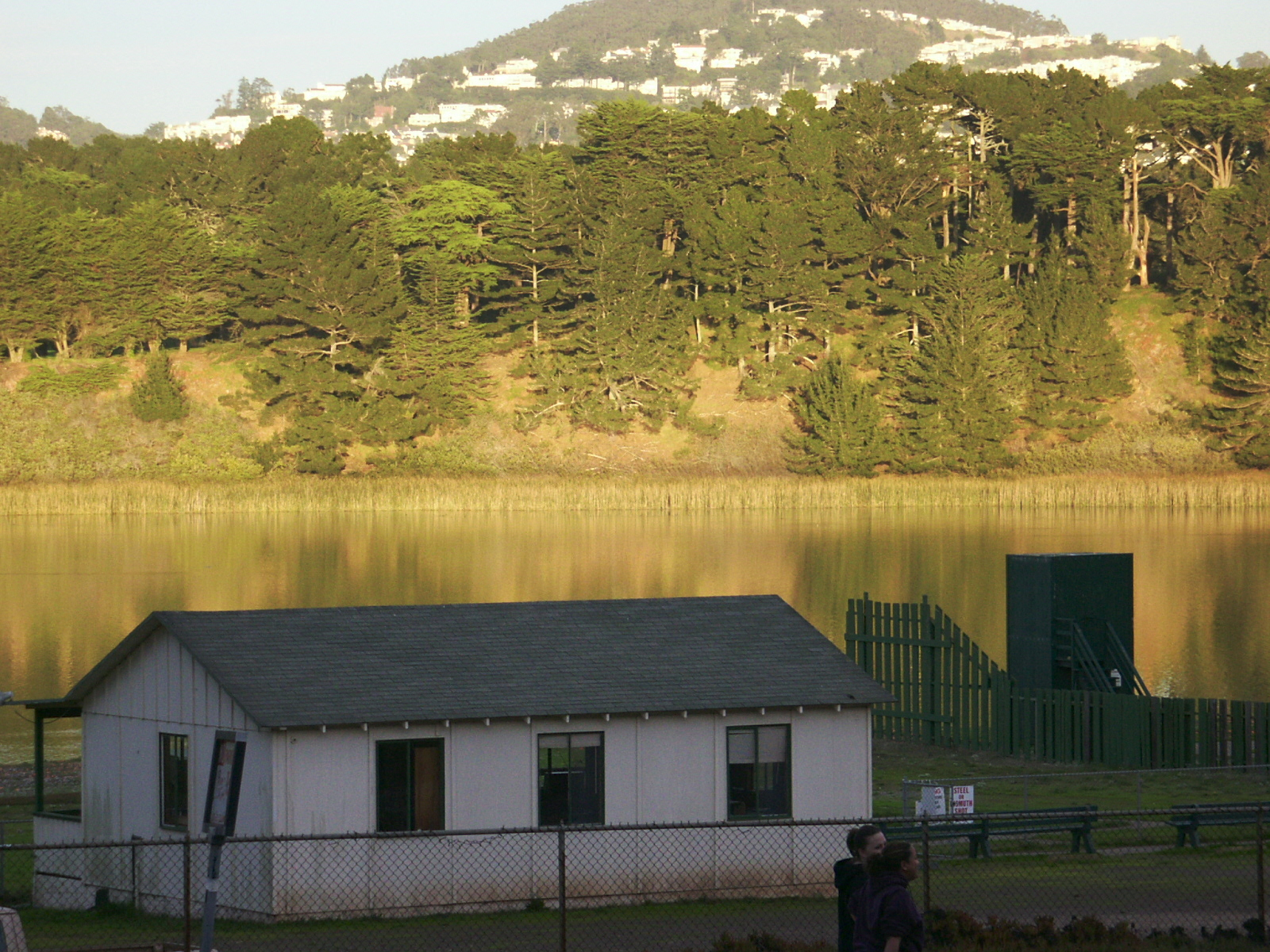
Lake Merced

- Elk Glen Lake (1656798)
- Laguna Honda Reservoir (226775)
- Lily Pond (1655433)
- Lloyd Lake (227443)
- Lombard Street Reservoir (1655437)
- Mallard Lake (227981)
- McNab Lake (1655696)
- Lake Merced (228515)
- Metson Lake (1655454)
- Middle Lake (228606)
- Mountain Lake (229186)
- North Basin (229598)
- North Lake (229738)
- Pine Lake (1656831)
- South Basin (234924)
- South Lake (235084)
- Spreckels Lake (235220)
- Sunset Reservoir (235813)
- Sutro Reservoir (235840)
- Twin Peaks Reservoir (1657308, 1663357)

== San Mateo County ==
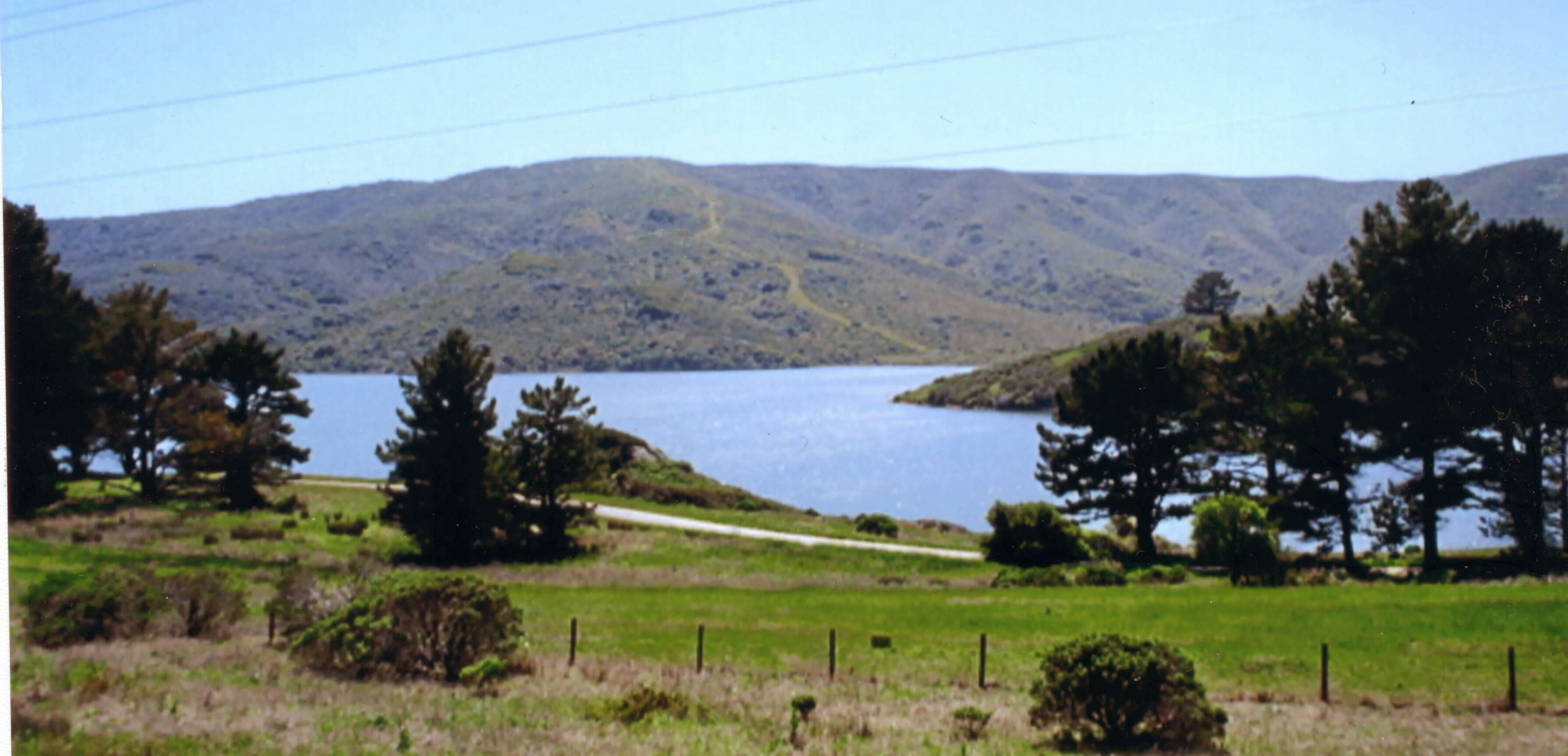
San Andreas Lake

- Bean Hollow Lake (1701695)
- Bear Gulch Reservoir (218853)
- Big Lagoon (219207)
- Central Lake (1785983)
- Crocker Lake
- Reservoir de los Frijoles (1663965, 1663967)
- Knuedler Lake (226666)
- Laguna Salada (234126)
- Little Lagoon (227290)
- Lower Crystal Springs Reservoir (234208)
- Lower Emerald Lake (227767)
- Lake Lucerne (227815)
- Mindego Lake (228784)
- Pearsons Pond (252203)
- Pilarcitos Lake (253890)
- Pomponio Reservoir (230915)
- Reflection Lake (231477)
- San Andreas Lake (253895)
- Schilling Lake (232649)
- Searsville Lake (232764)
- Spencer Lake (1785883)
- Stone Dam Reservoir (235518)
- Upper Crystal Springs Reservoir (236879)
- Upper Emerald Lake (236884)
- Water Dog Lake (1785922)

== Santa Clara County ==
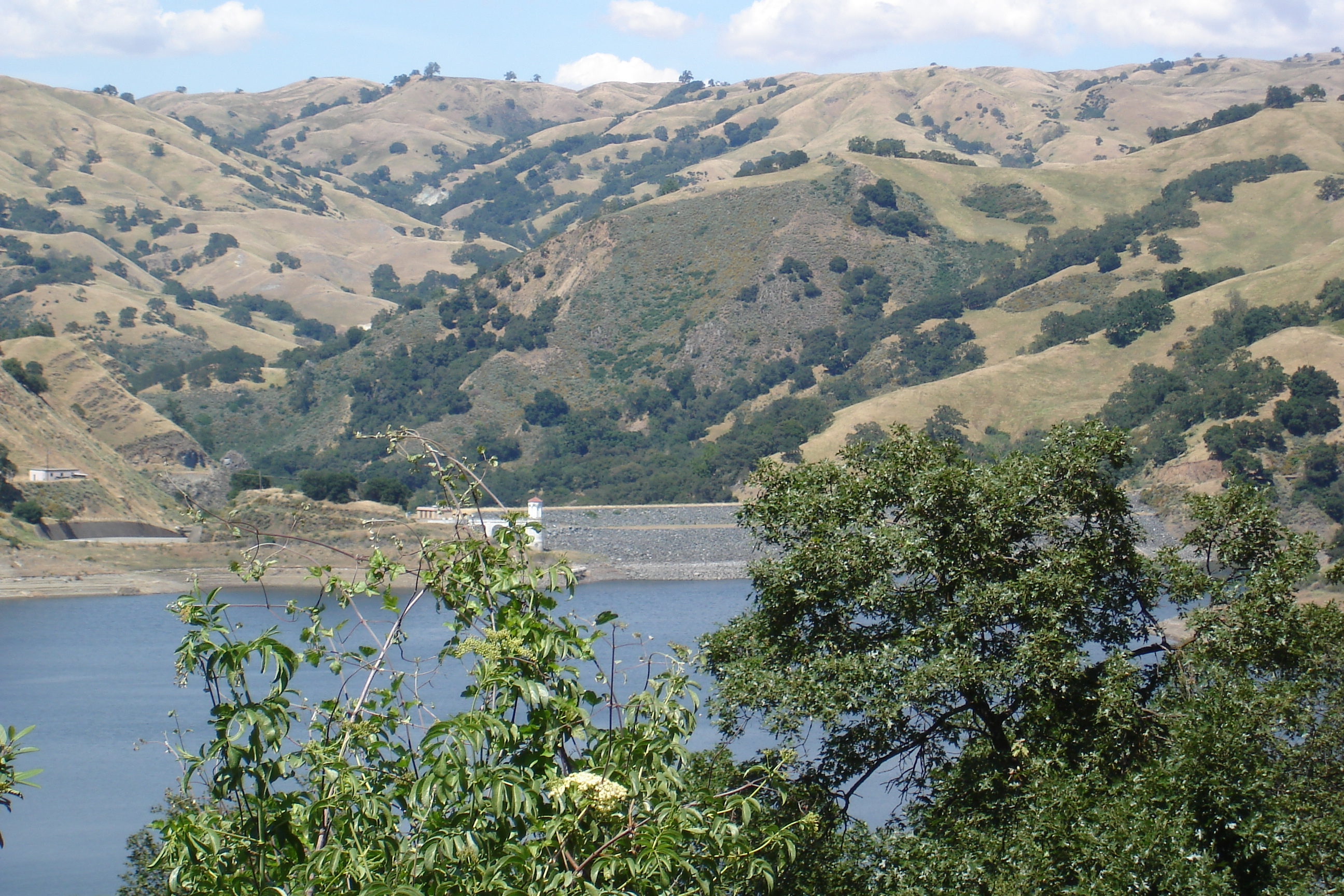
Calaveras Reservoir

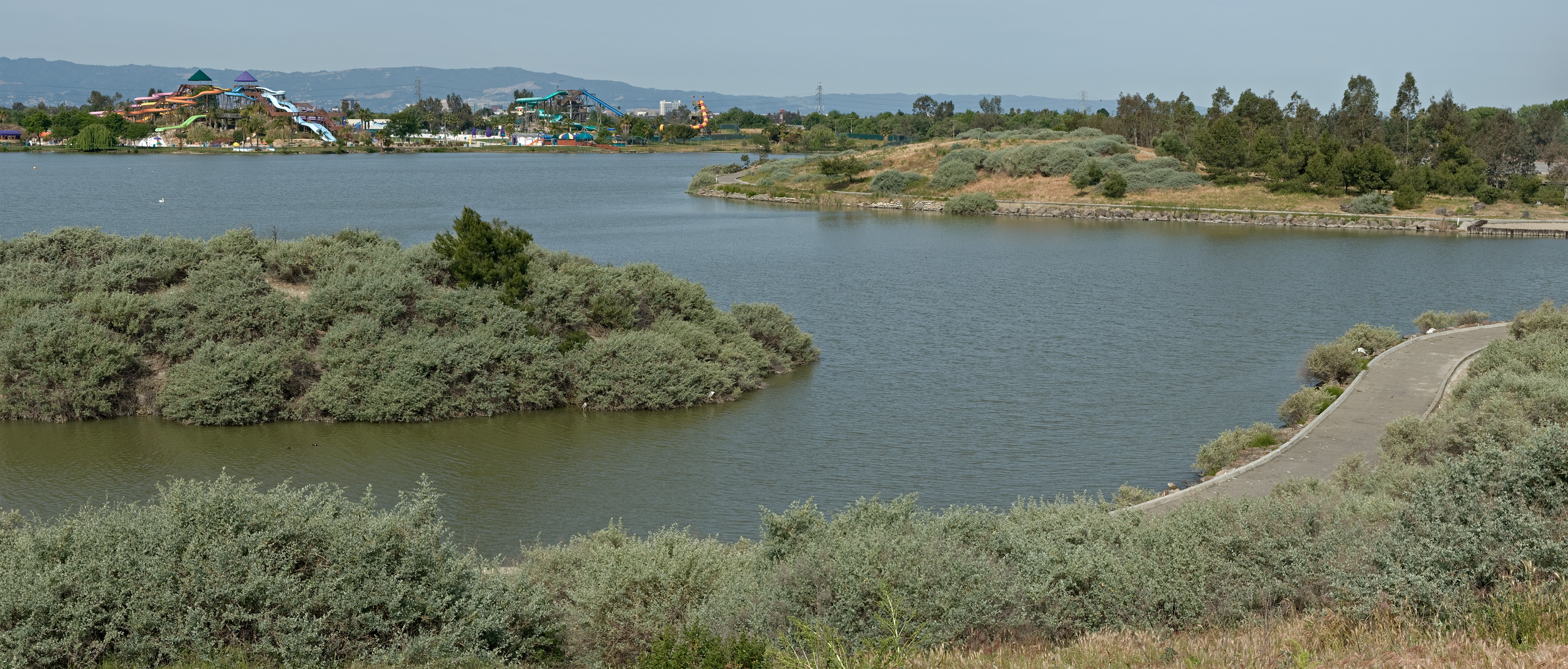
Lake Cunningham

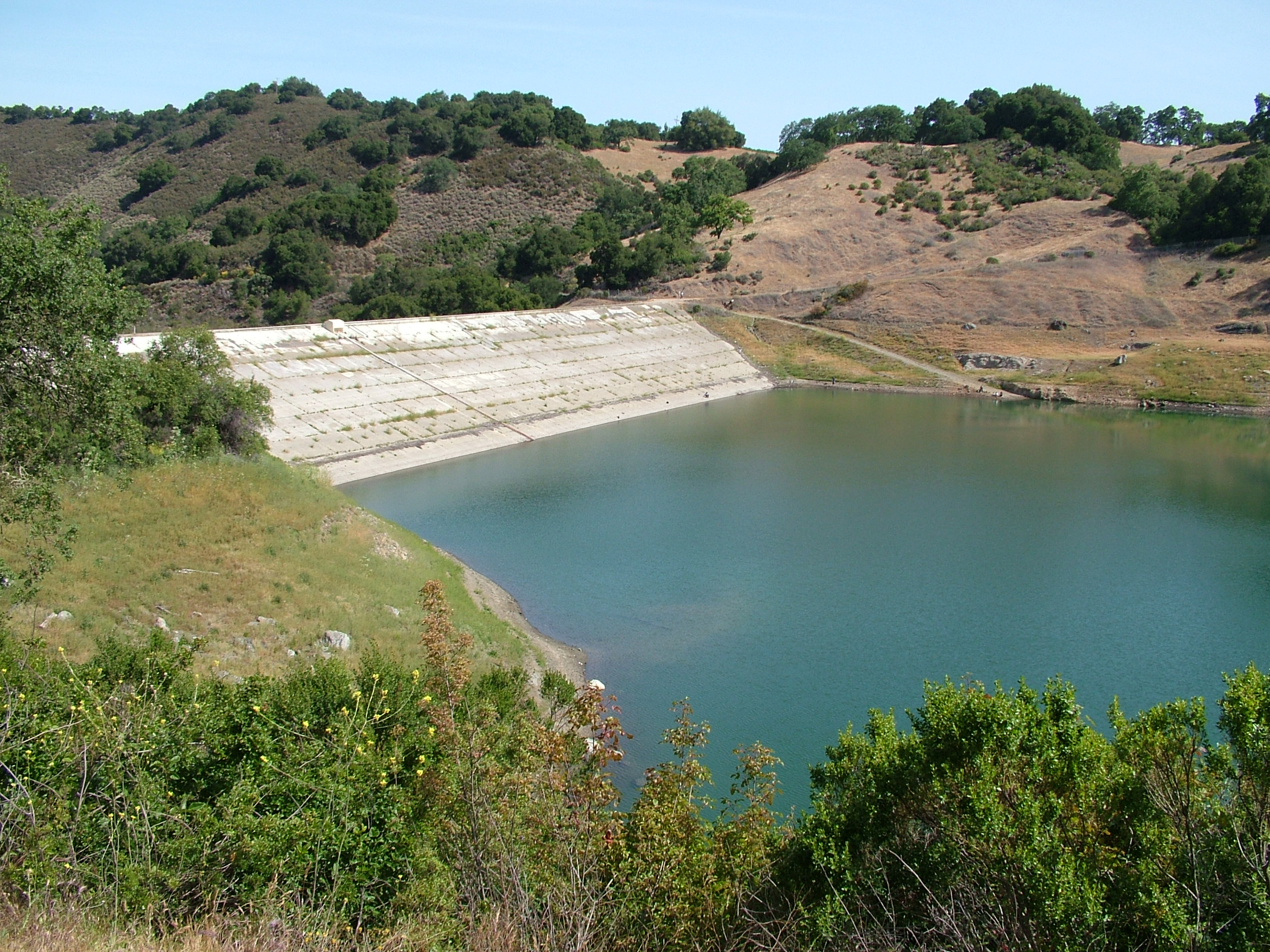
Guadalupe Reservoir

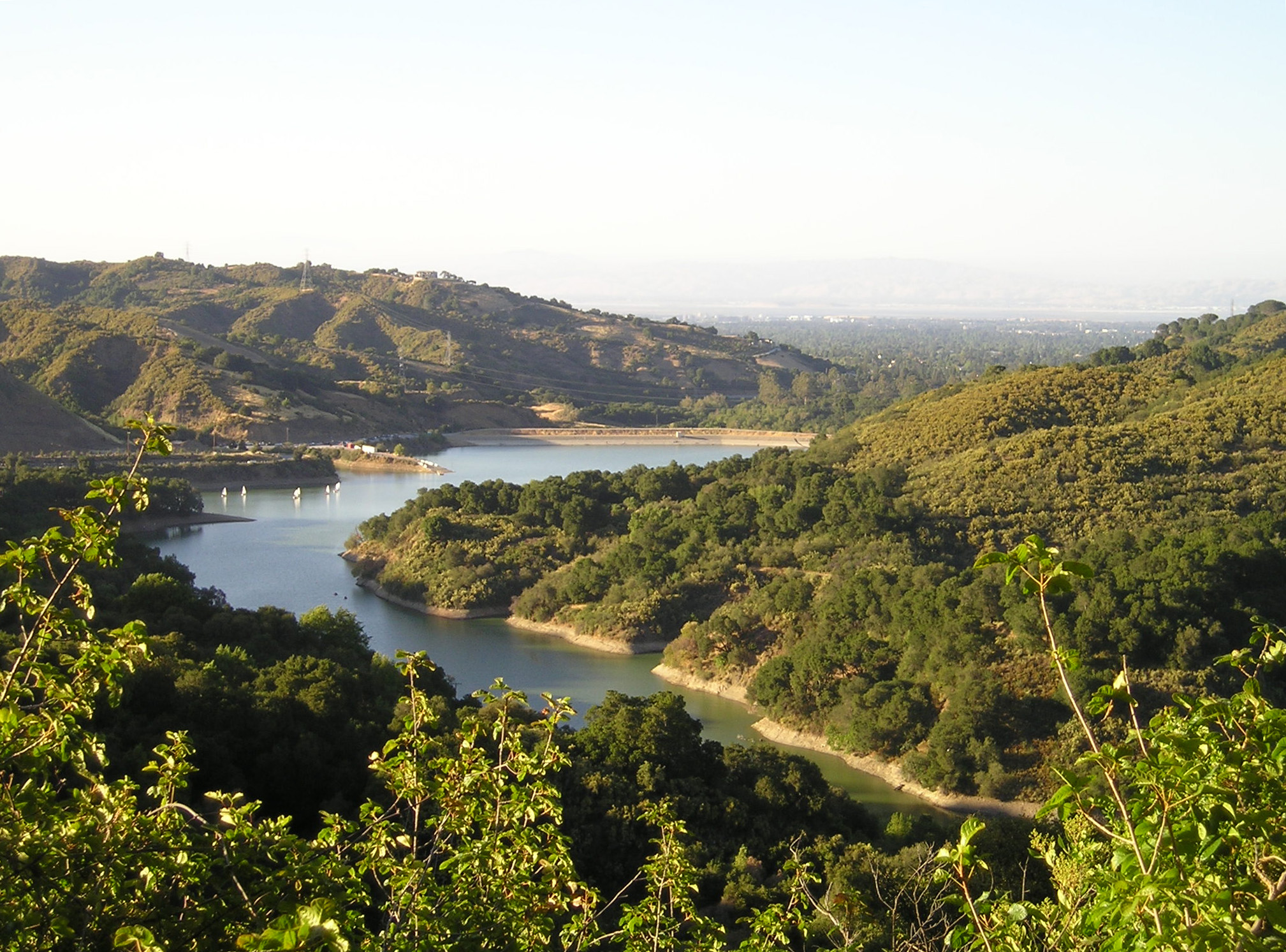
Stevens Creek Reservoir

- Almaden Reservoir (218156)
- Anderson Lake (218262)
- Borondo Lake (1828693)
- Bulhead Reservoir (220091)
- Calaveras Reservoir (220379) - partly in Alameda County.
- Calero Reservoir (220391)
- Cherry Flat Reservoir (220955)
- Chesbro Reservoir (220969)
- Lake Couzzens (1663982)
- Coyote Lake (221754)
- Lake Cunningham
- Lake Elsman (233849)
- Felt Lake (223434)
- Guadalupe Reservoir (233968)
- Halls Valley Lake (1663978)
- Hoover Lake (225552)
- Howell Reservoir (225713, 1663984)
- Lagunita (226786)
- Laguna Seca (1670811)
- Lexington Reservoir (227053)
- Lone Lake (227506)
- Los Alamitos Percolation Ponds (1835160)
- Lake McKenzie (1663980)
- Mud Lake (229231)
- Oak Springs Reservoir (229879)
- Pacheco Reservoir (230195)
- Lake Ranch Reservoir (226806)
- Sandy Wool Lake (1828680)
- Shaeirn Lake (232842)
- Shoreline Lake (1828480)
- Sprig Lake (235223, 1663994)
- Stevens Creek Reservoir (235454)
- Tisdale Reservoir (1835416)
- Tule Lake (236599)
- Uvas Reservoir (236945)
- Vasona Reservoir (237032)
- Williams Reservoir (237854)

== Solano County ==
- Lake Chabot (220871)
- Lake Dalwigk (1800164)
- Lake Frey (223945)
- Lake Herman (225203)
- Little Medora Lake (1666069)
- Lake Madigan (227915) - partly in Napa County.
- Medora Lake (228478)
- Pine Lake (230703)
- Puddy Lake (231081)
- Suisun Reservoir (235688)
- Summit Reservoir (1800081)
- Swanzy Reservoir (253953)
- Terminal Reservoir (1664671, 1664683)

== Sonoma County ==
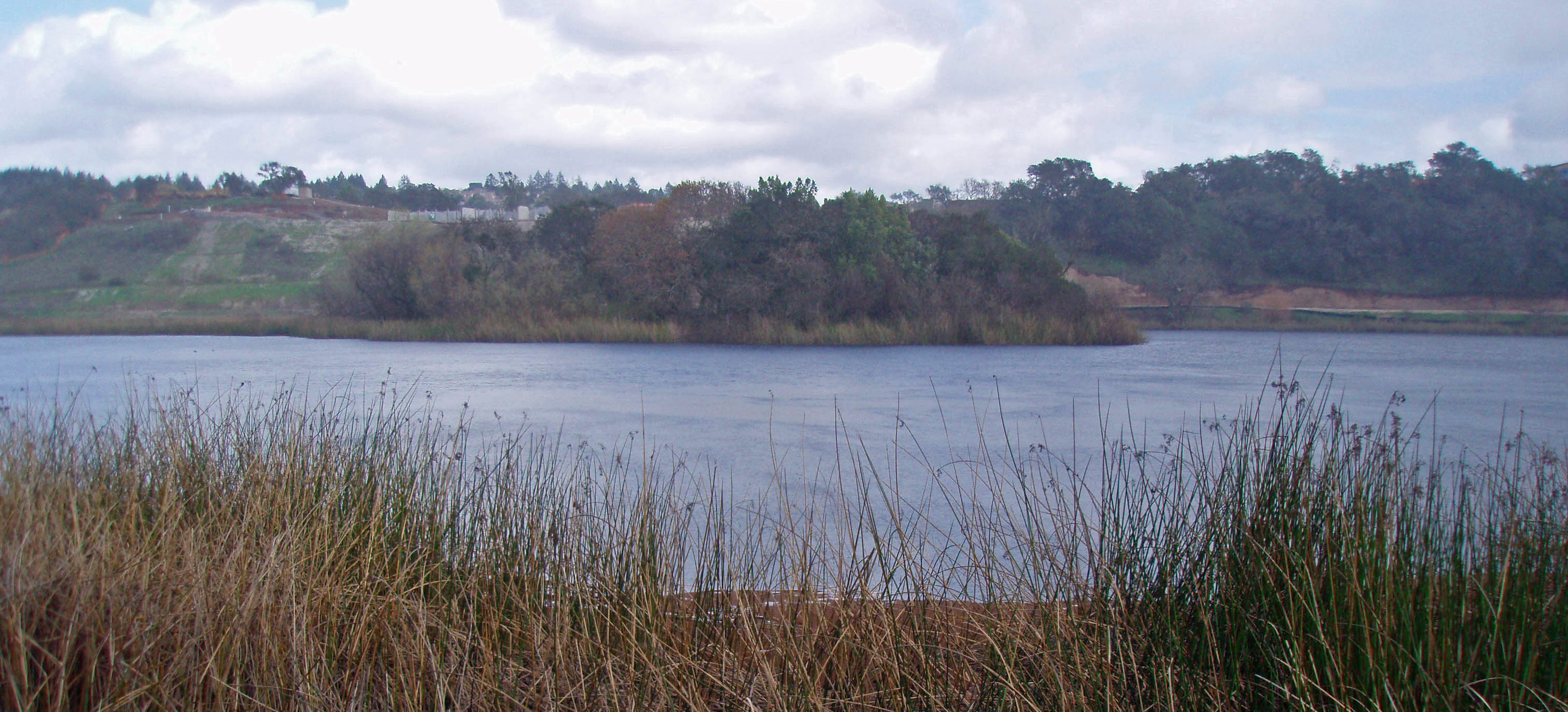
Fountaingrove Lake

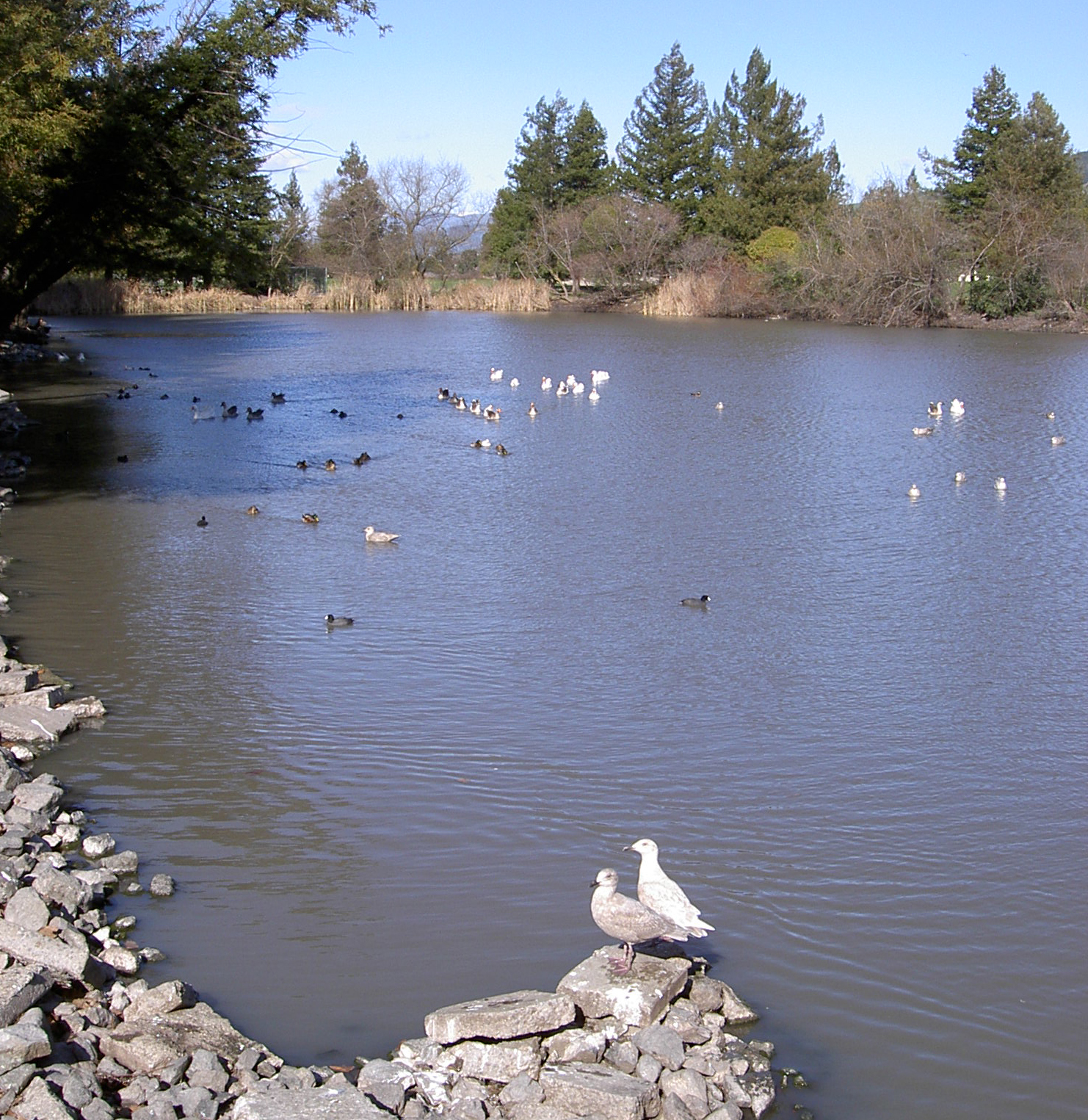
Roberts Lake

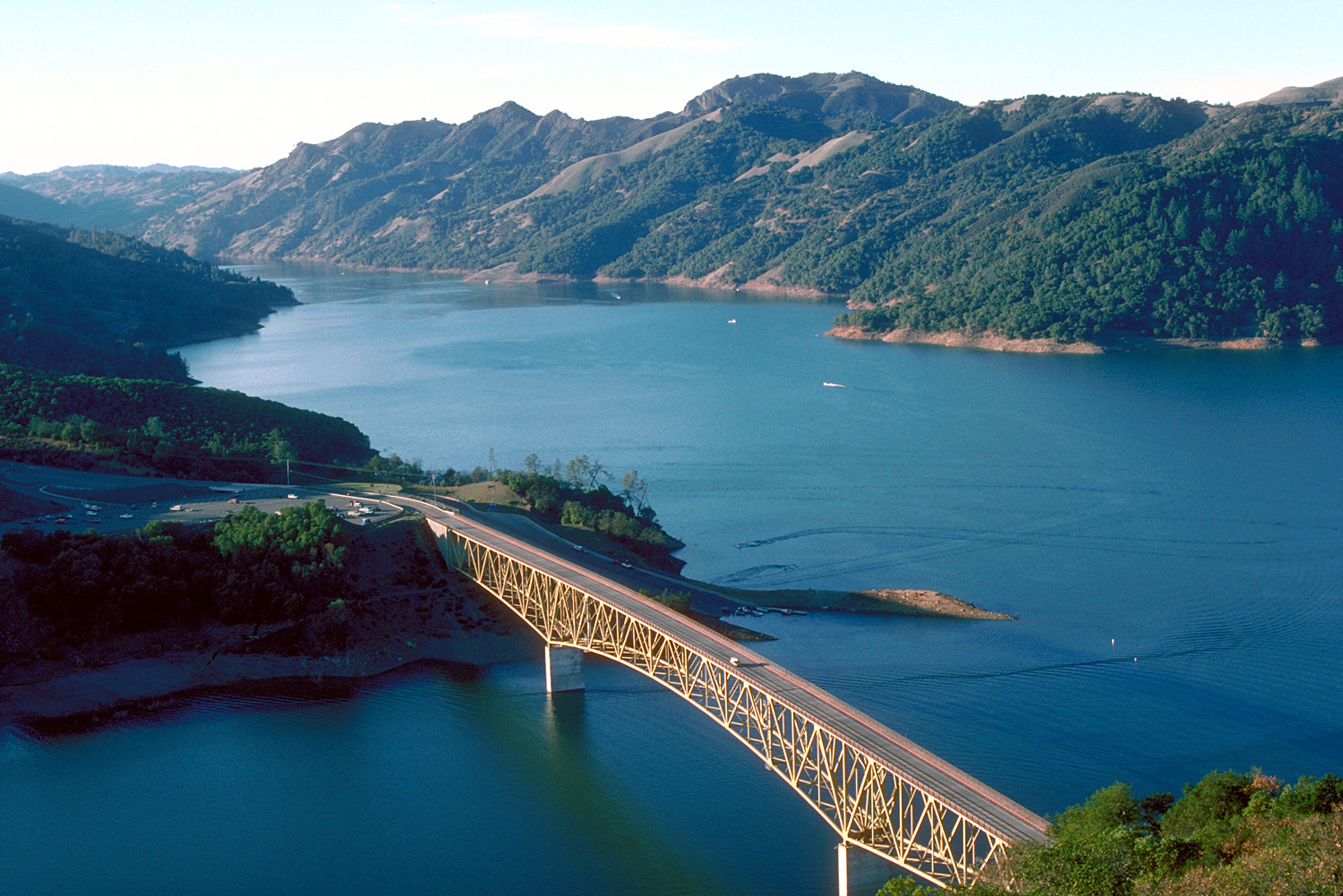
Lake Sonoma

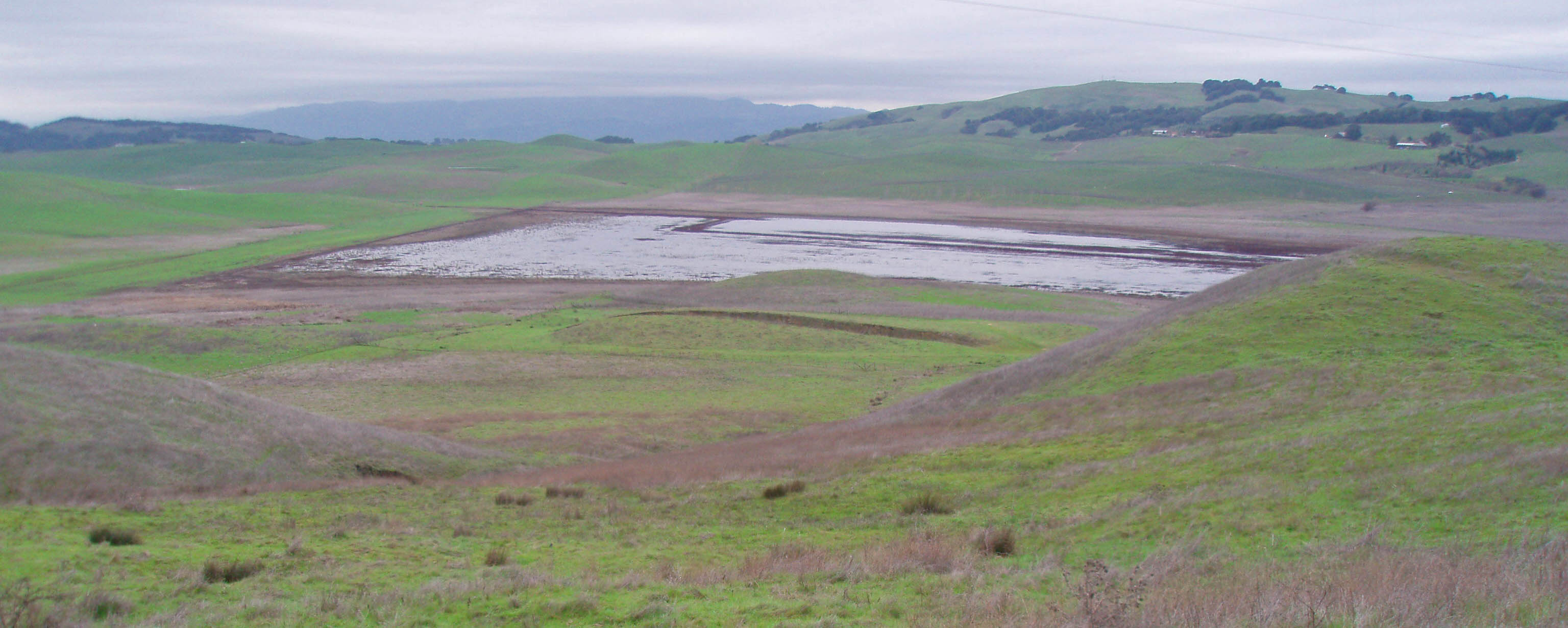
Tolay Lake

- Brush Creek Reservoir (1799324)
- Dugans Pond (222707)
- Fern Lake (223461)
- Fountaingrove Lake (1799345)
- Frog Lake (223955)
- Goose Lake (224324)
- Gravelly Lake (224494)
- Hedgpeth Lake (225115)
- Jenner Pond (1723328)
- Lake Idell (225827)
- Lake Ilsanjo (1799358)
- Lake Josephine (226358)
- Laguna Lake (226778) - partly in Marin County.
- Lee Lake (226993)
- Lake Lower (227801)
- Lytton Lake (1657220)
- Merlo Lake (1657222)
- Moonshine Pond (229013)
- Lake Oliver (230016)
- Onion Pond (1656965)
- Lake Orth (230120)
- Petaluma Reservoir (230559)
- Pine Creek Reservoir (230687)
- Preston Lake (231042)
- Lake Ralphine (231194)
- Matanzas Creek Reservoir (1799367)
- Redwood Lake (231441)
- Roberts Lake (1799646)
- Santa Rosa Creek Reservoir (232564)
- Lake Sonoma (234892)
- Lake Suttonfield (253226)
- Tolay Lake
- Toole Pond (236463)
- Vineyard Lake (1657224)

== See also ==
- Hydrography of the San Francisco Bay Area
- List of lakes in California
- List of reservoirs and dams in California
- List of watercourses in the San Francisco Bay Area
