= Duvall Lake =

- Location within California Location within the United States
- Location: Napa County, California
- Coordinates: 38°38′36″N 122°28′23″W
- Built: 1940
- Surface area: 17 acres (6.9 ha)

Duvall Lake is located in Pope Valley, east of the Napa Valley. It covers 17 acres (6.9 ha) and was completed in 1940.

The ranch was settled in the late 1860s by the Duvall family who came by covered wagon. During the construction of the lake, the owner of the ranch was Donald Duvall, but it was sold in the late 1950s. The last Duvall in the Napa Valley was Vernon Duvall, who moved to Loomis in 2003 to be closer to his daughter, Jeanne Duvall.

== See also ==
- List of dams and reservoirs in California
- List of lakes in California
- List of lakes in the San Francisco Bay Area
