= Rector Reservoir =

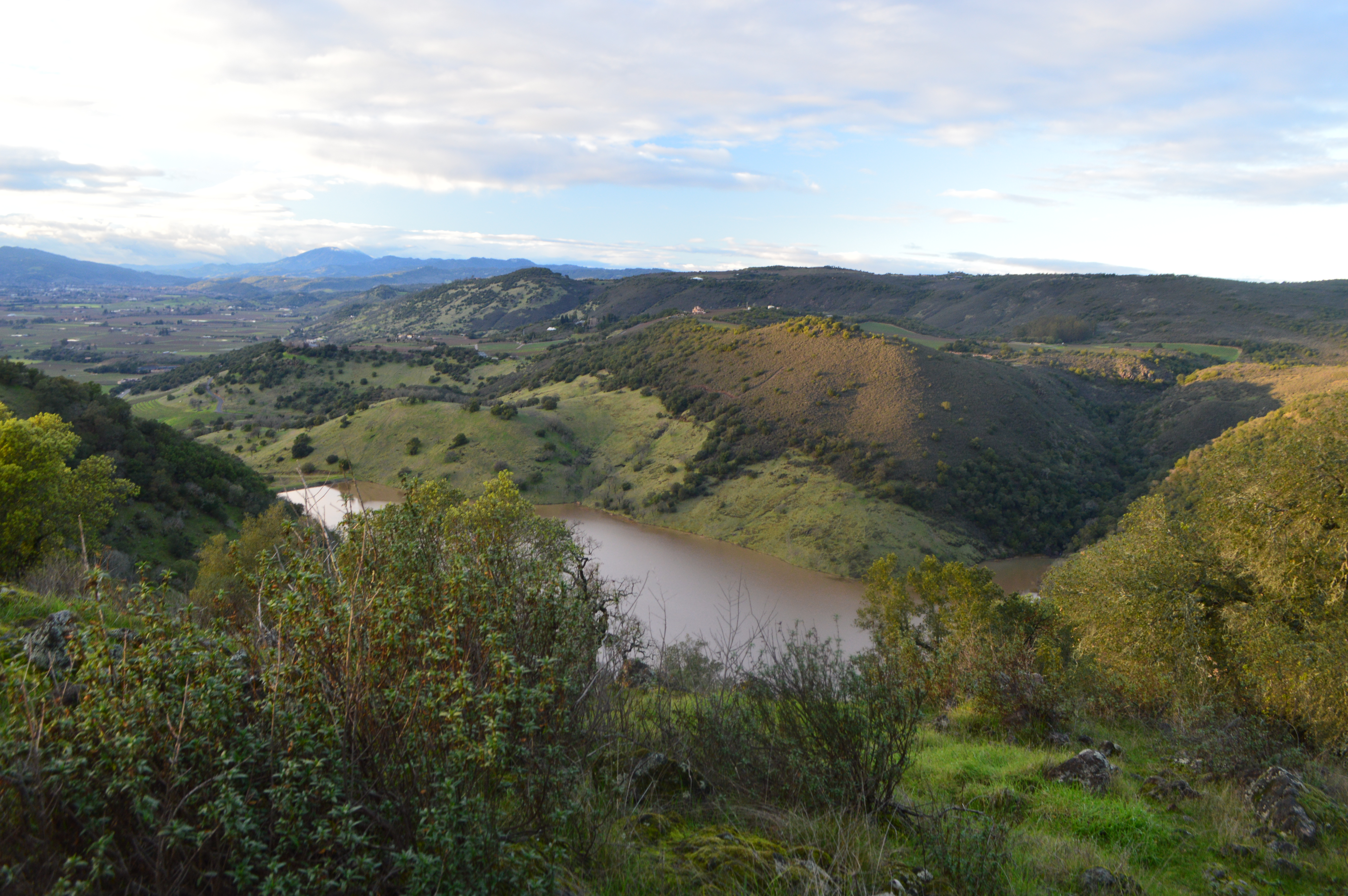

- Location within California Location within the United States
- Location: Napa County, California
- Coordinates: 38°26′30″N 122°20′19″W
- Type: Reservoir
- Primary inflows: Rector Creek
- Primary outflows: Rector Creek
- Catchment area: 10.7 square miles (28 km^{2})
- Basin countries: United States
- Managing agency: State Department of Veterans Affairs
- Built: 1946
- Surface area: 82 acres (33 ha)
- Water volume: 4,587 acre-feet (5,658,000 m^{3})
- Surface elevation: 374 feet (114 m)

Rector Reservoir is a reservoir in Napa Valley, California. It is located to the northeast of Yountville, and southwest of Lake Berryessa and supplies water to Veterans Home of California Yountville. The Silverado Trail leads to the reservoir passing it from north to south to the west of the lake and Rector Canyon. To the west is Silver Oak Cellars and Oakville.

The waters of the reservoir are impounded by Rector Creek Dam, which was built in 1946 across Rector Creek.

== Flora and fauna ==
The reservoir forms part of the 340 acre Rector Reservoir Wildlife Area, which has 27 species of mammals, 40 species of birds, and 14 species of reptiles and amphibians. Wildlife recorded here include the prairie and peregrine falcon, Cooper's and sharp-shinned hawks, red-legged frogs, and northwestern pond turtles.

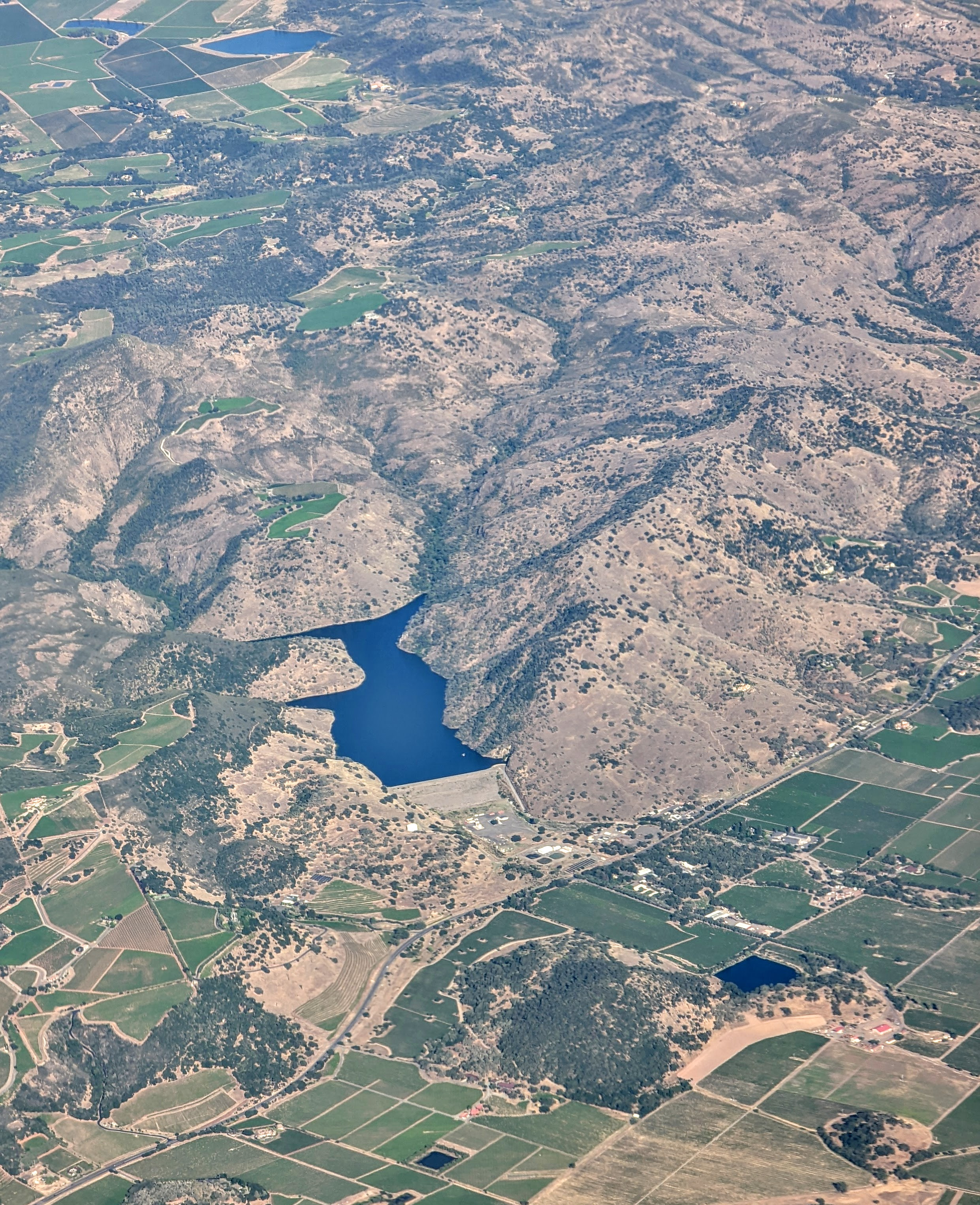
Aerial view of Rector Reservoir

== See also ==
- List of lakes in California
- List of lakes in the San Francisco Bay Area
