= Chileno Creek =

- Location of the mouth of Chileno Creek in California

Location
- Country: United States
- State: California
- Region: Marin County
- District: West Marin

Physical characteristics
- Source: Laguna Lake
  - coordinates: 38°12′28″N 122°45′53″W
  - elevation: 226 ft (69 m)
- Mouth: Confluence with Walker Creek
  - coordinates: 38°12′44″N 122°51′35″W
  - elevation: 62 ft (19 m)
- Length: 6.25 mi (10.06 km)

Chileno Creek is a stream in western Marin County, California, United States. It originates west of Petaluma, California at 220-acre Laguna Lake which straddles Marin and Sonoma Counties, from which it flows west 6.25 kilometres (3.88 mi) before joining Walker Creek, a tributary of Tomales Bay.

== History ==
Chileno Creek is named for Chilean immigrants who settled the Chileno Valley, with encouragement from Adrian Godoy.

Chileno Valley Ranch was purchased by Carlo Martinoiya, an immigrant from Cevio, Switzerland from Henry Halleck in 1862. Henry Halleck served as General-in-Chief of all Union armies during the American Civil War and also served as President Abraham Lincoln's Chief of Staff. Carlo Martinoiya anglicized his name to Charles Martin and his great-great-granddaughter Sally Gale and her husband now run one of the ranches in the Chileno Valley. Several of the ranches in the watershed are maintained as agricultural land by the Marin Agricultural Land Trust (MALT).

== Watershed and course ==
The Chileno Creek watershed drains 20.25 square miles (52.4 km^{2}). The creek originates at Laguna Lake, a shallow natural lake at the head of the Chileno Valley. Although Laguna Lake is officially classified as a vernal pool, it retains some water year round. The Chileno Creek watershed ranges from 1,379 feet (420 m) to 62 feet (19 m) at Chileno Creek's confluence with Walker Creek.

A study of Chileno Creek hydrogeomorphology found that 30% of the sediment in the watershed is blocked by small stock pond dams, and that lack of sediment causes downstream erosion and slows riparian recovery. Most of its tributaries have one or more dams as well as the mainstem such that dam density, or number of dams per drainage area, is 0.76 square kilometres (0.29 sq mi).

== Ecology ==
In the early 1900s, coho salmon (Oncorhynchus kisutch) were abundant in Walker Creek, but were nearly extirpated apparently due to severe erosion and siltation secondary to overgrazing and logging operations. In 1975 D. W. Kelley performed a comprehensive investigation of steelhead trout (Oncorhynchus mykiss) and coho salmon populations. He found small numbers of steelhead young-of-the-year in all viable habitat areas in the watershed, but only eight coho near the confluence of Chileno and Walker Creek. In addition, the Soulajule Reservoir dam blocked all anadromous salmonid fish migration to Arroyo Sausal. California Department of Fish and Game (CDFG) began planting coho salmon from Olema Creek into Walker Creek in 2003 with modest success. In 2008 and again in 2013 coho returned to Walker Creek, Salmon Creek and Frink Canyon.

Laguna Lake is used extensively by migrating and breeding waterfowl, including whistling swans (Cygnus columbianus) in winter.

== See also ==
- Tomales Bay
