= Soulajule Reservoir =

Reservoir in California, US

- Arroyo Sausal Reservoir
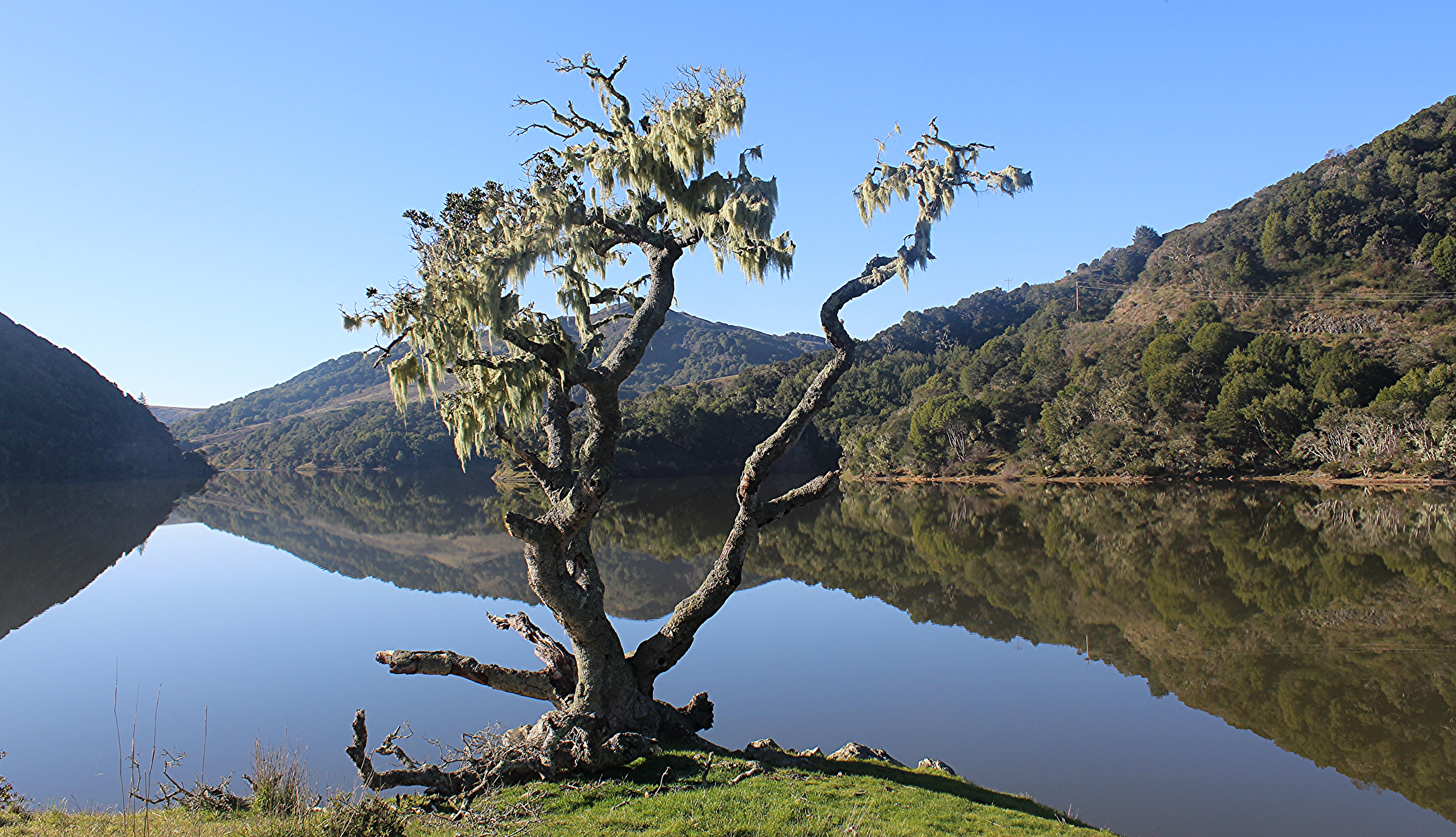
- The Soulajule Reservoir in 2016
- Interactive map of Soulajule Reservoir
- Location: Marin County, California
- Coordinates: 38°08′53″N 122°46′47″W
- Type: Reservoir
- Primary inflows: Arroyo Sausal
- Managing agency: Marin Municipal Water District
- Built: 1979
- Water volume: 10,572 acre-feet (13,040,000 m^{3})

Soulajule Reservoir (Spanish: Soo-lɑː-huː-liː) is a reservoir in northwestern Marin County, California. It is located about 4.5 miles southwest of the border with Sonoma County, and about 5.5 miles northeast of Point Reyes Station. It was built in 1979 with the construction of the earth-fill Soulajule Dam along Arroyo Sausal, a tributary of Walker Creek.

== History ==
The land upon which Soulajule Reservoir is built was purchased January 1, 1979 for $1,648,224. The lake was constructed within the same year. Mercury poisoning has been an issue in the Reservoir, especially since the 1982 winter storms and floods sent 170 pounds of mercury from an abandoned mine site into the creek. In 2017–2018, Marin County approved a $124,000 phase III to develop a plan to manage the mercury levels.

== Operation ==
The Marin Municipal Water District is currently working on an electrification project for the Soulajule Reservoir pump station, that could pump water to Nicasio Reservoir without requiring the water district to rent a generator. In January 2025, it was decided to instead build a pipeline to remove water.

== Recreation ==
Soulajule Reservoir is open to the public 7 days a week from sunrise to sunset. The most common fish in the reservoir is bass. There are also limited hiking trails around the lake, although most of the lake is surrounded by private land. Boating and swimming in the lake is prohibited.
