= Laguna Lake (California) =

Lake in the state of California, United States

- Lago de la Laguna (Spanish)
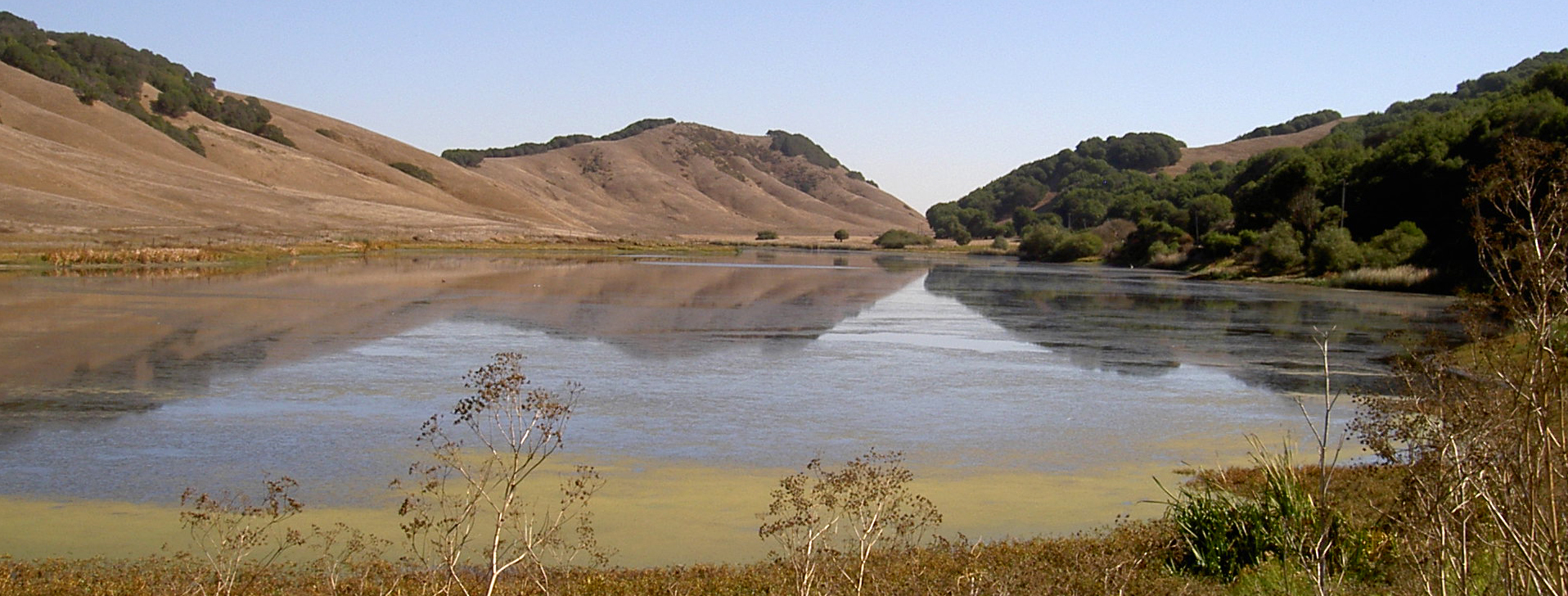

- Location within California Location within the United States
- Location: Sonoma and Marin counties, California
- Coordinates: 38.214363°N 122.747767°W
- Type: intermittent lake
- Primary outflows: Chileno Creek
- Basin countries: United States
- Max. length: 2 miles (3 km)
- Max. width: 0.5 miles (1 km)
- Surface area: 200 acres (81 ha)
- Surface elevation: 226 ft (69 m)
- Settlements: Petaluma, California

Laguna Lake is a shallow natural lake at the head of the Chileno Valley. It retains some water year round. The 200 acres (81 ha) lake is 0.5 miles (1 km) wide and 2 miles (3 km) long, straddling the Sonoma-Marin county line in northern California, United States. It is the source of Chileno Creek which flows 10 kilometres (6.2 mi) west to Walker Creek.

It was included in the Rancho Laguna de San Antonio Mexican land grant, which was given to Bartolomé Bojorquez in 1845.

Laguna Lake is used extensively for migrating and breeding waterfowl and Agriculture.

== See also ==
- List of lakes in California
- List of lakes in the San Francisco Bay Area
