= Pelican Lake (California) =

Lake in the state of California, United States

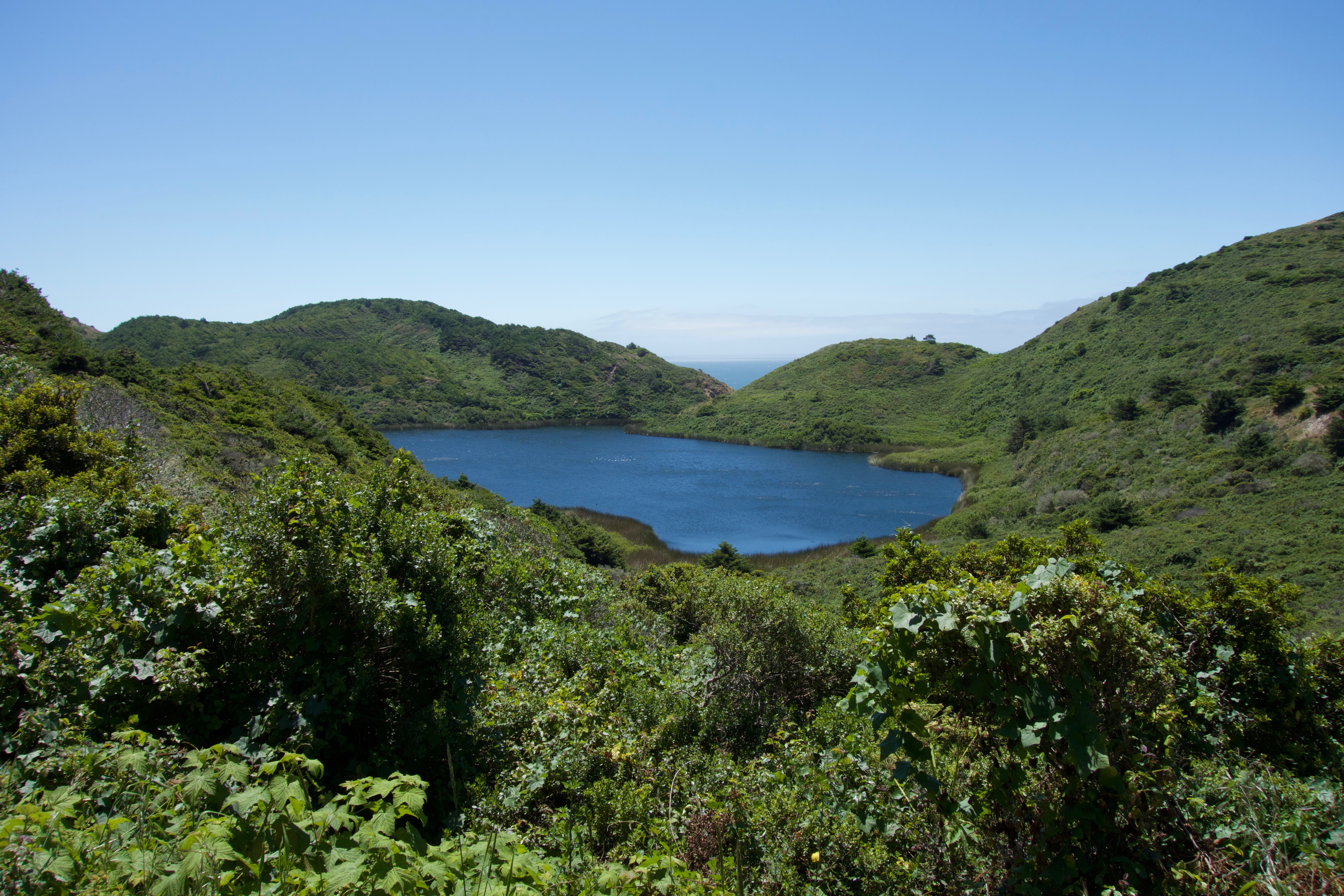
- Pelican Lake seen from the Palomarin Trail near Alamere Falls.

- Location within California Location within the United States
- Location: Marin County, California
- Coordinates: 37°57′01″N 122°46′31″W
- Type: slightly saline slightly alkaline slightly eutrophic warm monomictic
- Primary outflows: via Pelican Lake Creek to Pacific Ocean
- Basin countries: United States
- Average depth: 30 feet (9 m) in July 1969
- Surface elevation: 203 feet (62 m)

Pelican Lake is a small lake in the southern portion of the Point Reyes National Seashore, northwest of Bolinas. The lake sits at an elevation of 203 feet (62 m) and has an outflow via the short Pelican Lake Creek southwest through a notch in the coastal cliffs onto Double Point's Bolsa Beach. Pelican Lake is one of the five Coast Trail Lakes, along with Bass Lake, Crystal Lake, Ocean Lake and Wildcat Lake. Alamere Falls is about 0.5 miles (0.8 km) to the northwest.

== Geology ==
As with the other nearby lakes in the southeast portion of the Point Reyes peninsula, Pelican Lake occupies a natural synclinal depression formed behind blocks of rock displaced by landslides within the past 10,000 years. The depressions forming Crystal, Pelican and Bass lakes appear to have been caused by the Double Point Slide, which covers an area of about 1.7 square miles (4.4 km^{2}). The rocks involved in the landslide are shale, chert and sandstone, some similar to Miocene rocks of the Monterey Formation and others to Pliocene rocks from the Central Coast Ranges. The process that caused these slides is ongoing, with several nearby slides caused by the 1906 San Francisco earthquake and others as recently as 1956.

Prior to geological research in the 1960s, the area was considered to be sufficiently stable for the United States Army to construct an underground artillery control facility within the North Point headland directly west of Pelican Lake in 1944. These concrete structures were filled in by the National Park Service after it assumed control of the area, but could be exposed by future landslides.

== Ecology ==
The lake is within the Southern Inverness Ridge region of the Point Reyes National Seashore, in an area of coastal scrub and grassland. In this coastal zone there are open stands of coyote brush (Baccharis pilularis), often with native grasses such as California oatgrass (Danthonia californica) and purple needlegrass (Nassella pulchra). The other dominant plants in this ecosystem are California sage brush (Artemisia californica), black sage (Salvia mellifera), sticky monkeyflower (Mimulus guttatus), poison oak (Toxicodendron diversilobum), California coffeeberry (Frangula californica) and tree lupine (Lupinus arboreus).

Around Pelican Lake and the neighboring lakes are thick growths of willow (Salix sp.) In the lake margins can be found common tule (Schoenoplectus acutus), California bulrush (Schoenoplectus californicus), cat-tail (Typha latifolia) and sedges (Carex sp. including Carex senta). The lake has been stocked with warm-water game fish.

On the slopes above the coastal lakes, the flora is characterized by stands of Douglas fir (Pseudotsuga menziesii).

Pelican Lake is adjacent to the 86-acre (35 ha) Double Point Area of Special Biological Significance, established in 1974 primarily to protect the large population of harbor seals (Phoca vitulina) that raise pups on the beach between April and June each year.

== See also ==
- List of lakes in the San Francisco Bay Area
- List of lakes in California

== Sources ==
- Clague, John Joseph (March 1969). The landslides in the southeast part of Point Reyes National Seashore (M.A.). University of California, Berkeley.
- Clague, John Joseph (July 1969), Landslides of Southern Point Reyes National Seashore, vol. 22, California Geological Survey Mineral Information Service, pp. 107–110, 116–118, archived from the original on 17 September 2016
- "Coast Trail Lakes, Point Reyes National Seashore, California, USA". lakelubbers.com.
- Double Point, Marin County: California marine waters areas of special biological significance reconnaissance survey report, Water Quality Monitoring Reports, Sacramento: California State Water Resources Control Board, Surveillance and Monitoring Section, May 1979
- "Pelican Lake". Geographic Names Information System. United States Geological Survey, United States Department of the Interior. 19 January 1981.
- Schirokauer, David; Keeler-Wolf, Todd; Meinke, John; van der Leeden, Pam (December 2003), Plant Community Classification and Mapping Project Final Report (PDF), archived from the original (PDF) on 16 September 2016
- "Fire Ecology – Vegetation Types: Vegetation Map". National Park Service.
- Widmer, Carl (1979), "A Limnological Survey of Bass Lake, Point Reyes National Seashore, 1976", Proceedings of the First Conference on Scientific Research in the National Parks, pp. 573–576
