= Salmon Creek (Walker River tributary) =

Stream in Marin County, California

- Salmon Creek downstream of Marshall Petaluma Bridge in September, 2026

- Location of the mouth of Salmon Creek in Marin County, California

Location
- Country: United States
- State: California
- Region: Marin County, California

Physical characteristics
- Source
  - location: Heads 1.7 miles (2.7 km) northwest of Red Hill
  - coordinates: 38°10′6.7″N 122°42′5″W
  - elevation: 866 ft (264 m)
- Mouth: Confluence with Arroyo Sausal to form Walker Creek
  - location: 2 miles (3.2 km) northeast of Three Peaks
  - coordinates: 38°9′41.7″N 122°46′52″W
  - elevation: 213 ft (65 m)

Salmon Creek is a 7.0-mile-long (11.3 km) westward-flowing stream in Marin County, California. Its confluence with Arroyo Sausal is the source of Walker Creek which flows to Tomales Bay and thence to the Pacific Ocean.

== History ==
Salmon Creek is one of over fifty creeks in California named for abundant salmon.

== Watershed and Course ==
The Salmon Creek watershed drains an area of 5.2 square miles (13 km^{2}).

== Ecology ==
Although large populations of federally endangered Central California Coast coho salmon (Oncorhynchus kisutch) evolutionary significant unit (ESU) and Central California Coast steelhead trout (Oncorhynchus mykiss) distinct population segment (DPS) populations were historically abundant in Walker Creek and its Salmon Creek and Arroyo Sausal tributaries, they have dramatically declined as a result of habitat degradation associated with increased sedimentation and high summer water temperatures from loss of riparian cover, largely related to logging and ranching.

The Gambonini Mercury mine (formerly Buena Suerta Mercury mine) drains to Salmon Creek and operated from 1964 to 1970.

== See also ==
- Tomales Bay
- Walker Creek
- List of rivers in California
