= Lake El Toyonal =

Lake in the state of California, United States

- Location within California Location within the United States
- Location: Contra Costa County, California
- Coordinates: 37°53′54″N 122°13′36″W
- Basin countries: United States
- Surface elevation: 930 feet (283 m)

Lake El Toyonal (Spanish: Lago El Toyonal) is a small lake in the San Pablo Reservoir in Contra Costa County, California (between Orinda and Berkeley).

== See also ==
- List of lakes in California
- List of lakes in the San Francisco Bay Area
