= Arroyo Sausal =

Stream in Sonoma County, California

Coordinates: 38°9′41.7″N 122°46′52″W

- Arroyo Sausal outflow below Soulajule Reservoir Dam in September, 2026

Location
- Country: United States
- State: California
- Region: Marin County, California

Physical characteristics
- Source
  - location: Heads 3.2 miles (5.1 km) southwest of Stafford Lake
  - elevation: 948 ft (289 m)
- Mouth: Confluence with Salmon Creek to form Walker Creek
  - location: 2 miles (3.2 km) northeast of Three Peaks
  - elevation: 213 ft (65 m)

Arroyo Sausal is a 12.8-mile-long (20.6 km) northwest-flowing stream in Marin County, California. Its confluence with Salmon Creek is the start of Walker Creek which flows to Tomales Bay and thence to the Pacific Ocean.

== History ==
Arroyo Sausal is named for the Spanish 'grove of willows'. The watershed was part of the historical Rancho Soulajule, a 10,898-acre (44.10 km^{2}) Mexican land grant given in 1844 by Governor Manuel Micheltorena to José Ramón Mesa.

== Watershed and Course ==
Soulajule Reservoir with grove of Douglas fir trees in background

Arroyo Sausal drains northwest through Canada Pomponio then west through Hicks Valley. After entering Soulajule Reservoir, it flows north 0.8 miles (1.3 km) to its confluence with Salmon Creek, and forms the beginning of the Walker Creek mainstem. The 310 acre Soulajule Reservoir drains a watershed of 18.7 square miles (48 km^{2}) and its perennial outflow is maintained to benefit salmonids.

== Ecology ==
Historically, Arroyo Sausal's headwaters supported half of the Walker Creek watershed's coho salmon (Oncorhynchus kisutch) and steelhead trout (Oncorhynchus mykiss). These two salmonid species are federally endangered Central California Coast coho salmon evolutionary significant unit (ESU) and federally threatened Central California Coast steelhead trout distinct population segment (DPS) populations. However, an earthen dam built by a rancher in 1960s and then replaced in 1979 by construction of Soulajule Dam and reservoir (pronounced "Soo-la-HOO-lee") blocked these anadromous salmonid runs, eliminating 19.9 miles (32.0 km) of spawning habitat in upper Arroyo Sausal.

== See also ==
- Tomales Bay
- Walker Creek
- List of rivers in California
