= Mono Hot Springs =

Campground in Fresno County, California

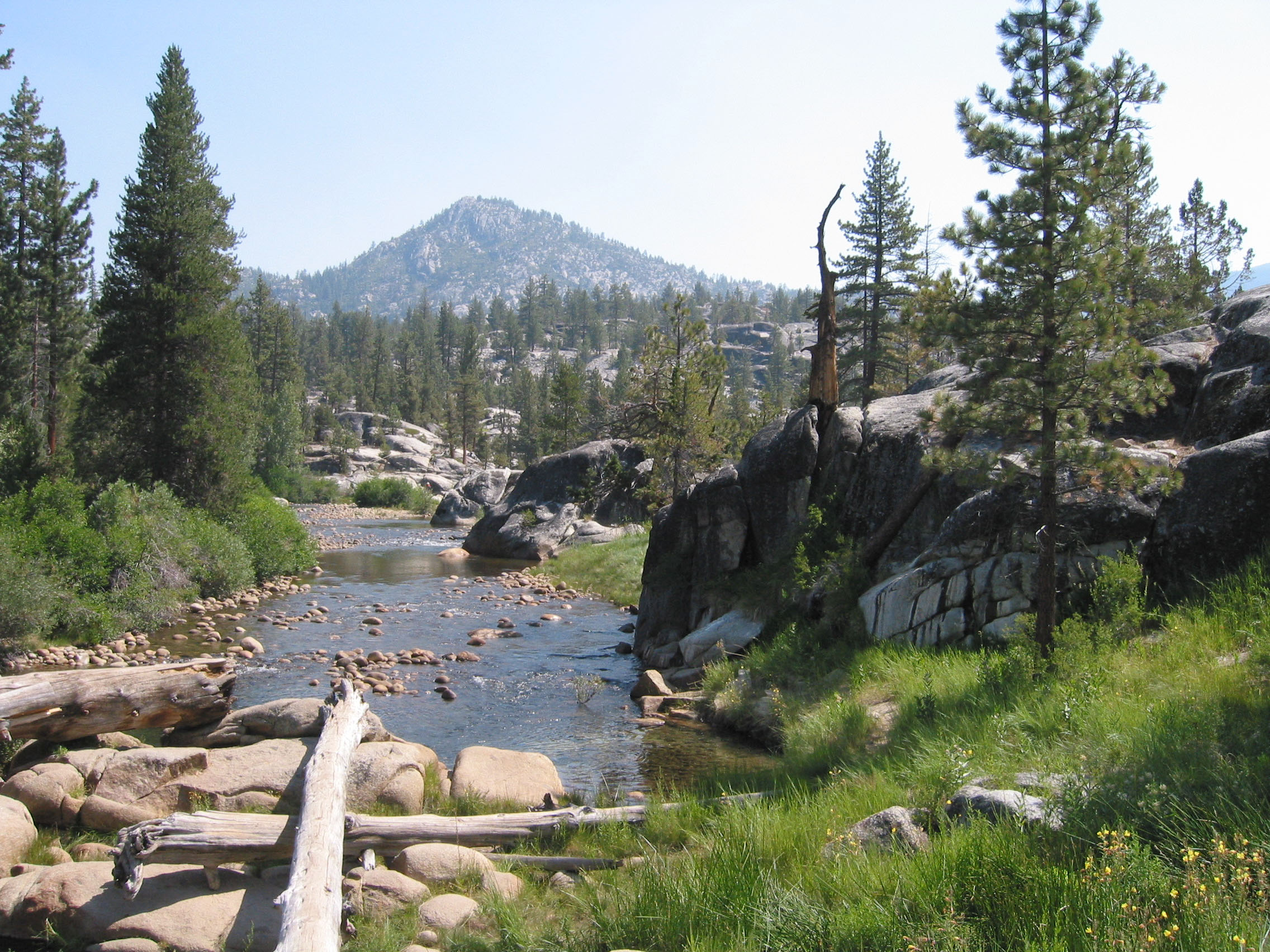

- Location within California Location within the United States
- Coordinates: 37°19′36″N 119°01′03″W
- Elevation: 6,562 feet (2,000 m)
- Temperature: 112 °F (44.4 °C)

Mono Hot Springs (formerly Lower Hot Springs and Lower Mineral Hot Springs) is a summer resort and campground at a group of hot springs in Fresno County, central California. It is located within the Sierra National Forest, 70 miles (110 km) northeast of Fresno via California State Route 168.

== History ==
The Mono Hot Springs post office was established in 1945. A general store and stone cabins are located at the rustic Mono Hot Springs Resort. The resort was built in 1935, a few years after Southern California Edison completed this section of the Kaiser Pass Road for the Big Creek Hydroelectric Project.

== Geography ==
Mono Hot Springs lies at an elevation of 6,562 feet (2,000 m), in the central Sierra Nevada. There are six separate hot springs, with the hottest 112 °F (44.4 °C). The public springs are on the hillside across the South Fork of the San Joaquin River from the campground and resort.

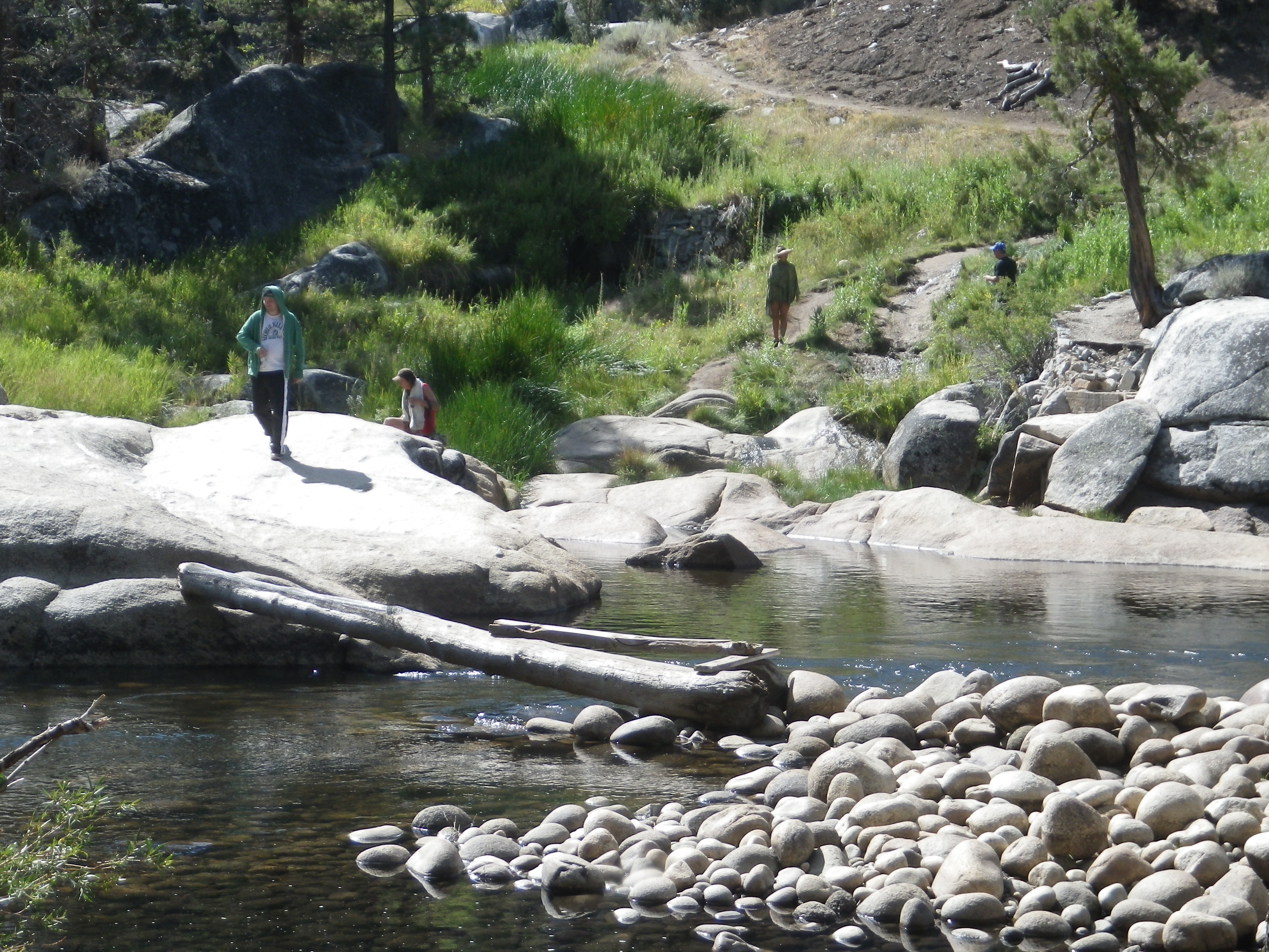
Mono Hot Springs has thermal pools that drain into the San Joaquin River. From the developed area one fords the river to get to the pools.

The locale is between Florence Lake and Lake Thomas A Edison reservoirs of the Big Creek Hydroelectric Project. It is reached via the forest service's Kaiser Pass Road, 17 miles (27 km) northeast from its start at Huntington Lake. The road crosses the 9,184 feet (2,799 m) Kaiser Pass before reaching the hot springs and reservoirs.

== Recreation ==
The Sierra National Forest's Mono Hot Springs Campground is located adjacent to the springs and resort, on the river. The Mono Creek Campground, is in the vicinity to the north, on a meadow along Mono Creek. Ward Lake and Jackass Meadow Campgrounds in the area.

Mono Hot Springs is a trailhead for hiking trails to local mountains, a volcanic plug, lakes, and to reach the Ansel Adams Wilderness area on the north and John Muir Wilderness area on the east.

== Natural history ==
Large rounded rock formations of Sierra granite predominate the terrain, rising above the vegetation and river.

== Flora ==
The Mono Hot Springs Evening-primrose, Camissonia sierrae subsp. alticola, is endemic and limited to this area and several sites in Yosemite National Park. It is listed on the California Native Plant Society Inventory of Rare and Endangered Plants of California.

Predominant trees in the surrounding forest include Sierra lodgepole pines (Pinus contorta subsp. murrayana) and Ponderosa pines (Pinus ponderosa).

== See also ==
- List of plants of the Sierra Nevada (U.S.)
