= South Fork San Joaquin River =

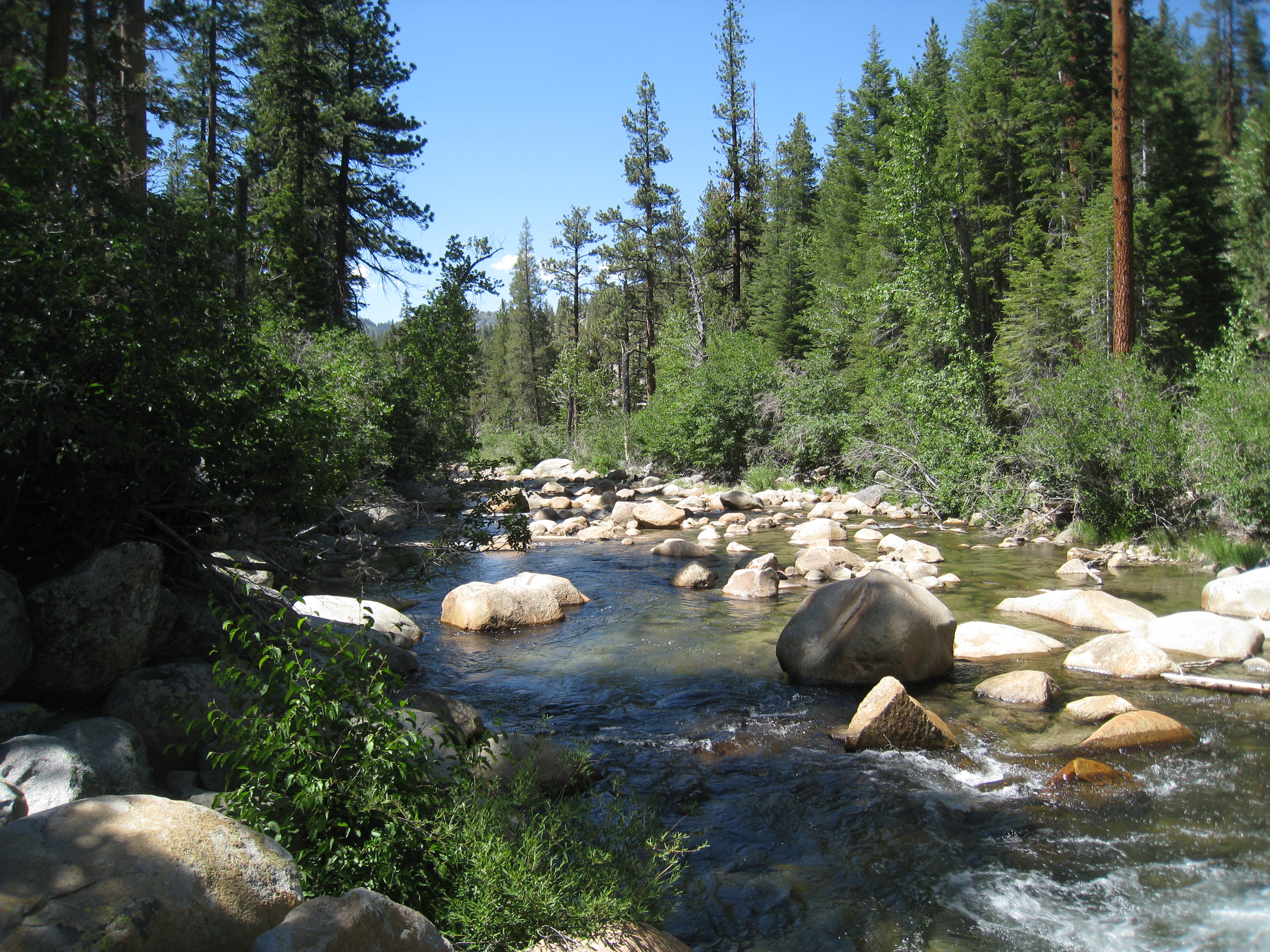
- South Fork below Florence Lake

- Location of South Fork San Joaquin River in California

Location
- Country: United States
- State: California

Physical characteristics
- Source: Martha Lake (California)
  - location: Kings Canyon National Park
  - coordinates: 37°05′39″N 118°43′16″W
  - elevation: 11,010 ft (3,360 m)
- Mouth: San Joaquin River
  - location: Ansel Adams Wilderness
  - coordinates: 37°26′13″N 119°14′36″W
  - elevation: 3,704 ft (1,129 m)
- Length: 48 mi (77 km)
- Discharge
  - location: Hoffman Meadow
  - average: 456 cu ft/s (12.9 m^{3}/s)
  - minimum: 8.5 cu ft/s (0.24 m^{3}/s)
  - maximum: 5,930 cu ft/s (168 m^{3}/s)

The South Fork San Joaquin River is the largest headwater of the San Joaquin River in central California, United States. About 48 miles (77 km) long, it drains an area of the high Sierra Nevada about 60 miles (97 km) northeast of Fresno.

== Course ==
The South Fork begins at Martha Lake, 11,010 ft (3,360 m) above sea level, near Mount Goddard in the northern section of Kings Canyon National Park in Fresno County. It flows northwest through the narrow Goddard Canyon, receiving Evolution Creek from the east, then leaves the park at the confluence with Piute Creek from the north, entering the Sierra National Forest. It then flows west, through Blayney Meadows, into Florence Lake, impounded by Florence Lake Dam. Below the dam it flows briefly north, receiving Bear Creek, before turning west again, through a wider valley past Mono Hot Springs then receiving its main tributary, Mono Creek, from the north. The South Fork enters the Ansel Adams Wilderness as it turns northwest, receiving Four Forks and Rube Creeks before crossing into Madera County. Soon after entering Madera County, it joins the San Joaquin River, in a deep granite canyon below Balloon Dome at San Joaquin river mile 334 (km 537), a short distance above Mammoth Pool Reservoir.

== River modifications ==
The Florence Lake Dam, as well as Vermillion Valley Dam on Mono Creek which forms Lake Thomas A. Edison, are both part of the Big Creek Hydroelectric Project operated by Southern California Edison to provide electricity to Los Angeles. In 1925, water was first diverted from the South Fork via the Ward Tunnel into Huntington Lake. The concrete multiple-arch Florence Lake dam was completed in 1926 to ensure a year-round water supply for the tunnel. The larger, earthen Vermillion Valley Dam was built much later, in 1953. The dams divert a considerable amount of water from the South Fork for power generation, especially during the late summer and fall when water flows are already naturally low.

== Recreation ==
The South Fork between Piute Creek and Florence Lake has a wide variety of difficulty levels for boating, ranging from a gentle, smooth meandering stream in the Blayney Meadows section to continuous Class VI to V+ whitewater in the last 2 miles (3.2 km) above Florence Lake, as well as a number of waterfalls that must be portaged. Below the Florence Lake Dam river flows are less reliable due to water diversions, except in years of particularly heavy snowmelt.

== See also ==
- List of rivers of California
