= Big Creek (San Joaquin River tributary) =

River in the Sierra Nevada, California

Coordinates: 37.21022°N 119.3304°W

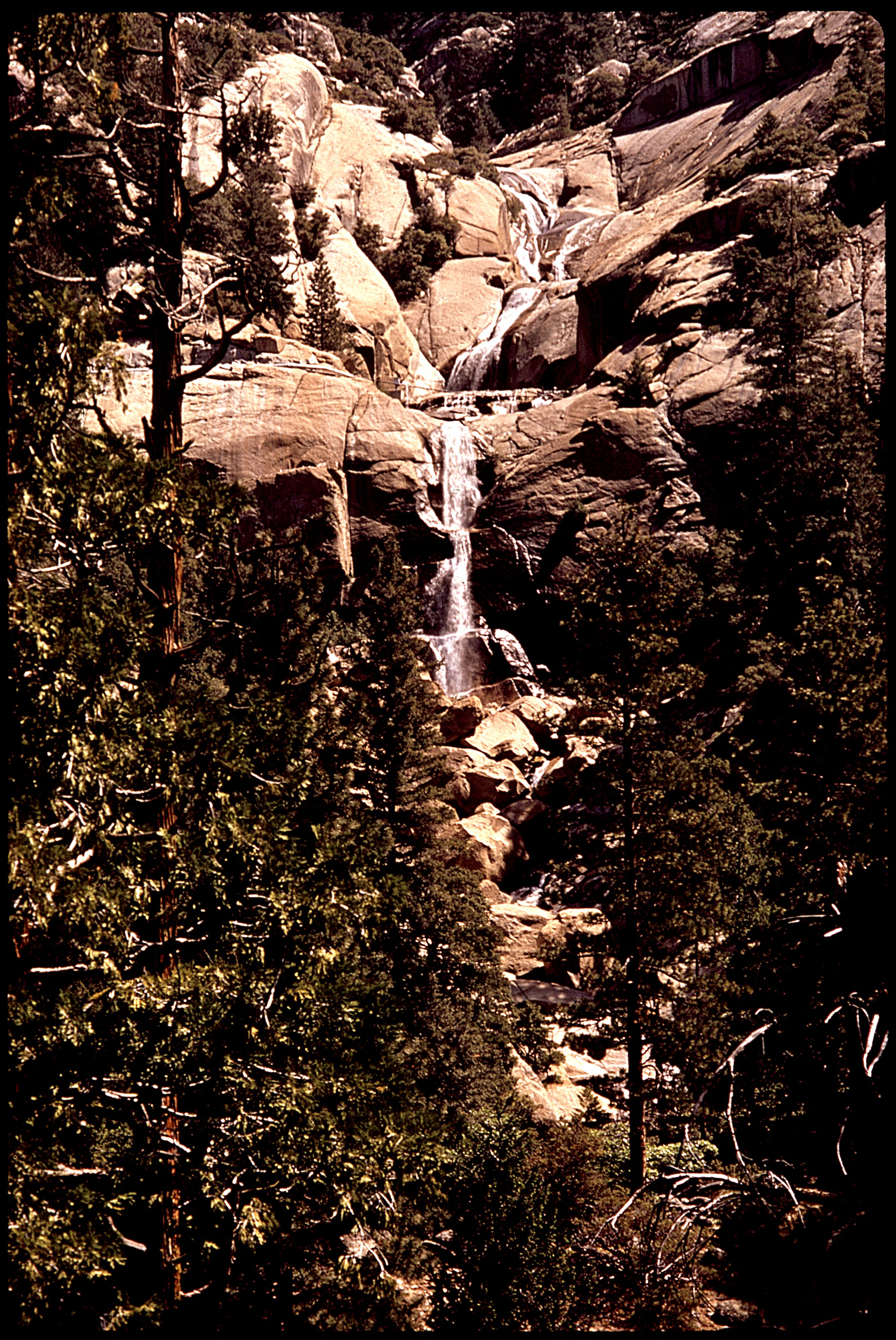
Big Creek, 1972

Big Creek is a 19.3-mile-long (31.1 km) tributary of the San Joaquin River in the Sierra Nevada, within the Sierra National Forest, central California.

The creek flows in Fresno County. The settlement of Big Creek is named for it, as was the 2020 Creek Fire, which started in the Big Creek drainage and became one of California's largest wildfires ever recorded.

== Big Creek Hydroelectric Project ==
The Big Creek Hydroelectric Project, one of the most extensive hydroelectric systems in the world, is partly located on Big Creek. It is owned by Southern California Edison.

There are nine power plants in the project: Portal, Eastwood, Mammoth Pool; and Big Creek 1, 2, 2A, 3, 4, and 8. Reservoirs in the project include Huntington Lake, Shaver Lake, Redinger Lake, Florence Lake, Lake Thomas A Edison, and Mammoth Pool Reservoir. The terminus of the system is the outlet of Big Creek 4, which discharges into the San Joaquin River several miles downstream from Redinger Dam.

The San Joaquin passes through many more powerhouses downstream, including A.G. Wishon and the powerhouse at Friant Dam.
