= Mammoth Pool Dam =

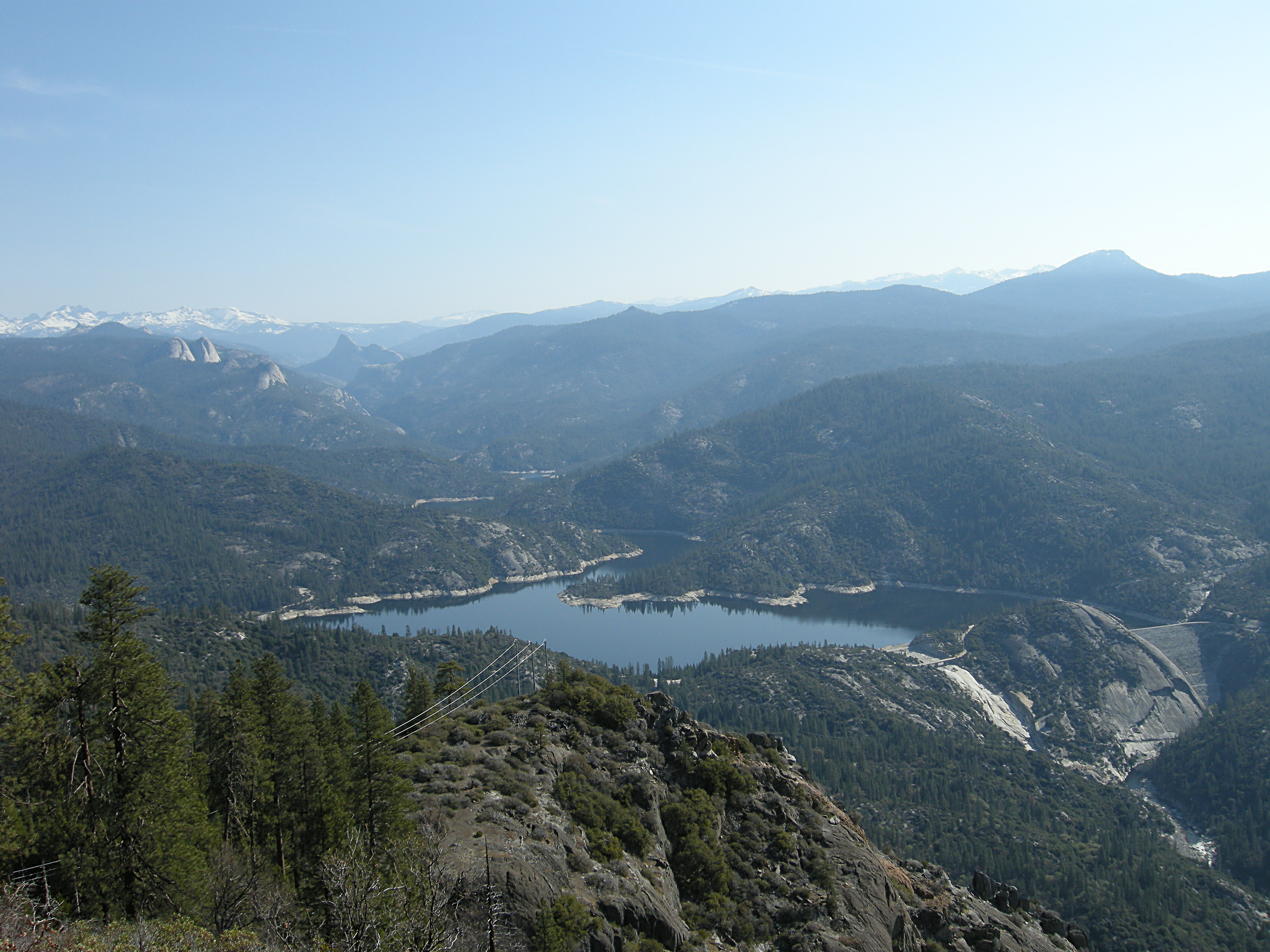

- Location of Mammoth Pool Dam in California
- Country: United States
- Location: Fresno / Madera counties, California
- Coordinates: 37°19′23″N 119°18′58″W
- Construction began: 1958; 68 years ago
- Opening date: 1959; 67 years ago

Dam and spillways
- Type of dam: Rockfill
- Impounds: San Joaquin River
- Height: 411 ft (125 m)
- Length: 820 ft (250 m)
- Width (crest): 30 ft (9.1 m)
- Width (base): 2,100 ft (640 m)
- Dam volume: 5,250,000 yd^{3} (4,010,000 m^{3})
- Spillways: Ungated overflow
- Spillway capacity: 170,000 cu ft/s (4,800 m^{3}/s)

Reservoir
- Creates: Mammoth Pool Reservoir
- Total capacity: 123,000 acre⋅ft (0.152 km^{3})
- Catchment area: 998 mi^{2} (2,580 km^{2})
- Surface area: 1,100 acres (450 ha)
- Normal elevation: 3,337 ft (1,017 m) (max)

Power Station
- Operator: Southern California Edison
- Hydraulic head: 1,004 ft (306 m)
- Turbines: 2x 95 MW
- Installed capacity: 190 MW
- Annual generation: 517,987,000 kWh (2001–2012)

Mammoth Pool Dam is a hydroelectric dam located on the San Joaquin River in the southern Sierra Nevada mountain range of California, about 45 miles (72 km) northeast of Fresno. It forms Mammoth Pool Reservoir and lies within the Sierra National Forest. The dam and reservoir were named after a large natural pool in the river that was once located above the present dam site.

== History ==
In 1900, engineer John S. Eastwood and several wealthy investors founded the Mammoth Power Company with the goal of harnessing hydroelectric power from the upper San Joaquin River. The Mammoth Pool site, where the San Joaquin River canyon chokes down to a narrow gap between massive walls of solid granite, was immediately seen as an attractive dam site. The company's first proposal was to construct a rockfill diversion dam that would send water into a 20-mile (32 km)-long tunnel, developing a hydraulic head of over 1,700 feet (520 m) to supply a 120,000 hp powerhouse. However, the investors involved with Mammoth eventually lost interest due to the enormous scope of the project. By 1901, the Mammoth Pool proposal was shelved.

During the mid-1950s, development of hydroelectric facilities in the upper San Joaquin basin began to pick up again and plans were finalized for the construction of Mammoth Pool and its associated power station. Construction of the main dam embankment started in October 1958 after the San Joaquin River was diverted through a 2,150-foot (660 m)-long tunnel to bypass the dam site. Work progressed fairly quickly, although the builders ran into problems with exfoliation of granite sheets, probably caused by drilling and explosive charges along the steep walls of the gorge. The dam was topped out almost exactly one year later in late 1959.

== Purpose ==
The dam serves mainly for the generation of hydroelectric power. It is an important component of Southern California Edison's Big Creek Hydroelectric Project, which comprises a system of 25 dams, nine power plants and supporting tunnels and diversion channels in the upper basin of the San Joaquin River. Water from the reservoir is diverted into a 7.45-mile (11.99 km)-long reinforced concrete penstock into Mammoth Pool Powerhouse, which has two 100,000 hp turbines totaling a nominal generating capacity of 190 megawatts (MW). Due to friction decreasing flow rate in the power tunnel, the actual output during maximum generation is only about 187 MW. A 350 ft (110 m) high surge chamber is located shortly above the powerhouse to provide protection to the turbines in case of abrupt flow fluctuations through the tunnel. The 1,004 ft (306 m) hydraulic head afforded to the power plant is almost three times greater than the dam's structural height.

== Dimensions ==
Mammoth Pool is a rockfill structure standing 411 feet (125 m) above the foundations and 820 feet (250 m) long. The dam rises for 330 ft (100 m) above the bed of the San Joaquin River, and contains about 5,250,000 yd^{3} (4,010,000 m^{3}) of material. The crest is situated at an elevation of 3,361 ft (1,024 m) and is approximately 30 ft (9.1 m) wide. The dam's base, by contrast, is more than 2,100 ft (640 m) thick.

The reservoir formed behind the dam has a conservation storage of 119,940 acre⋅ft (0.14794 km^{3}), a maximum capacity of 123,000 acre⋅ft (0.152 km^{3}), and can reach elevations of 3,337 ft (1,017 m) above sea level. Normal water releases from the dam are controlled by a cone (Howell-Bunger) valve with a capacity of 2,100 cu ft/s (59 m^{3}/s) at maximum pool. Any higher water will flow over an uncontrolled ogee crest spillway cut into the rock of the San Joaquin Canyon about a quarter of a mile to the west of the main dam. The spillway is 403 ft (123 m) wide and has a capacity of approximately 170,000 cu ft/s (4,800 m^{3}/s).

== Environmental impacts ==
Mammoth Pool Dam has caused the submersion of a migratory route commonly used by mule deer in the Sierra, forcing them to swim across the reservoir during their spring and autumn migrations. The reservoir is closed to all public use between May 15 to June 15 to prevent disturbance of the deer population.

During late summer and autumns of most years, nearly the entire flow of the San Joaquin River is diverted into the Mammoth Pool penstock, essentially drying up nearly 9 miles (14 km) of riverbed. This has resulted in severe declines in fish populations in the stretch between Mammoth Pool and Dam No. 6, where the outflow from the Mammoth Pool powerhouse is located.

== See also ==
- Big Creek (San Joaquin River)
- List of power stations in California
- List of reservoirs and dams in California
- List of the tallest dams in the United States
