= Kerckhoff Dam =

- Location within California
- Location: Fresno County, California, United States
- Coordinates: 37°07′41″N 119°31′31″W
- Purpose: Flood control, Electricity, Recreation
- Opening date: 1920
- Owner: Pacific Gas & Electric

Dam and spillways
- Type of dam: Concrete arch
- Impounds: San Joaquin River
- Height: 114 ft (35 m)
- Length: 495 ft (151 m)
- Elevation at crest: 994.5 ft (303.1 m)
- Dam volume: 22,000 yd^{3} (17,000 m^{3})

Reservoir
- Creates: Kerckhoff Reservoir
- Total capacity: 4,252 acre⋅ft (5,245,000 m^{3})
- Catchment area: 1,460 mi^{2} (3,800 km^{2})

Power Station
- Turbines: 3x 12.667 MW at Powerhouse No. 1; 1x 155.0 MW at Powerhouse No. 2
- Installed capacity: 193 MW
- Annual generation: 579,100,000 KWh
- Website http://www.fs.usda.gov/r05/sierra

Kerckhoff Dam is a concrete arch dam on the San Joaquin River in Fresno County, California, about 10 mi (16 km) southwest of Big Creek. The 114 ft (35 m) tall dam is a run-of-the-river facility impounding 4,252 acre⋅ft (5,245,000 m^{3}) of water and is the primary feature of Pacific Gas and Electric's Kerckhoff hydroelectric project. The dam and its 160-acre (65 ha) reservoir provide water for the Kerckhoff Powerhouses No. 1 and No. 2. Powerhouse No. 1 has three Francis turbines producing a maximum of 38 megawatts (MW) and Powerhouse No. 2 has a single Francis turbine rated at 155 MW for a total project capacity of 193 MW. An annual 579.1 million KWh of electricity are generated here.

Completed in 1920, the dam and Powerhouse No. 1 were the first to utilize the San Joaquin River for hydroelectricity. The second powerhouse was added in 1983.

The dam, named for William George Kerckhoff, was part of the "Big Creek Hydroelectric Project", the largest construction project in the world in 1910.

== See also ==
- Big Creek Hydroelectric Project
- Crane Valley Project
