= Beasore Creek =

Stream in California, U.S.

Coordinates: 37°24′59″N 119°23′11″W

Beasore Creek is a stream in the U.S. state of California. It is located in Madera County. The stream is named after Tom Beasore, one of Fresno County's first deputy sheriffs and founder of the Jones store. It is a tributary of Chiquito Creek that flows into Mammoth Pool Reservoir.
