= Fish Creek Dam =

- U.S. National Register of Historic Places
- Location within Idaho Location within the United States
- Nearest city: Carey, Idaho
- Coordinates: 43°25′23″N 113°49′54″W
- Area: 5 acres (2.0 ha)
- Built: 1919
- Architect: John S. Eastwood
- NRHP reference No.: 78003437
- Added to NRHP: December 29, 1978

Fish Creek Dam in Blaine County, Idaho, is an aging multiple-arch concrete dam that has achieved historic status and now represents some threat to public safety, due to danger of it failing. It is listed on the National Register of Historic Places.

It is a 92-foot-high (28 m) concrete dam that is 1,700 feet (520 m) long, blocking Fish Creek in the lower ranges of the Pioneer Mountains. Located 11 miles (18 km) northeast of Carey, Idaho, the dam was completed in 1923 by John S. Eastwood.

The dam was listed on the National Register in 1978; the listing included just the one contributing structure on a 5-acre (2.0 ha) area.

In 2007, it was identified as one of the four highest-hazard dams in Idaho, having significant threat to human lives if it were to fail.
