= Big Creek, California =

- Census-designated place
- Location of Big Creek in Fresno County, California.

- Location in California
- Coordinates: 37°12′18″N 119°14′45″W
- Country: United States
- State: California
- County: Fresno

Area
  - Total: 0.46 sq mi (1.19 km^{2})
  - Land: 0.46 sq mi (1.19 km^{2})
  - Water: 0 sq mi (0.00 km^{2}) 0%
- Elevation: 4,984 ft (1,519 m)

Population (2020)
  - Total: 151
  - Density: 328.2/sq mi (126.73/km^{2})
- Time zone: UTC-8 (Pacific (PST))
  - Summer (DST): UTC-7 (PDT)
- ZIP Code: 93605
- GNIS feature ID: 1659696; 2628711

Big Creek (Big Creek Flats in the 1870s; Manzanita Park in 1902; until 1926, Cascada) is a small census-designated place in Fresno County, California, United States, located in the Sierra Nevada on the north bank of Big Creek. It lies at an elevation of 4,984 feet (1,519 m) above sea level. As of the 2020 census, Big Creek had a population of 151. The ZIP code is 93605, and the community is served by area code 559.

== History ==
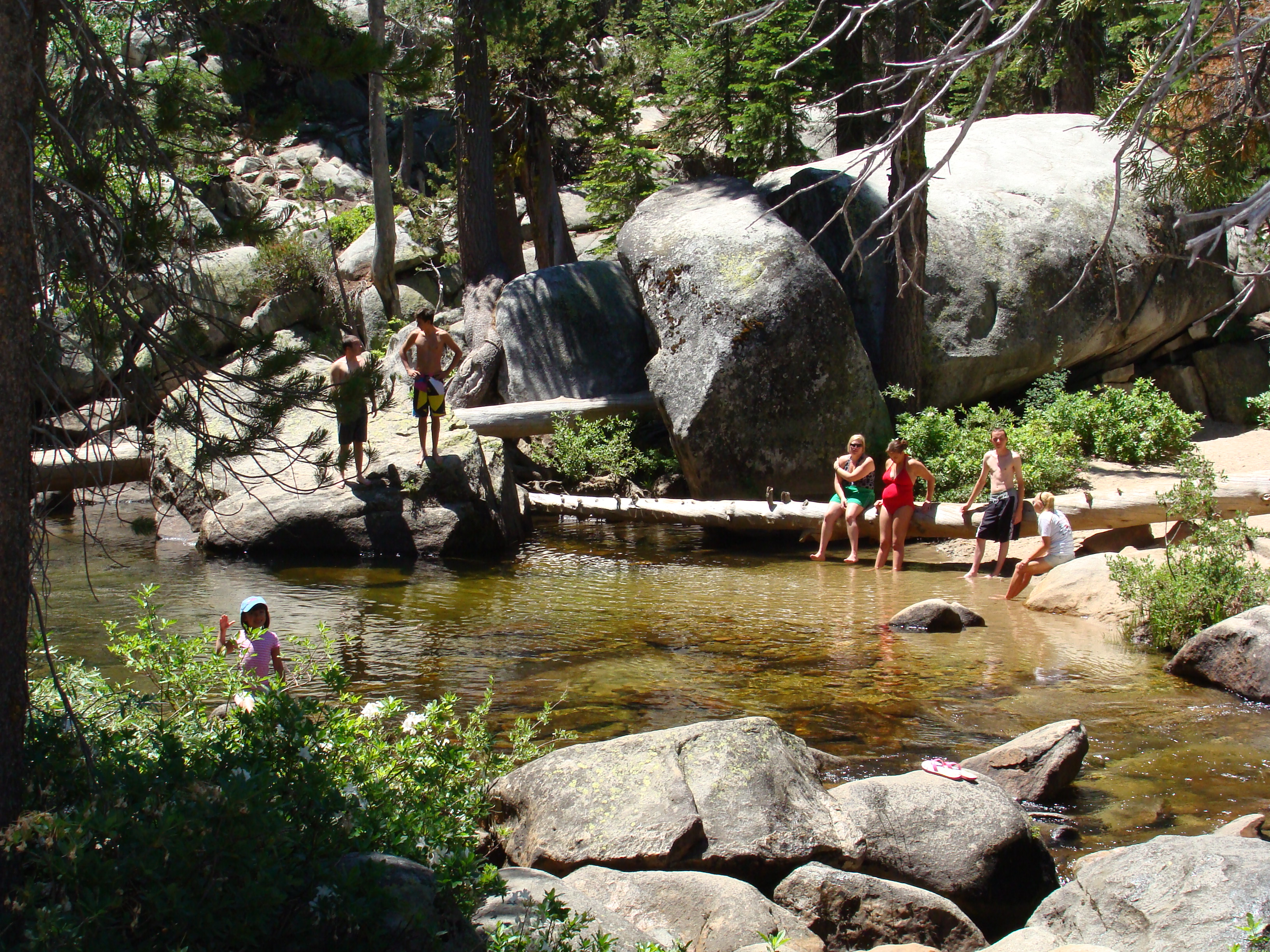
"Indian Pools" in Big Creek

Big Creek was built at the site of the first dam and power plant of Southern California Edison's Big Creek Hydroelectric Project, one of the most extensive in the world. Other than the private helipad owned by Southern California Edison, the only way in or out of the town is Big Creek Road, off of State Route 168. The dam has a walkway across it to the south bank, but access is limited to employees of SCE and those residents who have been given a key. Its major industries are electric power generation and tourism. There is camping and water recreation in the summer and snow skiing in the winter. Huntington Lake is to the northeast and Shaver Lake is to the south. China Peak is only about 15 kilometers (9.3 mi) away. Though Big Creek's only school is an elementary, it teaches kindergarten through 8th grade.

The penstock pipes for the original two units at Big Creek Power Houses One and Two, built 1912–13, were purchased from the Krupp Works in Germany because at that time that manufacturer produced steel pipes of the tensile strength needed to contain the very high water pressures in the pipes in the 1,500 foot (460 m) drop down to Power House One. All post-World War One penstock pipes were manufactured in the United States.

The first post office opened at Big Creek in 1912.

Half the town's homes were destroyed by the 2020 Creek Fire.

== Demographics ==
Historical population
Census	Pop.	Note	%±
2010	175		—
2020	151		−13.7%
U.S. Decennial Census; 2010

=== 2020 census ===
As of the 2020 census, Big Creek had a population of 151, with a population density of 328.3 inhabitants per square mile (126.8/km^{2}). The median age was 39.5 years. The age distribution was as follows: 46 people (30.5%) under the age of 18, 11 people (7.3%) aged 18 to 24, 34 people (22.5%) aged 25 to 44, 33 people (21.9%) aged 45 to 64, and 27 people (17.9%) who were 65 years of age or older. There were 73 males and 78 females. For every 100 females there were 93.6 males, and for every 100 females age 18 and over there were 94.4 males age 18 and over.

0.0% of residents lived in urban areas, while 100.0% lived in rural areas.

The whole population lived in households. There were 58 households in Big Creek, of which 32.8% had children under the age of 18 living in them. Of all households, 48.3% were married-couple households, 3.4% were cohabiting couple households, 29.3% were households with a male householder and no spouse or partner present, and 19.0% were households with a female householder and no spouse or partner present. About 41.4% of all households were made up of individuals and 20.7% had someone living alone who was 65 years of age or older. The average household size was 2.60. There were 34 families (58.6% of all households).

There were 123 housing units at an average density of 267.4 units per square mile (103.2 units/km^{2}), of which 52.8% were vacant. Of the occupied units, 26 (44.8%) were owner-occupied and 32 (55.2%) were renter-occupied. The homeowner vacancy rate was 0.0% and the rental vacancy rate was 3.0%.

Racial composition as of the 2020 census
Race	Number	Percent
White	117	77.5%
Black or African American	0	0.0%
American Indian and Alaska Native	5	3.3%
Asian	3	2.0%
Native Hawaiian and Other Pacific Islander	0	0.0%
Some other race	7	4.6%
Two or more races	19	12.6%
Hispanic or Latino (of any race)	12	7.9%

=== 2010 census ===
Big Creek first appeared as a census designated place in the 2010 U.S. census.

== Education ==
Big Creek is served by the Big Creek Elementary School District and by the Sierra Unified School District for grades 9-12 only.

== See also ==
- San Joaquin and Eastern Railroad
