= Redinger Dam =

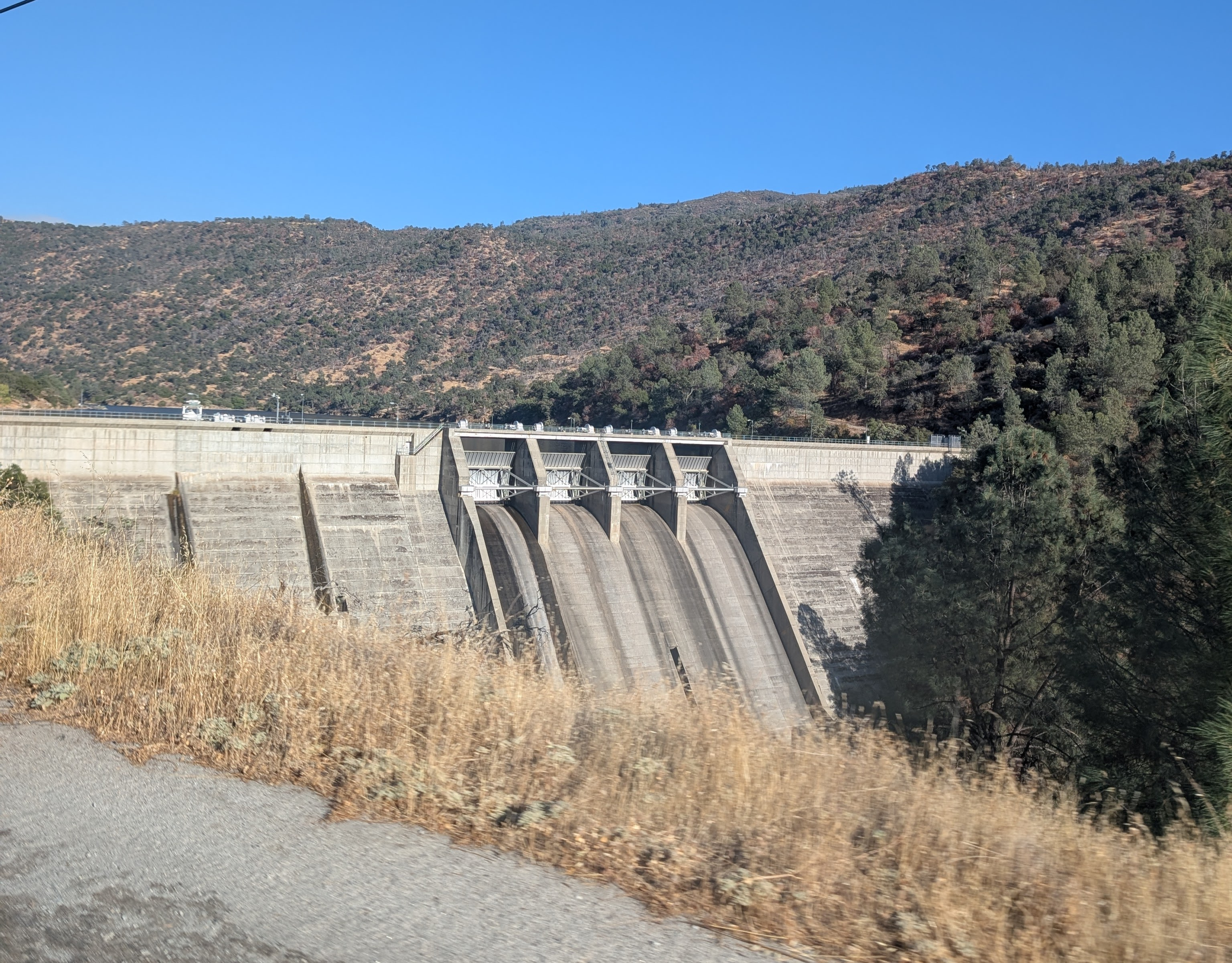
- Redinger Dam in 2025
- Interactive map of Redinger Dam
- Country: United States
- Location: Fresno County, California
- Coordinates: 37°08′42″N 119°27′05″W
- Status: Operational
- Opening date: 1951; 75 years ago
- Owner: Southern California Edison

Dam and spillways
- Height (foundation): 250 feet (76 m)
- Length: 875 feet (267 m)

Reservoir
- Total capacity: 35,000 acre⋅ft (43,000 dam^{3})
- Surface area: 465 acres (188 ha)

Redinger Dam (National ID # CA00440; also known as Big Creek Dam Number 7) is a dam in Fresno County, California.

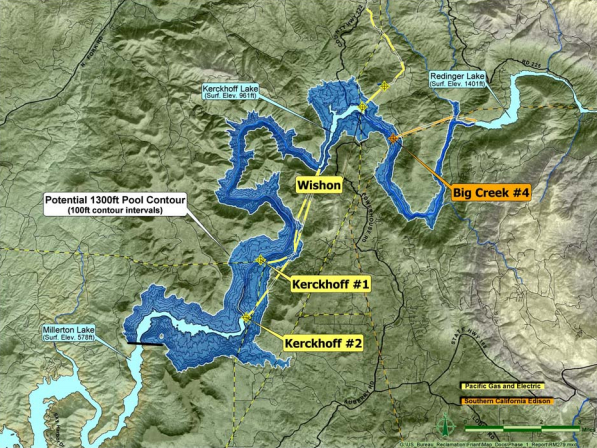
Redinger Lake and the upper San Joaquin basin, in the context of the proposed Temperance Flat Dam

The concrete gravity dam was completed in 1951 as one component of Southern California Edison's Big Creek Hydroelectric Project, a system of 25 dams, nine power plants and supporting tunnels and diversion channels in the upper basin of the San Joaquin River, one of the most extensive hydroelectric systems in the world.

Redinger Dam stands 250 feet (76 m) tall, with a length of 875 feet (267 m) at its crest.

The reservoir it creates, Redinger Lake, has a normal water surface of 465 acres (188 ha) and a maximum capacity of 35,000 acre-feet (43,000,000 m^{3}). Recreation includes fishing (for largemouth bass, bluegill, or hard heads), camping, and hiking. The dam and lake were named after David H. Redinger in a ceremony that occurred on October 24, 1955. Redinger served as superintendent of Edison's Big Creek Hydroelectric Project from its inception until his retirement in 1947.

== See also ==
- List of dams in California
- List of lakes in California
