= Big Creek Hydroelectric Project =

Hydroelectric power scheme on the upper San Joaquin River System, California

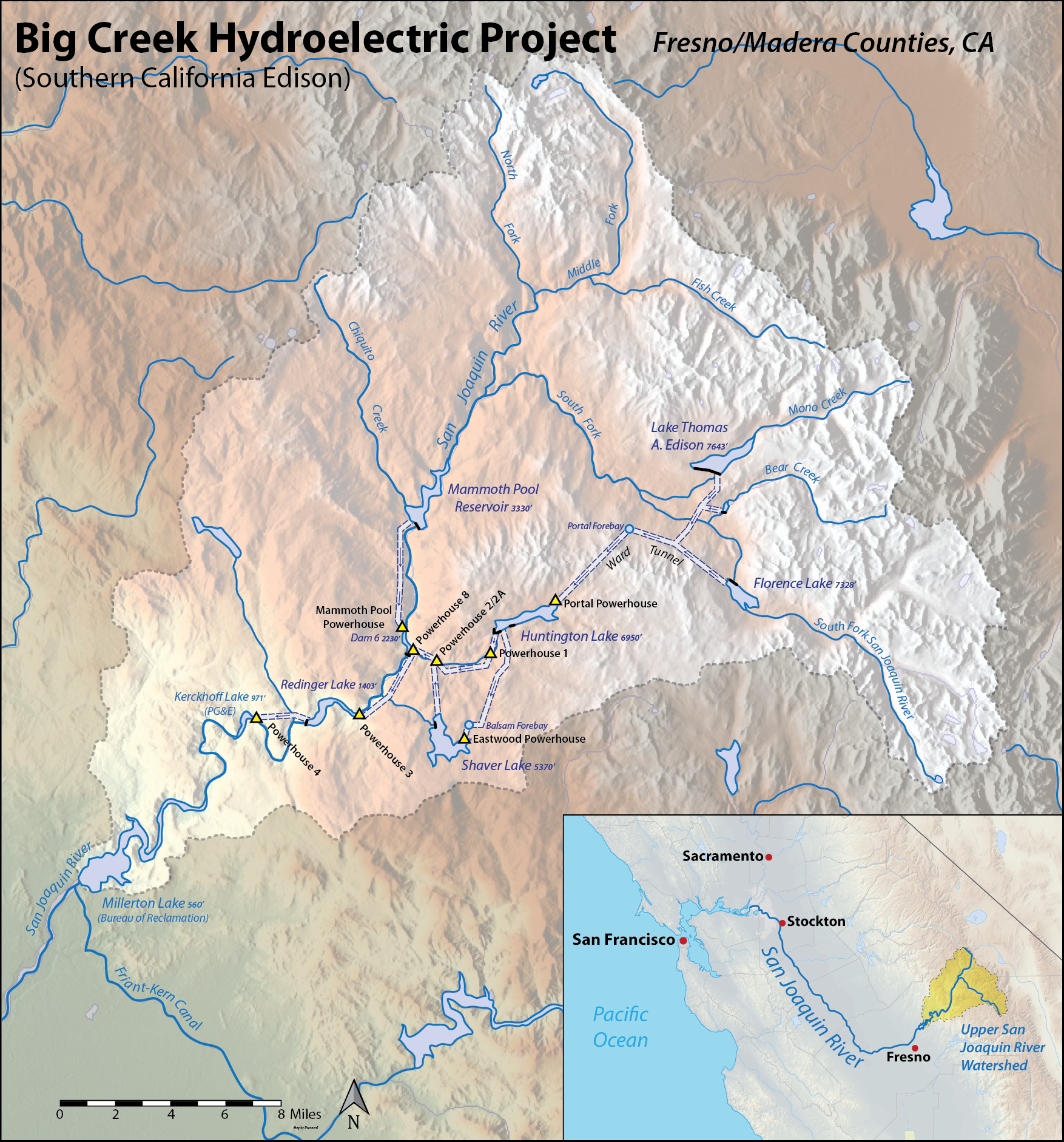
Map showing primary reservoirs and power plants of the Big Creek Project (many small diversion dams not shown)

The Big Creek Hydroelectric Project is an extensive hydroelectric power scheme on the upper San Joaquin River system, in the Sierra Nevada of central California. The project is owned and operated by Southern California Edison (SCE). The use and reuse of the waters of the San Joaquin River, its South Fork, and the namesake of the project, Big Creek – over a vertical drop of 6,200 ft (1,900 m) – have over the years inspired a nickname, "The Hardest Working Water in the World".

The primary purpose of the project was to provide electric power for the fast-growing city of Los Angeles. California engineer John S. Eastwood was the principal designer of the system, which was initially funded and built by Henry E. Huntington's Pacific Light and Power Company (PL&P). Construction of the system's facilities started in 1911, and the first power was transmitted to Los Angeles in 1913. After SCE acquired PL&P in 1917, the system was gradually expanded to its present size, with the last powerhouse coming on line in 1987. Today, these facilities include 27 dams, miles of tunnels, and 24 generating units in nine powerhouses with a total installed capacity of more than 1,000 megawatts (MW). Its six major reservoirs have a combined storage capacity of more than 560,000 acre-feet (690,000 dam^{3}). The project's facilities were listed on the National Register of Historic Places in 2016.

Today, the Big Creek project generates nearly 4 billion kilowatt hours (KWh) per year – about 90 percent of SCE's total hydroelectric power, or about 20 percent of SCE's total generating capacity. Big Creek accounts for 12 percent of all the hydroelectric power produced in California. The Big Creek reservoirs also provide irrigation and flood control benefits for the Central Valley, and are popular recreation areas. However, the project has had various environmental and social impacts, including the disruption of fish and animal migration, and the flooding of historical sites and traditional Native American lands.

== Background ==
The Big Creek Project was the vision of California engineer John S. Eastwood, who first surveyed the upper San Joaquin River system in the late 1880s and mapped potential sites for reservoirs and hydroelectric plants. In 1895, Eastwood became chief engineer at the San Joaquin Electric Company which made an effort to develop a hydroelectric project on the North Fork of the San Joaquin River. However, they lacked the capital to build a storage dam and when a drought hit, the North Fork dried up, leading to the financial failure of that project.

Eastwood was undaunted by the failure and founded his own Mammoth Power Company which intended to generate power by creating a rockfill dam on the main stem of the San Joaquin. However, investors balked at the massive potential costs of this project (the tunnel required to carry water to the power station would be 20 miles (32 km) long) and by 1901 Eastwood ceased to promote this plan. Following this, Eastwood began to draw up much grander plans for a hydroelectric system encompassing the entire upper San Joaquin River basin. Instead of a single large power plant – which would require an extensive tunnel and a big dam – he decided to split the system into a series of smaller reservoirs, where power would be generated in a stairstep fashion. This time, he finally found an investor willing to fund the audacious project.

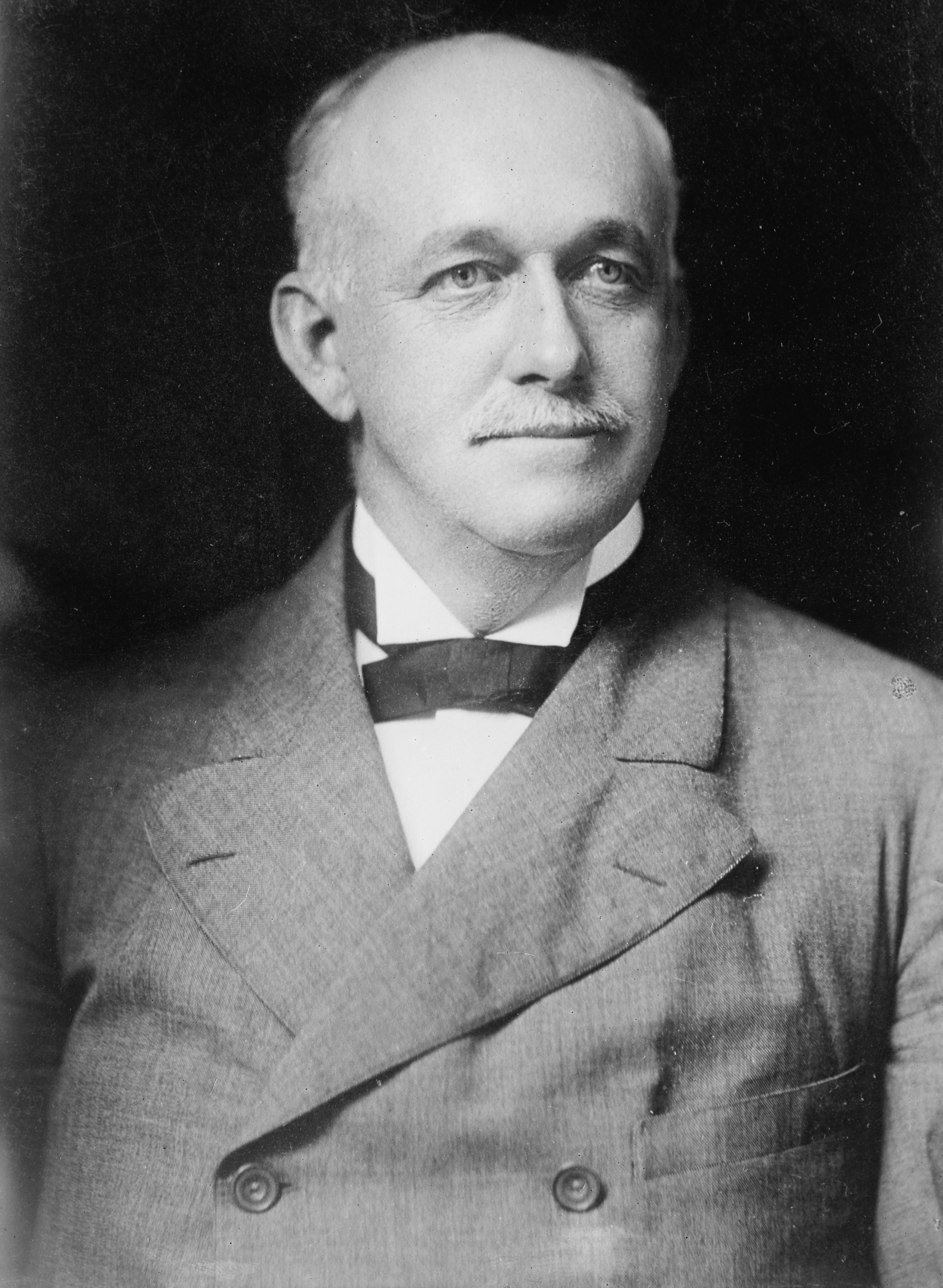
Henry E. Huntington, wealthy financier from Southern California who was largely responsible for the project's construction.

In 1902 Eastwood took his plans to William G. Kerckhoff, a Southern California businessman who was affiliated with Henry Huntington, a wealthy developer and power magnate from Los Angeles. Huntington was the founder of the Pacific Light and Power Company (PL&P), which was struggling to boost its generating capacity due to fast growth in Los Angeles and its suburbs, especially due to the new interurban electric light rail system that consumed some 80% of the region's power by the early 1900s. Hydroelectricity was seen as an attractively cheap alternative to thermal power stations, and the San Joaquin River was the only river close and large enough to Los Angeles to generate the kind of power Huntington envisioned. Although Huntington was initially skeptical of the feasibility of the project, he was impressed by Eastwood's studies and hired him to PL&P granting him 5,400 shares in return for making a thorough survey and a final plan for the hydroelectric system. Eastwood conducted these surveys between 1902 and 1905.

PL&P immediately began filing claims for San Joaquin water rights. However, construction was postponed for many years because the company's directors thought that the project would generate far more power than was needed at the time and emphasized development of more thermal plants. By 1905, Eastwood had developed his initial proposal for the system, consisting of a large reservoir and two powerhouses along Big Creek, a major tributary of the San Joaquin. During this time Eastwood pioneered the design of the multiple-arch dam; he would later become renowned for the building of this type of dam across the West.

By 1907, PL&P was almost ready to begin construction, but was further set back by the Panic of 1907. Then in 1910, Huntington, for reasons still not clearly known, fired Eastwood as chief engineer. This may have been because of conflicts over their respective shares of control or profit from the project. Also, the company's investors were doubtful of the safety of Eastwood's multiple-arch dam proposal and wanted to change to primarily gravity dams. However, "they may simply have viewed him as a mere technician who had performed his function at Big Creek and was no longer needed." Then in 1912 Eastwood was removed from PL&P altogether when Huntington assessed all shares valued at $5 in order to finance the project. Eastwood was unable to pay his resulting $27,000 assessment and was forced to give up his stake. Nevertheless, PL&P retained his original plans for the project.

== Construction ==
=== Financing and groundwork ===
PL&P began construction on the Big Creek Project in February 1910. Huntington placed George Ward in charge of the project and hired the Boston engineering firm Stone & Webster to oversee construction. PL&P issued an initial $10 million bond measure to finance the project. However, by October 1911 only $2.5 million of bonds had been sold. The company was forced to compromise and sold the remaining bonds at 85 percent value to a syndicate formed by investment bankers William Salomon & Co.

Huntington had to convince farmers in the San Joaquin Valley – including Miller & Lux, run by land barons Henry Miller and Charles Lux, who owned nearly a 1,000,000 acres (400,000 ha) in the valley – that the dams would increase rather than decrease the amount of water available for their use. In August 1906, PL&P brokered an agreement with Miller & Lux, which allowed them to build storage reservoirs in the San Joaquin River system "in return for a guaranteed, regular streamflow through Miller & Lux's lands".

Transportation of workers and materials to the construction site posed the first major challenge. The only available method of transport was by mule team, but this would prove slow and expensive, so the decision was made to build a railway instead. The rail line, known as the San Joaquin and Eastern Railroad, would split off from the Southern Pacific main line at El Prado (about 20 miles (32 km) northeast of Fresno) and carve its way 56 miles (90 km) deep into the Sierra Nevada, to the company town of Big Creek.

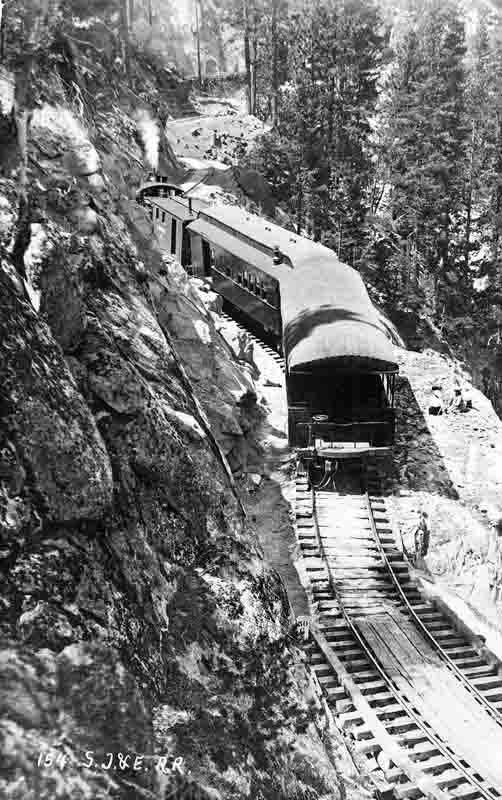
The San Joaquin & Eastern Railroad at Huntington Lake, c. 1918

Construction of the railroad began on February 5, 1912. Winding its way up the San Joaquin River Canyon, the railroad – featuring 1,078 curves, 43 bridges and 255 grades of up to 5.2 percent – was nicknamed the "Slow, Jerky and Expensive". The final mile (1.6 km) was known as the "Miracle Mile" because it reportedly cost over $1 million to construct. The railroad was completed by July 1912, in a record 157 days. Due to its steep grades and sharp curves (up to 60 degrees) it was serviced by geared Shay locomotives, built by the Ohio Lima Locomotive Works.

=== First phase, 1913–1914 ===
Work on the dams and powerhouses themselves started in the summer of 1912, with the construction of three concrete dams – Big Creek Nos. 1, 2 and 3 – which would hold back a large reservoir, Huntington Lake. Situated at nearly 7,000 feet (2,100 m) above sea level, Huntington would store water from Big Creek to power two hydroelectric plants in the canyon thousands of feet below. These plants, Big Creek Powerhouse No. 1 and No. 2, would be located on two small forebay dams known as Dam 4 and Dam 5. By late summer, the workforce had grown to about 3,500 men spread across twelve camps in the High Sierra. Work proceeded at a rapid pace because of the tight budget: the project had to start producing electricity so as to pay for itself before the company's funds ran out. The budget was further strained because the gravity dams required much more concrete to build than the originally proposed multiple-arch design.

On January 7, 1913, a strike began as workers protested the harsh working conditions and an insufficient food supply. PL&P responded by firing nearly 2,000 strikers and hiring an entire new workforce; however, this caused significant delays in construction. Powerhouse No. 1 did not come online until October 14, 1913. Powerhouse No. 2, located further downstream, would have been completed three days later but for a fire that heavily damaged the building, delaying completion until December 8. Although the details are uncertain, this is believed to have been a case of arson.

In November 1913, PL&P's Redondo generating plant in Los Angeles suffered a failure, and on November 8 the company made the decision to switch to Big Creek power for the first time. The transmission of 240 miles (390 km) was one of the longest in the world at the time. The difficulty of the engineering work on Big Creek was compared to that of the Panama Canal, which was also under construction at the time.

As World War I began, construction temporarily ceased on the project, with little activity between 1914 and 1919. However, work did begin on a tunnel to the future Big Creek Powerhouse No. 3, though only a fraction of the tunnel was excavated. PL&P merged into Southern California Edison (SCE) in 1917 as Huntington worked to consolidate energy interests in Southern California.

=== Second phase, 1921–1929 ===
Interest in expanding the project resumed with the economic boom after the war. In 1919, the dams at Huntington Lake were raised and a fourth constructed to increase the lake's capacity. Further proposals for project expansion were ready by October 1920 and approved on January 20, 1921. The proposed expansions would involve increasing the capacity of the powerhouses by diverting water from other streams in the upper San Joaquin River system. The first new component to be constructed was Big Creek Powerhouse No. 8, which took advantage of the final elevation drop between Powerhouse No. 2 and Big Creek's confluence with the San Joaquin River.

In 1923, Dam 6 was completed, located on the San Joaquin River just below its confluence with Big Creek. The dam forms a small reservoir that serves as the afterbay for Powerhouse 8. Construction of this concrete arch dam was exceedingly difficult due to the narrowness of the canyon and the large flow of the San Joaquin River. During foundation pouring, the entire flow of the river had to be carried in a flume suspended along the precipitous side of the canyon.

1923 also saw the completion of Powerhouse No. 3 – the next step below Powerhouse 8, using the combined flows of Big Creek and the San Joaquin River – came online, and was billed as the "electrical giant of the West" – it was the largest hydroelectric plant in the West, capable of generating 75 megawatts, a huge amount at the time. Also completed in 1923 was the conversion of Big Creek's power transmission system from 150kV to 220kV – the highest commercial voltage in the world at the time. By 1925, Powerhouses Nos. 1 and 2 were expanded in preparation for an influx of diverted water from the South Fork San Joaquin River, a stream much larger than Big Creek that descends from the main crest of the Sierra several miles to the east of Huntington Lake.

The South Fork diversion delivered its first water on April 13, 1925, through the 13-mile (21 km) Ward Tunnel, which diverted water from the river near Jackass Meadows and into Huntington Lake. Work on a dam at Jackass Meadows began in 1925 to ensure a year-round water supply for the diversion. The Florence Lake Dam was completed in 1926, forming Florence Lake; the dam was built using Eastwood's multiple-arch design. In 1927, the Mono-Bear diversions were completed, drawing water from two eastern tributaries of the South Fork, Mono Creek and Bear Creek. A huge siphon was built in order to carry the water across the 700-foot (210 m) deep valley of the South Fork to join with the Ward Tunnel.

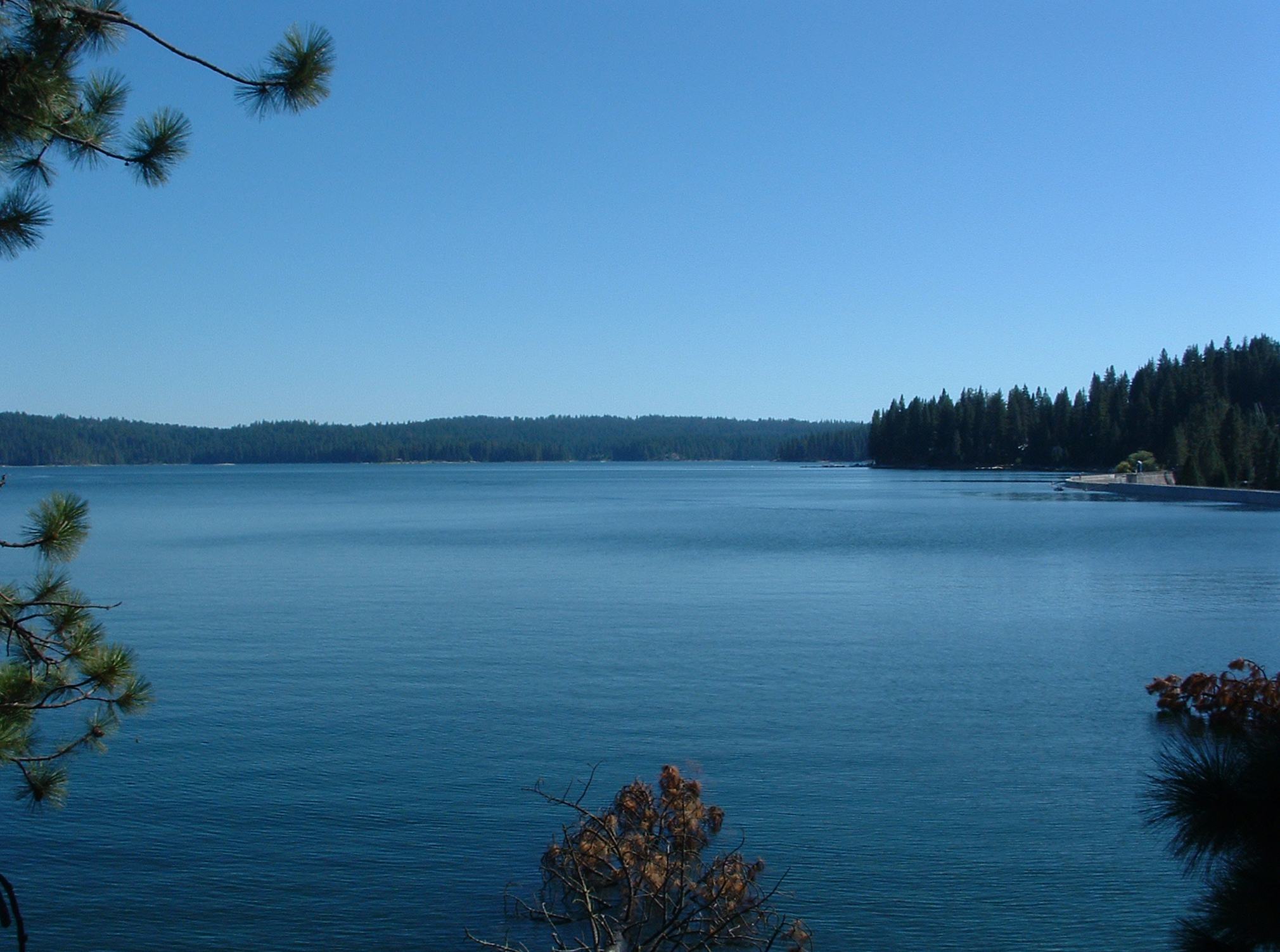
Shaver Lake, completed in 1927, stores excess runoff from Huntington Lake to increase power generation.

Although the diversions greatly increased the amount of water available for hydroelectric generation, the existing reservoirs were limited in their capacity to store that water. The combined 154,400-acre-foot (190,400 dam^{3}) capacity of Huntington and Florence Lakes was much smaller than the annual 1,700,000-acre-foot (2,100,000 dam^{3}) runoff of the upper San Joaquin River system. As a result, a dam was built on Stevenson Creek between 1925 and 1927, forming Shaver Lake, to store excess water from Huntington. The lake replaced an earlier reservoir built in the valley by the Fresno Flume and Lumber Company to store water for a timber operation. Huntington Lake was then connected to Shaver by a tunnel. Although the elevation differential between the lakes was great – more than 1,000 feet (300 m) – no power station was installed here at the time.

In 1926 work began on Big Creek Powerhouse No. 2A, which would generate power from water released from Shaver Lake. The powerhouse was so named because it was actually an extension of the Powerhouse No. 2 building, and it would discharge into the same forebay reservoir (Dam 5) on Big Creek. Powerhouse 2A was the last major component to be constructed during Phase 2, with the exception of an expansion to Powerhouse 8 in 1929. Most of the construction camps had been taken down by the end of 1926.

More than 5,000 people worked on the project during the peak of Phase 2 construction. Safety regulations during the construction of the second phase were much stricter than during Phase 1, in no small part due to a deadly accident in 1924, when a worker was killed after being sucked into a turbine by an unintended release of water. SCE also invested in improving civic and educational facilities in its company towns. Nonetheless, continued difficult conditions led to a 40 percent monthly turnover rate in the workforce.

The second phase expansions increased the generating capacity by six times – from 70 to 425 megawatts. Annual generation rose from 213 GWh in 1914 to 1,600 GWh in 1928, a nearly eightfold increase. By this time, Big Creek provided 70–90 percent of the power used in the Los Angeles area, a distinction it would hold well into the 1940s.

With the onset of the Great Depression in the 1930s, construction once again stopped. In 1933, most of the Big Creek railroad – which had carried 400,000 tons of goods during its 21 years of operation – was dismantled and sold for scrap. The original railbed was then used as a road.

=== Third phase, 1948–1960 ===
After the end of World War II, construction resumed in earnest in 1948, starting with an expansion of Powerhouse No. 3. In July 1949, construction began on Redinger Dam, located at the outlet of Powerhouse 3, and the Big Creek Powerhouse No. 4. By 1951, these facilities were completed, forming the lowermost and farthest-downstream unit of the Big Creek project. Powerhouse 4 came online between June and July of that year.

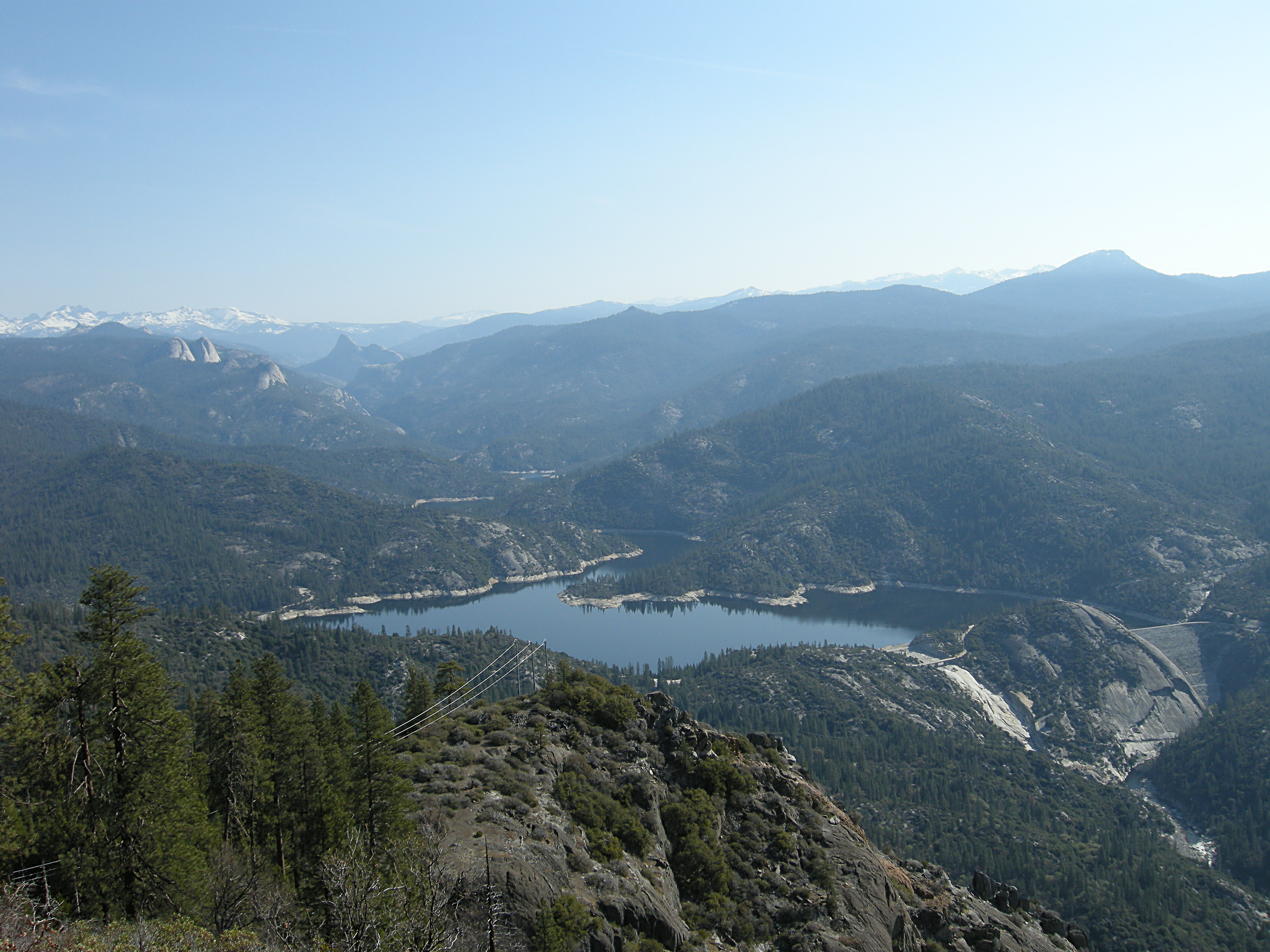
Mammoth Pool Dam (far right), completed in 1959, is – at 411 ft (125 m) high – the tallest dam of the Big Creek Project.

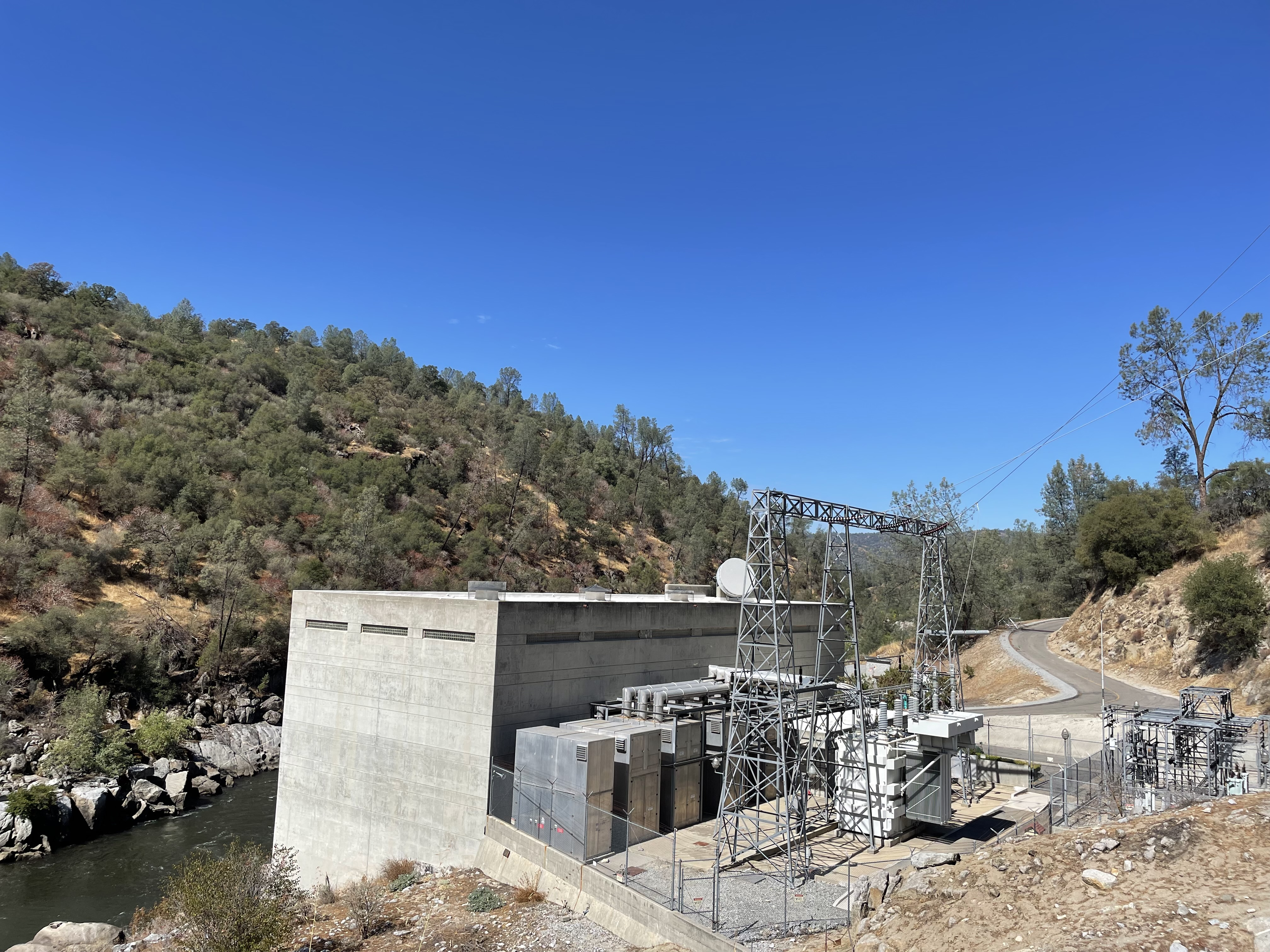
Powerhouse No. 4 in 2022

In the 1950s, SCE added further generating capacity by building the project's two largest dams, starting with Vermilion Valley Dam on Mono Creek in 1953. By October 1954, this enormous 4,234-foot (1,291 m) long earthen dam, made of 5.3 million cubic yards (4.05 million m^{3}) of material, was completed. The dam was dedicated on the 75th anniversary of Thomas Edison's invention of the electric lightbulb, so the reservoir was named Lake Thomas A. Edison in his honor. Although the dam itself has no power generating capacity, its primary purpose is to store floodwaters from Mono Creek for later release into the Mono-Bear Diversion and Ward Tunnel, increasing power generation at downstream plants during the dry season.

With the development of new low-head turbines, a small powerhouse at the outlet of Ward Tunnel was planned in 1954. The Portal Powerhouse, built from 1954 to 1955, is located just above Huntington Lake. The powerhouse is unique because it is actually not contained in a building, and is controlled automatically unlike the other powerhouses at Big Creek.

In early 1958, work began on Mammoth Pool Dam, located on the main San Joaquin River above the confluence of Big Creek. By October 17, 1959, this 411-foot (125 m) high rockfill dam – the tallest dam of the project, also containing nearly as much material as Vermilion Dam – was completed, and on March 28, 1960, the Mammoth Pool Powerhouse, located at Dam 6 near Powerhouse 8, came online.

The third phase ended with the completion of Mammoth Pool, and by this time the Big Creek Project was almost fundamentally complete.

=== Fourth phase, 1983–1987 ===
The biggest powerhouse at Big Creek was not actually built until the mid-1980s with the implementation of the Balsam Meadows Project. The Eastwood Powerhouse, with a capacity of nearly 200 MW, was built at the outlet of the diversion tunnel from Huntington to Shaver Lake. This powerhouse differs from the others at Big Creek because it is a pumped-storage operation. During times of low demand, the station draws water from Shaver Lake up to a small reservoir, the Balsam Meadows Forebay, located on the top of a nearby mountain. In addition, the power station is actually located in an artificial cavern 1,100 feet (340 m) deep, carved out of solid granite.

Completed in 1987, the Balsam Meadows project greatly increased the capability of Big Creek to generate peaking power, and finally brought generation capacity and production to its present level.

== Project data and statistics ==
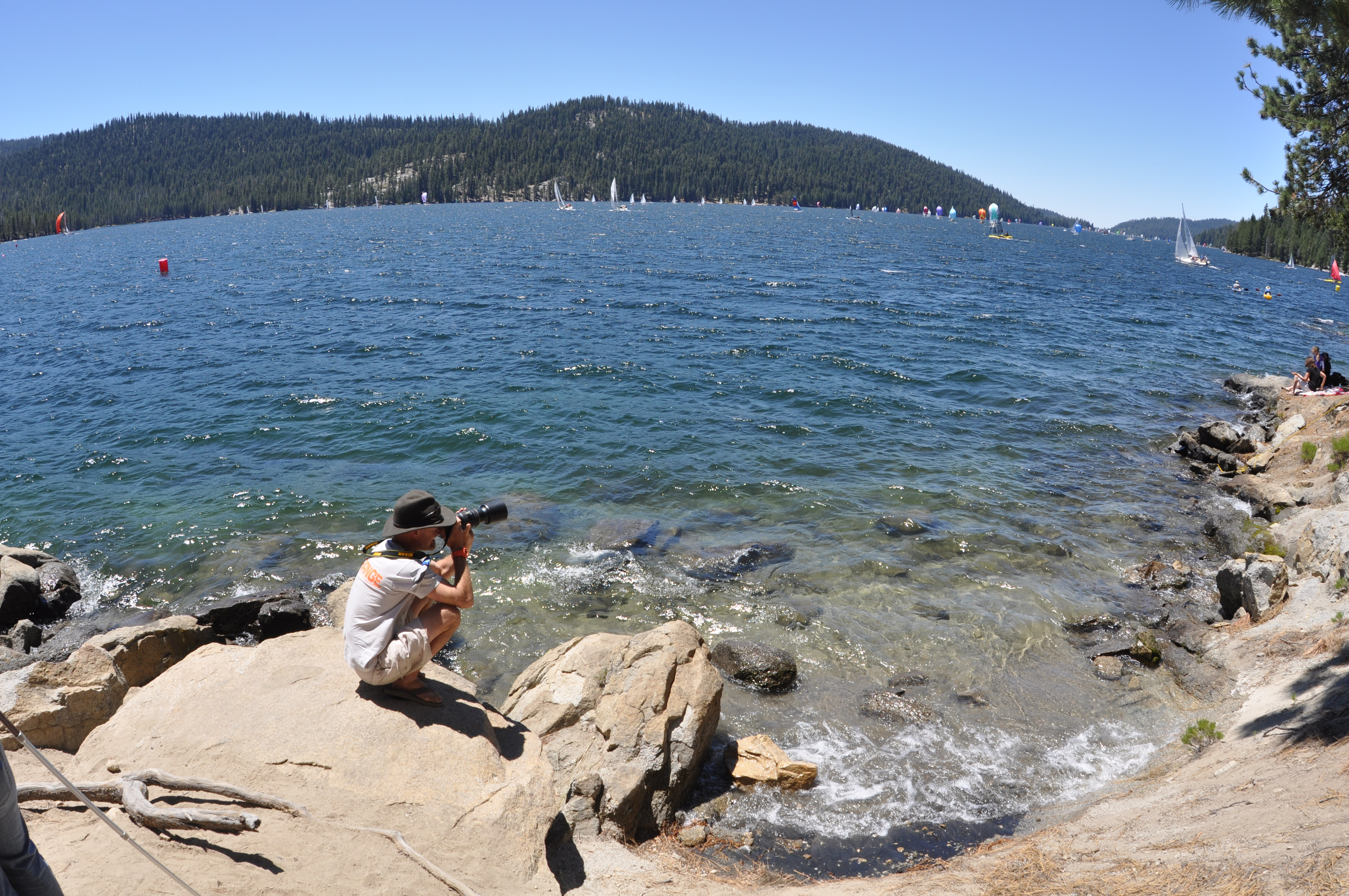
Huntington Lake was the first Big Creek Project reservoir to be completed.

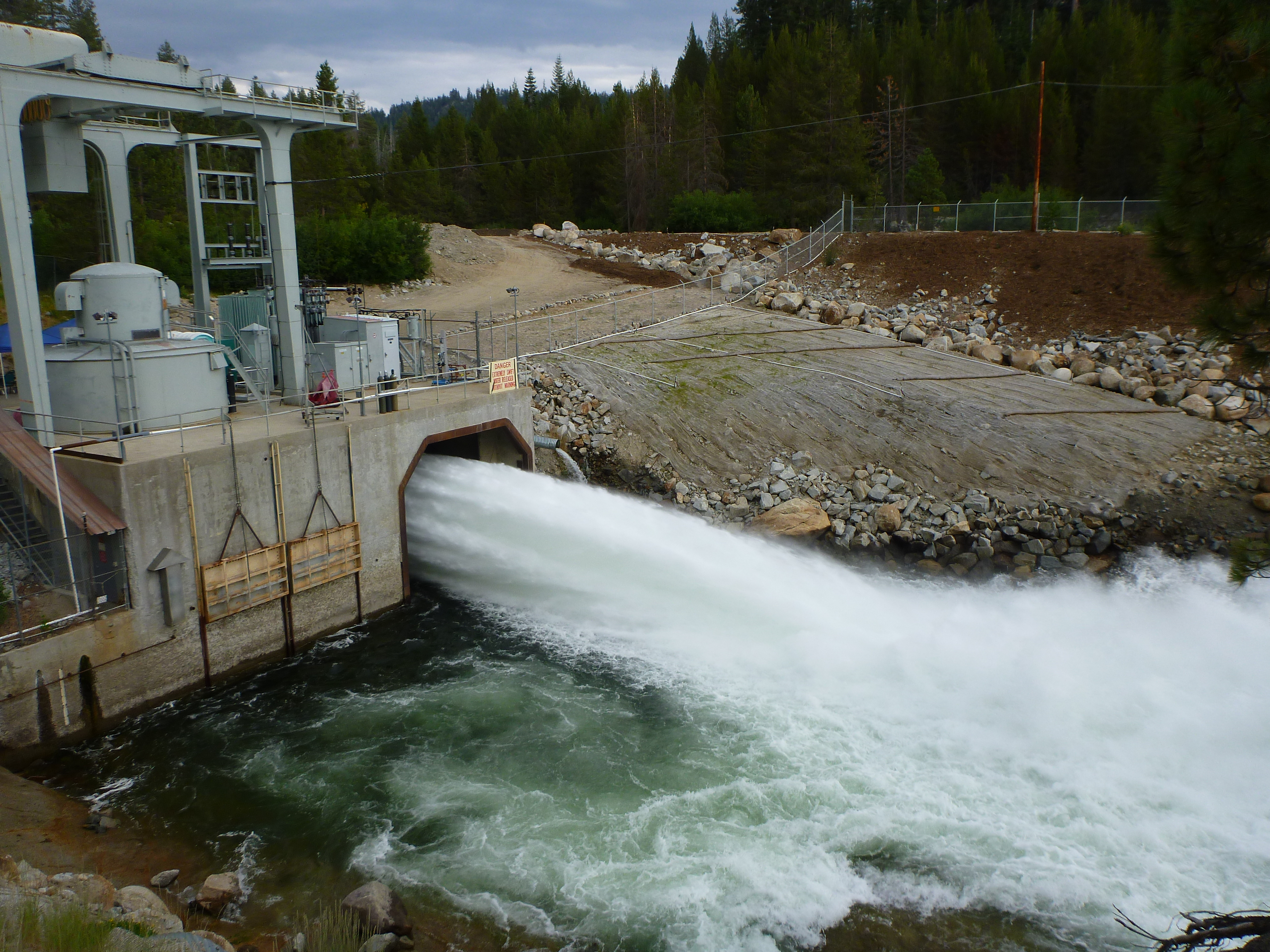
Portal Powerhouse at Huntington Lake

Big Creek consists of multiple closely interconnected projects, operating under seven Federal Energy Regulatory Commission licenses. The operations of the project are outlined below:

- The dam at Florence Lake captures runoff from the South Fork San Joaquin River, diverting it through the Ward Tunnel towards Big Creek. The tunnel's flow is augmented by diversions that capture water from two major tributaries, Mono and Bear Creeks. The Vermilion Valley Dam, forming Lake Thomas A. Edison on Mono Creek, provides further regulation of the water supply. The Ward Tunnel eventually drops into Huntington Lake, where it feeds the Portal Powerhouse.
- Huntington Lake is formed by Big Creek Dam Nos. 1, 2 and 3 and a smaller saddle dam at the headwaters of Big Creek. The lake stores water from Big Creek and the South Fork San Joaquin River for release through a tunnel, plunging 2,131 feet (650 m) to Big Creek Powerhouse No. 1 on a small forebay called Dam 4. From here the water is diverted through another tunnel, dropping 1,858 feet (566 m) to Big Creek Powerhouse No. 2 on Dam 5.
- Shaver Lake is located on Stevenson Creek south of Huntington Lake. Although the lake receives some water from its local basin, its primary purpose is to serve as a storage facility for overflow water from Huntington. Water from Huntington is diverted through a tunnel to a small reservoir, Balsam Meadows Forebay, and drops 1,338 feet (408 m) to the Eastwood Powerhouse on Shaver Lake. During off-peak hours, water is pumped from Shaver Lake back up to Balsam Meadows to improve peaking power capacity. From Shaver, the water falls 2,418 feet (737 m) – the highest hydraulic head of the project – to Big Creek Powerhouse 2A, also located on Dam 5.
- From Dam 5 the combined waters flow through another tunnel and drop 713 feet (217 m) to Big Creek Powerhouse No. 8, located on Dam 6 at the confluence of Big Creek and the San Joaquin River.
- The Mammoth Pool Dam forms Mammoth Pool Reservoir on the San Joaquin River about 7 miles (11 km) upstream from Dam 6. Mammoth Pool regulates the flow of the San Joaquin River to allow increased power generation downstream. Water flows from Mammoth Pool through a tunnel to Dam 6, where it drops 1,100 feet (340 m), feeding the Mammoth Pool Powerhouse.
- From Dam 6 the combined waters of Big Creek and the San Joaquin fall 827 feet (252 m) to Big Creek Powerhouse No. 3 at Redinger Dam, also known as Dam 7. From Redinger the water flows through a final tunnel and drops 418 feet (127 m) to Big Creek Powerhouse No. 4, located on the reservoir of Kerckhoff Dam (part of the separate Kerckhoff hydroelectric project owned by Pacific Gas and Electric).

=== Reservoirs and forebays ===
Statistics of the major reservoirs
Dam(s)	Reservoir	River	Dam height	Storage capacity	Surface area	Elevation	Year
Big Creek Dam No. 1 Big Creek Dam No. 2 Big Creek Dam No. 3	Huntington Lake	Big Creek	170 ft (52 m)	89,800 acre.ft (110,000 dam^{3})	1,440 acres (583 ha)	6,950 ft (2,118 m)	1913
Big Creek Dam No. 4	Dam Four Lake	Big Creek	75 ft (23 m)	99 acre.ft (122 dam^{3})	4 acres (2 ha)	4,810 ft (1,466 m)	1913
Big Creek Dam No. 5	Dam Five Lake	Big Creek	60 ft (18 m)	74 acre.ft (91 dam^{3})	10 acres (4 ha)	2,943 ft (897 m)	1921
Big Creek Dam No. 6	Dam Six Lake	San Joaquin River	155 ft (47 m)	1,730 acre.ft (2,134 dam^{3})	23 acres (28 ha)	2,230 ft (680 m)	1923
Florence Lake Dam	Florence Lake	South Fork; San Joaquin River	154 ft (47 m)	64,600 acre.ft (80,000 dam^{3})	296 acres (120 ha)	7,328 ft (2,234 m)	1926
Mammoth Pool Dam	Mammoth Pool Reservoir	San Joaquin River	411 ft (125 m)	123,000 acre.ft (152,000 dam^{3})	1,100 acres (445 ha)	3,330 ft (1,015 m)	1959
Redinger Dam (Big Creek Dam No. 7)	Redinger Lake	San Joaquin River	250 ft (76 m)	35,000 acre.ft (43,200 dam^{3})	620 acres (251 ha)	1,403 ft (428 m)	1951
Shaver Lake Dam	Shaver Lake	Stevenson Creek	185 ft (56 m)	136,000 acre.ft (168,000 dam^{3})	2,190 acres (886 ha)	5,370 ft (1,637 m)	1927
Vermilion Valley Dam	Lake Thomas A. Edison	Mono Creek	165 ft (50 m)	140,000 acre.ft (173,000 dam^{3})	1,910 acres (773 ha)	7,643 ft (2,330 m)	1954
Water Data Totals	(all lakes full)			590,303 acre.ft (727,444 dam^{3})	7,593 acres (3071 ha)		

=== Diversion dams ===
Diversion dam statistics
Name	Serves (Note: Project facility that this diversion provides water to)	Elevation
Adit No. 8 Creek	Powerhouse No. 2	4,816 ft (1,468 m)
Balsam Creek	Powerhouse No. 2	4,881 ft (1,488 m)
Bear Creek	Mono–Bear Diversion	7,350 ft (2,240 m)
Bolsillo Creek	Ward Tunnel	7,535 ft (2,297 m)
Camp 62 Creek	Ward Tunnel	7,257 ft (2,212 m)
Chinquapin Creek	Ward Tunnel	7,273 ft (2,217 m)
Crater Creek	Florence Lake	8,762 ft (2,671 m)
Ely Creek	Powerhouse No. 2	4,845 ft (1,477 m)
Hooper Creek	Florence Lake	7,350 ft (2,240 m)
Mono Creek	Mono–Bear Diversion	7,355 ft (2,242 m)
North Slide Creek	Florence Lake	7,350 ft (2,240 m)
Pitman Creek	Eastwood Powerhouse	6,998 ft (2,133 m)
Rock Creek	Mammoth Pool Powerhouse	3,336 ft (1,017 m)
Ross Creek	Mammoth Pool Powerhouse	3,359 ft (1,024 m)
South Slide Creek	Florence Lake	7,345 ft (2,239 m)
Tombstone Creek	Florence Lake	7,365 ft (2,245 m)
Warm Creek	Lake Thomas A. Edison	8,004 ft (2,440 m)

=== Power plants ===
Powerplant statistics
Name	Capacity (MW)	Hydraulic head	Annual generation (MWh)
Big Creek 1	88.15	2,131 ft (649 m)	412,542
Big Creek 2	66.5	1,858 ft (566 m)	352,941
Big Creek 2A	110.0	2,418 ft (737 m)	511,290
Big Creek 3	174.45	827 ft (252 m)	830,202
Big Creek 4	100.0	418 ft (127 m)	474,160
Big Creek 8	75.0	713 ft (217 m)	305,664
Mammoth Pool	190.0	1,100 ft (335 m)	642,035
Eastwood	199.8	1,338 ft (408 m)	356,342
Portal	10.8	230 ft (70 m)	47,400
Totals	1,014.7		3,932,576

== See also ==
- Central Valley Project
- Water in California

== Works cited ==
- Friedricks, William B. (1992). Henry E. Huntington and the Creation of Southern California. Ohio State University Press. ISBN 0-81420-553-4.
- Jackson, Donald Conrad (2005). Building the Ultimate Dam: John S. Eastwood and the Control of Water in the West. University of Oklahoma Press. ISBN 0-80613-733-9.
- Rehart, Catherine Morison (2002). The Valley's Legends & Legacies IV. Quill Driver Books. ISBN 1-88499-521-7.
