= Shaver Lake =

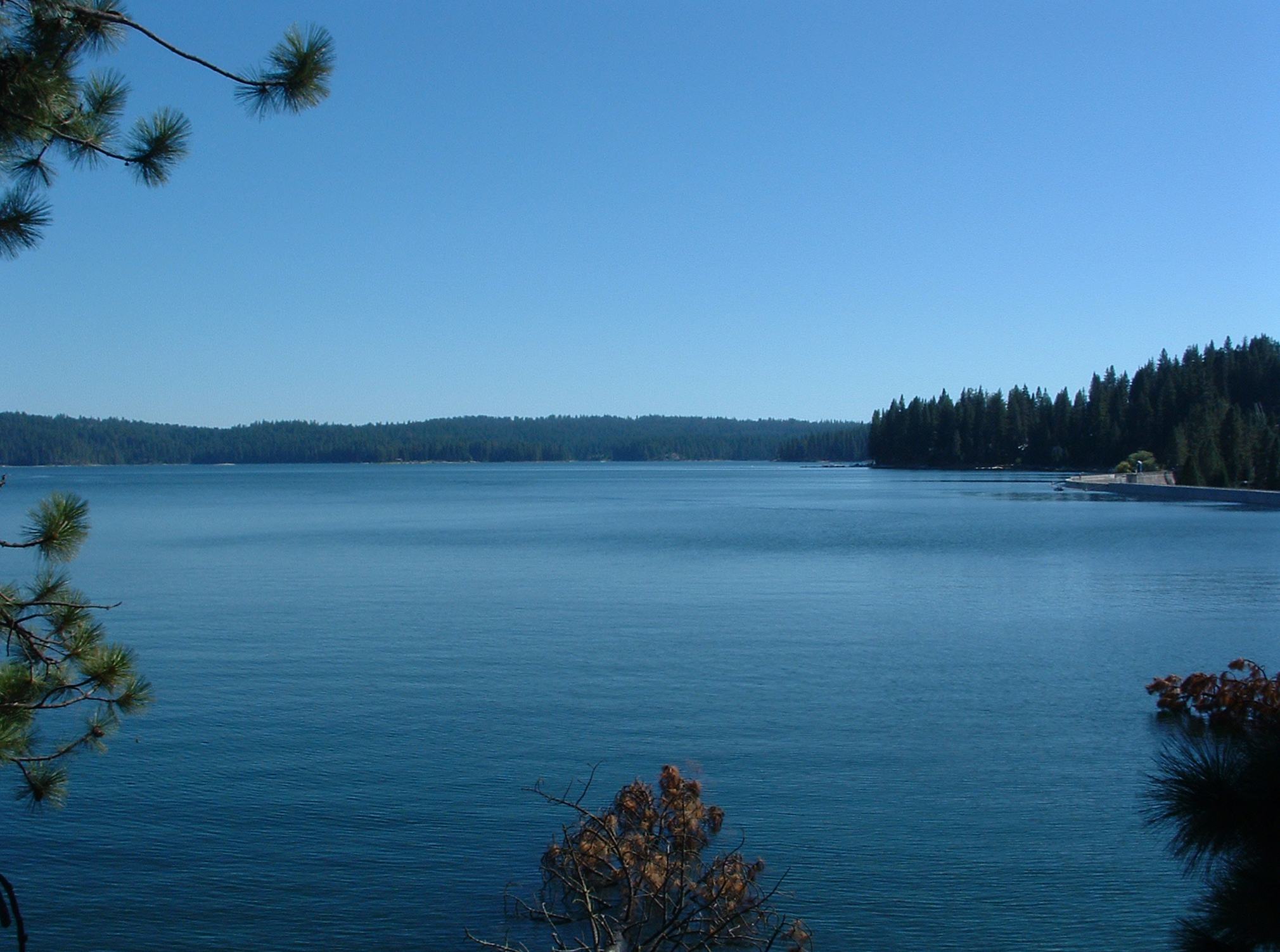

- Location within California Location within the United States
- Location: Sierra National Forest; Fresno County, California
- Coordinates: 37.12597°N 119.29075°W
- Type: Reservoir
- Primary inflows: Stevenson Creek
- Primary outflows: Stevenson Creek; Big Creek
- Catchment area: 29.3 sq mi (76 km^{2})
- Basin countries: United States
- Managing agency: Southern California Edison
- Surface area: 2,177 acres (881 ha)
- Average depth: 19.9 m (65 ft)
- Max. depth: 54.9 m (180 ft)
- Water volume: 135,283 acre⋅ft (166,869 dam^{3})
- Surface elevation: 5,500 ft (1,700 m)
- Settlements: Shaver Lake; Shaver Lake Heights
- References: U.S. Geological Survey Geographic Names Information System: Shaver Lake

Shaver Lake is an artificial lake on Stevenson Creek, in the Sierra National Forest of Fresno County, California. At an elevation of 5,500 ft (1,700 m), several smaller streams also flow into the lake, and it receives water from the tunnels of Southern California Edison's Big Creek Hydroelectric Project. The town of Shaver Lake is located on its southwest shore.

== Background ==
In 1917, Southern California Edison purchased the lake which had been owned by the Fresno Flume and Lumber Company for transporting lumber down to the San Joaquin Valley. The lake was formed with the construction of Shaver Lake Dam, which was built by Southern California Edison and completed in 1927 (99 years ago). The 180-foot (55 m) dam was built in 50-foot (15 m) blocks, with a keyway to hold it in place and a 30-inch (76 cm) copper sheet to make it watertight. Its capacity is 135,283 acre⋅ft (166,869 dam^{3}). Some water from the lake is discharged into Stevenson Creek for fish and other wildlife, but the rest is diverted to Big Creek, where it powers several hydroelectric plants in succession.

The area now covered by the lake was extensively logged before the dam was built, and an extensive log flume system several miles long was constructed to bring logs down the mountain. The town to this day maintains a nostalgic logging theme. Several buildings in town are in fact old, converted sawmills. Adjacent to the lake is Camp Edison, built and operated by SCE.

On August 13, 1943, Grace Craycroft (née Shaver), the daughter of pioneer lumberman Charles B. Shaver after whom the lake and town is named, drowned after suffering from a heart attack whilst attempting to save a 12-year-old boy from drowning.

The reality television shows Endurance: High Sierras and Capture were filmed at Shaver Lake in the summers of 2006 and 2013, respectively. The lake was also the filming location of the HBO Max reality show Karma during the summer of 2019.

The Shaver Lake Trophy Trout Project is a non-profit organization to educate the public on fishing and make Shaver Lake a fishing destination.

Camp Chawanakee, a Scout camp, is located on a peninsula on the southern shore of Shaver Lake. BSA troops from all over California attend each summer. The camp's facilities include canoeing, sailing, row boats, kayaking, swimming, hiking, rifle shooting, shotgun, archery, horse riding, rock wall, zip lining, fishing, crafts, and many other activities.

Camp El-O-Win, a summer camp operated by the non-profit "Friends of Camp El O Win", is located on a plot of 58 acres about 11 miles down the road from Camp Chawanakee.

== See also ==
- List of dams and reservoirs in California
- List of lakes in California
- Shaver Lake, California
- Huntington Lake
