= John Samuel Eastwood =

American engineer

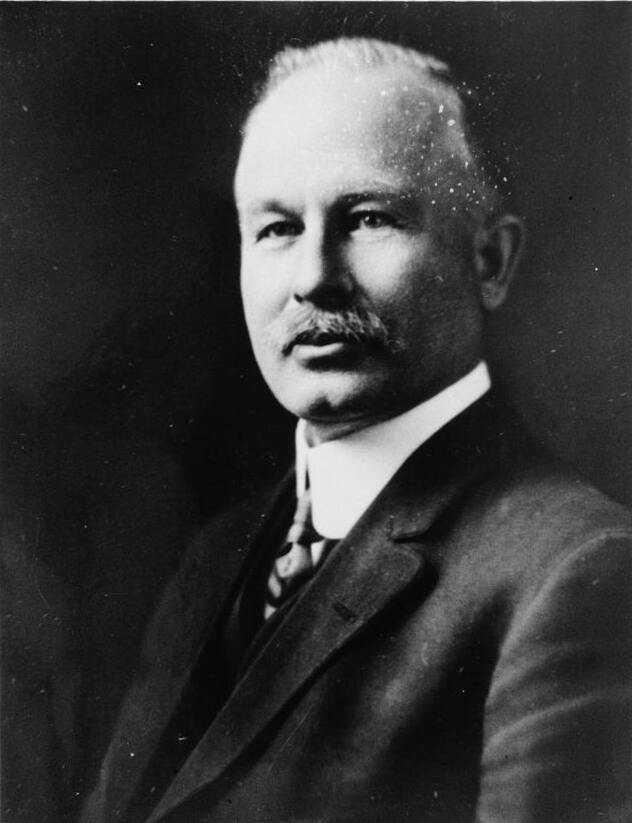
- John Samuel Eastwood
- Born: 1857 near Minneapolis, Minnesota, U.S.
- Died: August 1924 (aged 66–67) near Fresno, California, U.S.
- Resting place: Mountain View Cemetery (Fresno)
- Education: University of Minnesota

John Samuel Eastwood (1857, in Minnesota – 1924, in California) was an American engineer who built the world's first reinforced concrete multiple-arch dam on bedrock foundation at Hume Lake, California, in 1908, and was one of California's pioneers of hydroelectric power production. Eastwood's papers are held at the Water Resources Collections and Archives, University of California, Riverside.

== Early life ==
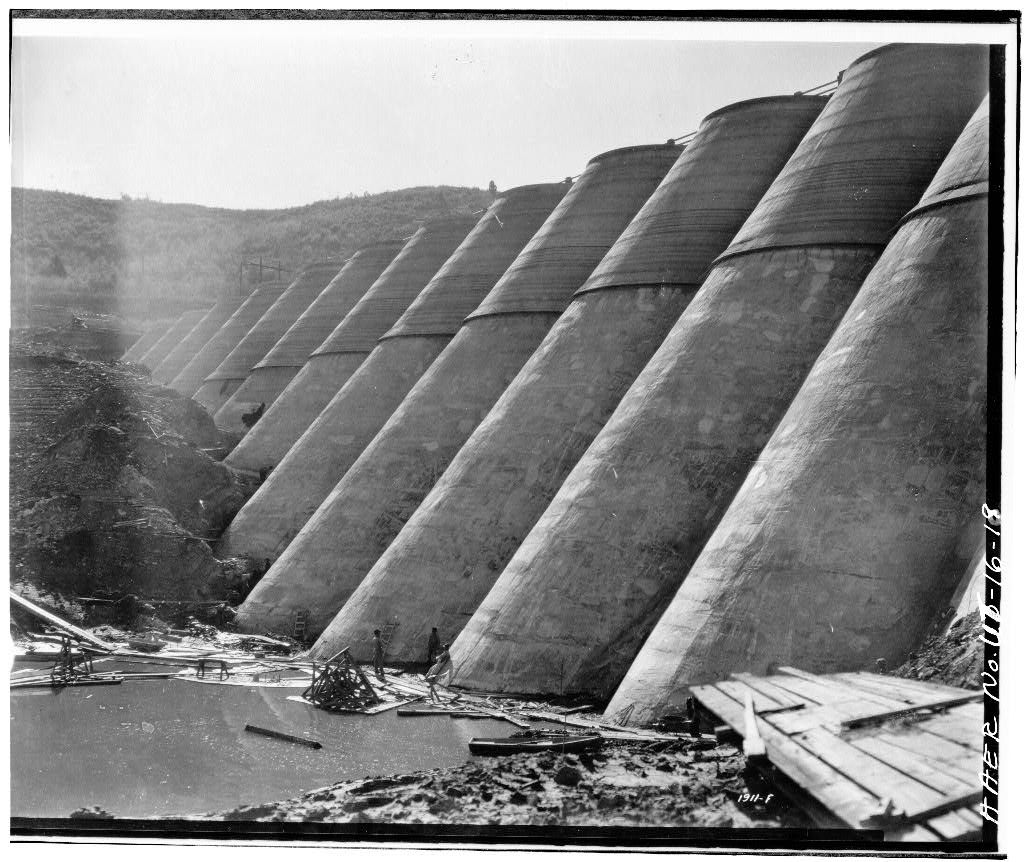
Mountain Dell Dam

Born to Dutch parents in 1857 in Minnesota, Eastwood attended the University of Minnesota as a civil engineering student; prior to graduation in 1880 he headed west to work on railroad construction projects in the Pacific Northwest, including on the Northern Pacific Railroad. In 1883, he moved to Fresno, California and established an office as civil engineer and surveyor. He became Fresno's first City Engineer in 1885, but apparently was not well suited for office–bureaucratic life and soon resigned. For the remainder of his career he focused on work within the private sector or as a consulting engineer. In 1886, Eastwood began work for the Smith & Moore Lumber Company (later known as the Kings River Lumber Co.) laying out the right of way for the company's 54 mi. long lumber flume to the Sanger, Ca. lumber yards and estimating the potential yield of timber lots in the Converse Basin.

Early in 1895, he became chief engineer of the San Joaquin Electric Company, and was responsible for the design and construction of one of California's early hydroelectric plants. As described by George Low in the April 1896 Journal of Electricity, Eastwood employed the nascent technology of long-distance alternating current power transmission in creating a hydroelectric power system for the Fresno area. At the time, Eastwood's hydroelectric plant was considered a groundbreaking achievement, due to its record setting penstock head (1,410 ft.), long-distance power transmission (35 miles), and high voltage 3-phase output (11,000 volts). Unfortunately, the financial capabilities of the company proved insufficient to meet the great cost of constructing the dam in the remote reaches of the mountains, and, as a result, Eastwood was forced to rely on an undammed, natural supply of water to drive the turbines and generators. It was this inability to impound and store runoff, along with interference in seasonal water runoff by the Fresno Gas and Electric Company, that led to the demise of the San Joaquin Electric Company in 1899 after a long drought dried up the North Fork of the San Joaquin River.

== Big Creek Complex ==
Shortly thereafter, Eastwood became engaged with the Pacific Light and Power Company as engineer in charge of designing a large hydroelectric project on the South Fork of the San Joaquin River. This has since become known as the Big Creek Hydroelectric Project, presently operated by the Southern California Edison Company. The Pacific Light and Power Company was controlled by the famous financier and electric railroad magnate Henry Huntington, in partnership with A.G. Wishon, Alan C. Balch, and William Kerckhoff. Eastwood had great hopes for the Big Creek project, and he planned it to include storage dams to ensure that a drought could not stop its power production.

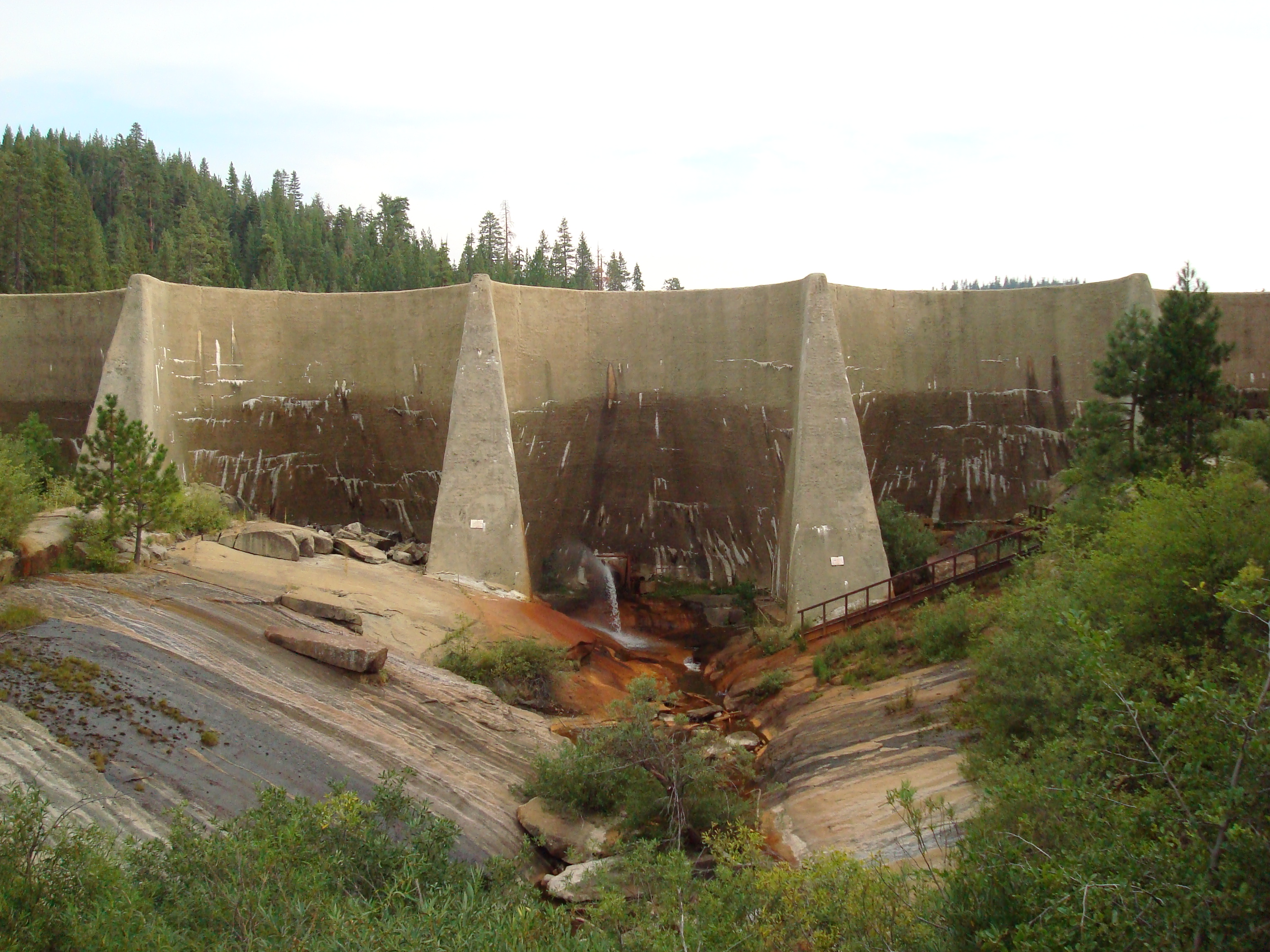
Hume Lake Dam, completed 1909, displaying its reinforced concrete 50-foot (15 m)-span arches resting on inclined vertical buttresses

Although Big Creek was for the most part designed prior to 1907, financial difficulties associated with the Panic of 1907 delayed Huntington's ability to initiate construction for several years. While designing the Big Creek project, Eastwood had devised an inexpensive type of reinforced concrete dam design which minimized the amount of material required and, consequently, reduced construction costs. In 1908, while waiting for work on Big Creek to begin, he designed and built the Hume Lake Dam for the Hume-Bennett Lumber Company. This structure is located in the Sierra Nevada about forty-five miles south of Big Creek. The first of its kind, its completion in 1909 demonstrated the practicality of the multiple-arch design. Shortly thereafter, Eastwood received the contract for the design of a multiple-arch dam to supersede the 1884 Big Bear Valley Arch Dam near San Bernardino in Southern California.

Eastwood envisaged the use of multiple-arch dams in the construction of the Big Creek project, but these hopes were dashed when, in November 1910, he was dismissed from all association with the project. Although he was awarded 5,400 shares of stock in the newly formed Pacific Light and Power Corporation (which was legally distinct from the earlier PL&P Company), this financial interest soon disappeared when in the summer of 1912 Huntington, as majority stockholder, assessed all owners of Pacific Light and Power Corporation stock $5 per share to help pay for the construction of Big Creek. Unable to pay the assessment ($27,000) on his stock, Eastwood was forced to relinquish his stake in the PL&P Corporation. Following this abrupt separation from the Big Creek project at the age of 53, Eastwood was left with only modest financial holdings and, as a means of survival, he began actively pursuing a career devoted to the design of multiple arch dams.

== Multiple arch dams ==
In the early 20th century, Salt Lake City regularly experienced severe water shortages in mid-winter and late summer. To alleviate this, bonds were floated in 1914 to finance the construction of three storage dams, the largest being Mountain Dell Dam in Parley's Canyon, ten miles east of the city, that was built in two stages from 1914 to 1925.

Earlier, Eastwood had built four dams in California and his reputation as dam designer was growing. He had written several articles in Western Engineering describing his Big Bear Valley Dam, Los Verjeles Dam (in Yuba County, California) and Kennedy Dam (in Jackson, California), and had also published a four-page promotional "supplement" distribution with copies of the March 1915 Western Engineering.

Following the initial construction of Mountain Dell Dam, Eastwood continued his career in water resource development and dam design, becoming involved in projects in California, Idaho, Arizona, Mexico, and British Columbia.

He was not an armchair engineer, and he spent much of his life in the field working on practical problems of water control. He worked as a practicing engineer until the end of his life, when, in August 1924, at the age of 67, he drowned while swimming in the Kings River east of Fresno. He was buried in Mountain View Cemetery near Fresno, a cemetery that he had surveyed and laid out during his time as Fresno's first City Engineer.

The Eastwood powerhouse at Shaver Lake, California was named after him. Built in 1987, the 200 MW pumped storage hydroelectric plant is located underground and was carved out of solid granite.

== Work ==
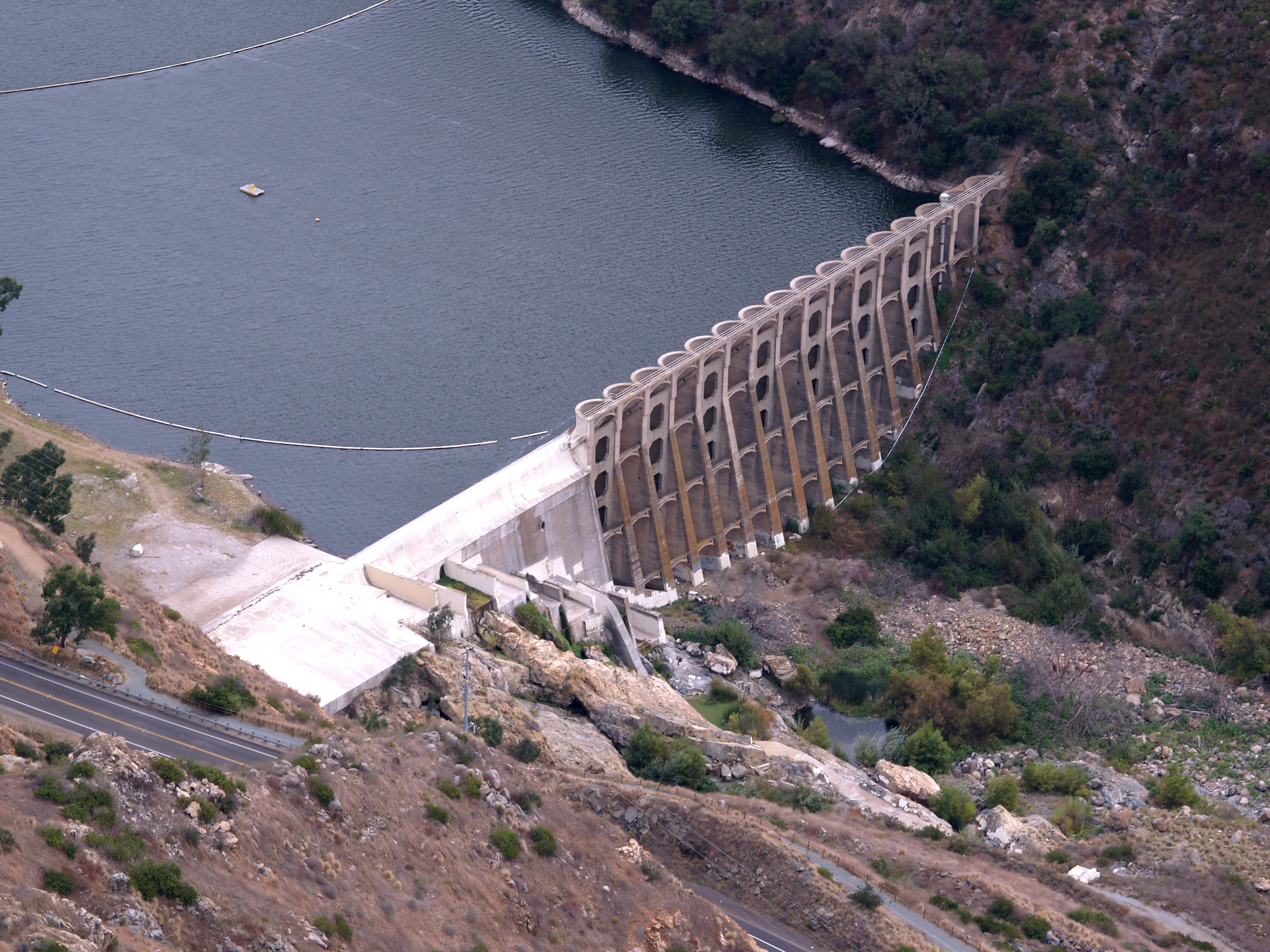
Lake Hodges Dam, 1918

Throughout his career, Eastwood designed a total of 17 dams: one in Utah, one in Arizona, one in British Columbia, and two in Idaho, with the remaining 12 located in California. His notable projects include:

- Hume Lake Dam, Fresno County, California (1908)
- Big Bear Lake Dam, Big Bear, California (1912)
- Mountain Dell Dam, Salt Lake County, Utah (1914-1925)
- Lake Hodges Dam, Escondido, California (1918)
- Fish Creek Dam, Carey, Idaho (1919)
- Anyox Hydroelectric Dam, Anyox, British Columbia (early 1920s)
- Cave Creek Dam, Maricopa County, Arizona (1923)
- Little Rock Dam, Littlerock, California (1924)
- Florence Lake Dam (1926)
