= Mammoth Pool Reservoir =

Reservoir in California, USA

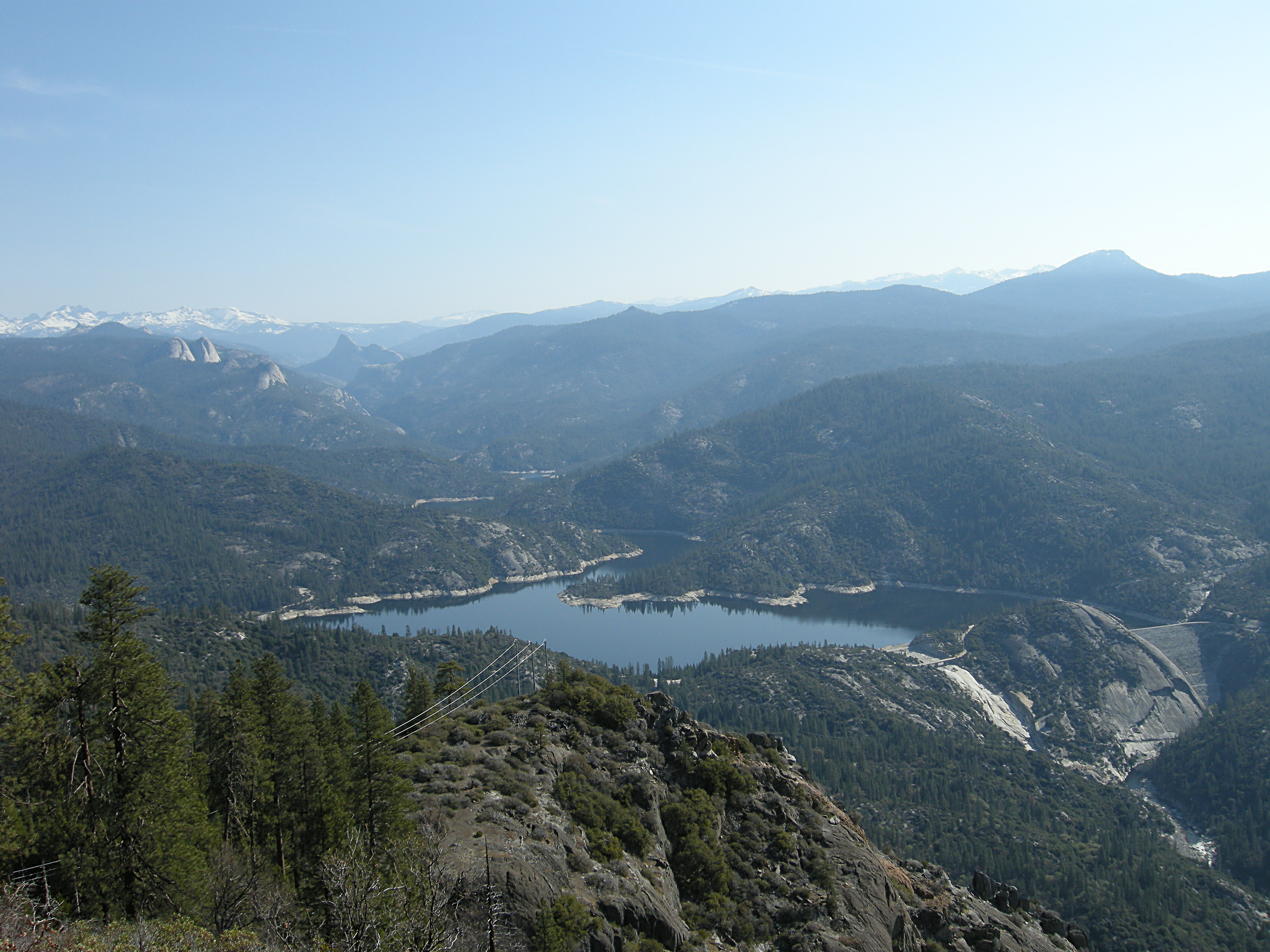

- Location within California Location within the United States
- Location: Sierra National Forest; Fresno County, California; Madera County, California
- Coordinates: 37°21′15″N 119°18′32″W
- Type: Reservoir
- Primary inflows: San Joaquin River
- Primary outflows: San Joaquin River
- Catchment area: 998 sq mi (2,580 km^{2})
- Basin countries: United States
- Max. length: 5 mi (8.0 km)
- Max. width: 1.5 mi (2.4 km)
- Surface area: 1,100 acres (450 ha)
- Water volume: 123,000 acre⋅ft (152,000,000 m^{3})
- Surface elevation: 3,330 ft (1,010 m)
- References: U.S. Geological Survey Geographic Names Information System: Mammoth Pool Reservoir

Mammoth Pool Reservoir is a reservoir on the San Joaquin River in the Sierra Nevada, within the Sierra National Forest in California. It creates the border between Fresno County and Madera County. It is about 45 miles (72 km) north-northeast of Fresno.

== Hydroelectric power ==
The 123,000 acre⋅ft (152,000,000 m^{3}) reservoir is formed by Mammoth Pool Dam, an earth-fill dam completed in 1960. It was built by Southern California Edison for hydroelectricity production. The dam's power plant can produce up to 190 megawatts. The dam, reservoir and power plant are part of the Big Creek Hydroelectric Project, perhaps the most extensive hydroelectric system in the world.

== Recreation ==
The reservoir is also a recreation area. Activities at the lake include, swimming, fishing, camping and boating.

The reservoir is closed to the public during the month of May and the first half of June to allow migrating deer to swim across the reservoir so as to spend the summer in the Sierra Nevada highlands.

The reservoir is inaccessible following the first snowstorm, usually occurring in November, as the access road is not snowplowed.

== 2020 forest fire ==
Road access to a campground beside the reservoir was blocked by the Creek Fire on 5 September 2020, at which point officials recommended that campers wade into the reservoir for their own protection. Many were later evacuated by helicopter.

== See also ==
- List of dams and reservoirs in California
- List of lakes in California
