= Lake Thomas A Edison =

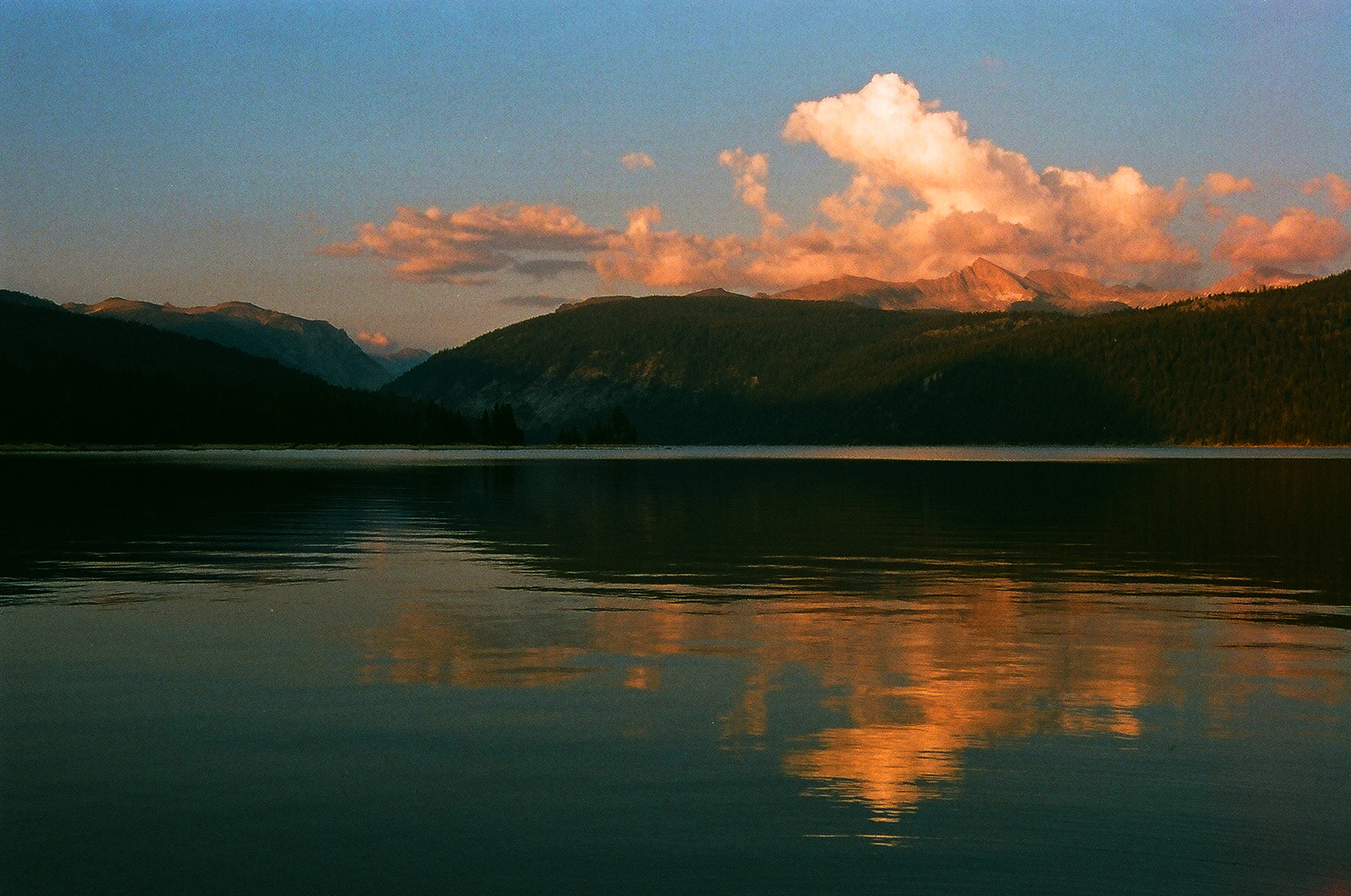

- Location within California Location within the United States
- Location: Fresno County, California
- Coordinates: 37°22′58″N 118°58′34″W
- Type: Reservoir
- Primary inflows: Mono Creek, Cold Creek
- Primary outflows: Mono Creek
- Catchment area: 88 square miles (230 km^{2})
- Basin countries: United States
- Max. length: 3.5 miles (5.6 km)
- Max. width: 1 mile (1.6 km)
- Surface area: 1,878 acres (760 ha)
- Average depth: 67 feet (20 m)
- Water volume: 125,000 acre-feet (154,000,000 m^{3})
- Shore length^{1}: 13 miles (21 km)
- Surface elevation: 7,648 feet (2,331 m)
- ^{1} Shore length is not a well-defined measure.

Lake Thomas A Edison (also known as Thomas A. Edison Lake and Edison Lake) is a reservoir in the Sierra National Forest and in Fresno County, California. It is in the Sierra Nevada, and near the Pacific Crest Trail.

The reservoir's waters are impounded by Vermilion Valley Dam (National ID CA00441), which was completed in 1954 (72 years ago). The reservoir and dam are part of the Big Creek Hydroelectric Project.

== Hydrology ==
The reservoir discharges into Mono Creek, a tributary of the South Fork San Joaquin River. However, some of its water is diverted to Huntington Lake by means of the Ward Tunnel.

== Vermilion Valley Dam ==
Vermilion Valley Dam
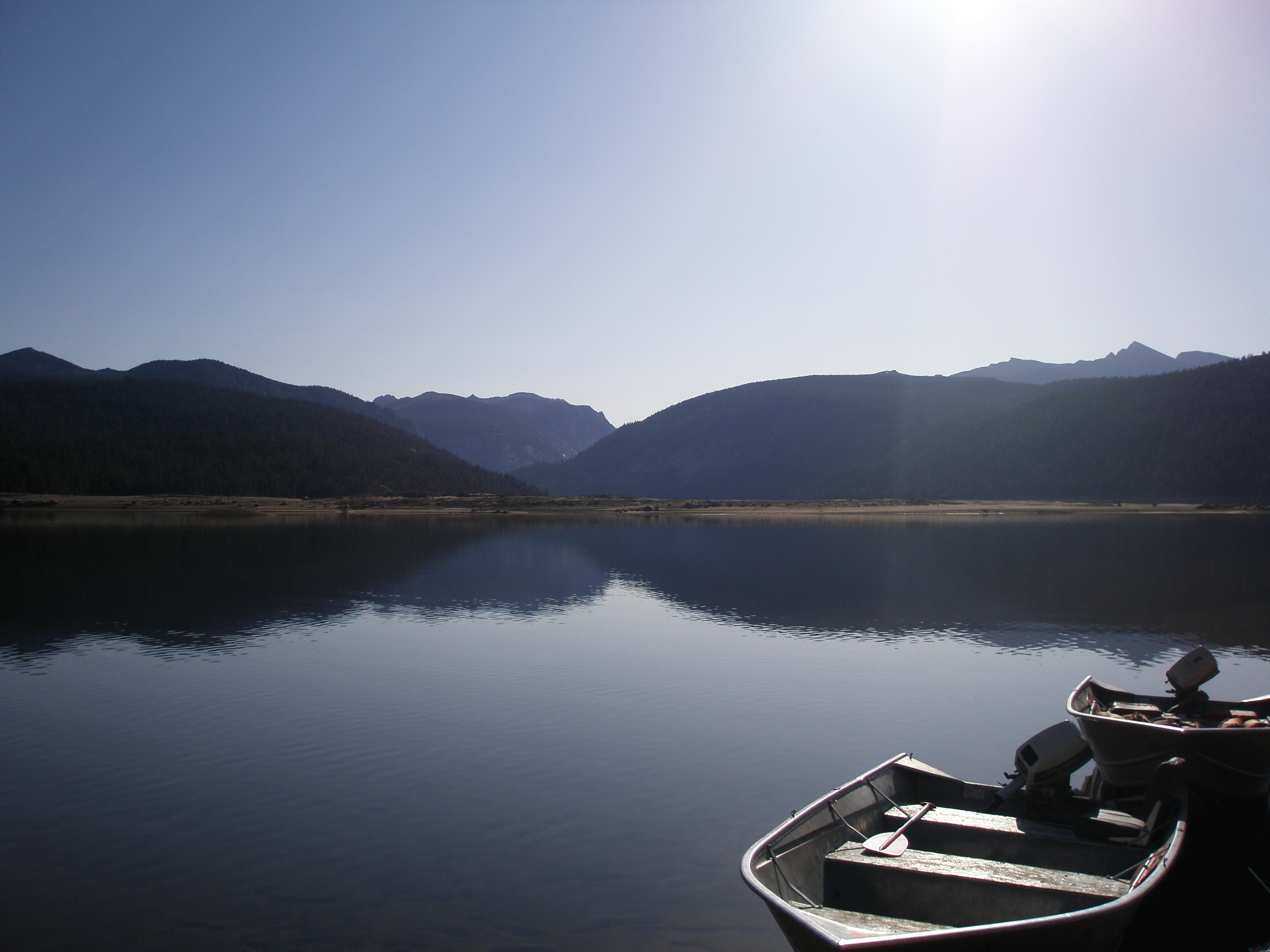
- Interactive map of Vermilion Valley Dam
- Country: United States
- Location: Fresno County, California
- Coordinates: 37°22′12″N 118°59′14″W
- Opening date: 1954
- Owner: Southern California Edison

Dam and spillways
- Type of dam: Earthen
- Impounds: Mono Creek
- Height: 167 feet (51 m)
- Length: 4,234 feet (1,291 m)
- Elevation at crest: 7,650.5 feet (2,331.9 m)
- Width (crest): 20 feet (6.1 m)
- Dam volume: 4,200,000 cubic yards (3,200,000 m^{3})

Reservoir
- Creates: Lake Thomas A Edison
- Total capacity: 125,000 acre-feet (154,000,000 m^{3})
- Catchment area: 88 square miles (230 km^{2})
- Maximum length: 3.5 miles (5.6 km)
- Maximum width: 1 mile (1.6 km)

Vermilion Valley Dam is an earthen dam 4,234 feet (1,291 m) long and 167 feet (51 m) high, with 8 feet (2.4 m) of freeboard. Southern California Edison owns the dam.

== Recreation ==
Located in Sierra National Forest near the Pacific Crest Trail, Lake Thomas A Edison is the centerpiece of Vermilion Valley Resort and Vermillion Campground, which support boating, camping, fishing, swimming, canoeing, kayaking, and horseback riding.

== Access ==
The lake is three hours away by car from Fresno. Take State Route 168 east to Huntington Lake, head east on Kaiser Pass Road. The road crosses Kaiser Pass (elevation 9,175 feet (2,797 m)) and closes during the winter months. The United States Forest Service does not recommend it for buses, large motor homes, or vehicles towing trailers.

A ferry crosses the lake twice a day (Inactive in 2021 due to extreme low levels of water - travel service to/from the trailhead can be arranged through Vermillion Valley Resort or hikers may follow a trail along the north side of the lake for trail access), linking Vermilion Valley Resort with the John Muir Wilderness trailhead and providing access to and from the John Muir Trail and Pacific Crest Trail.

== Nomenclature ==
The lake was named after American inventor Thomas Edison to mark the 75th anniversary of his invention of the incandescent light bulb. The dam was named after the valley it flooded, noted for its reddish soil.

== See also ==
- List of dams and reservoirs in California
- List of lakes in California

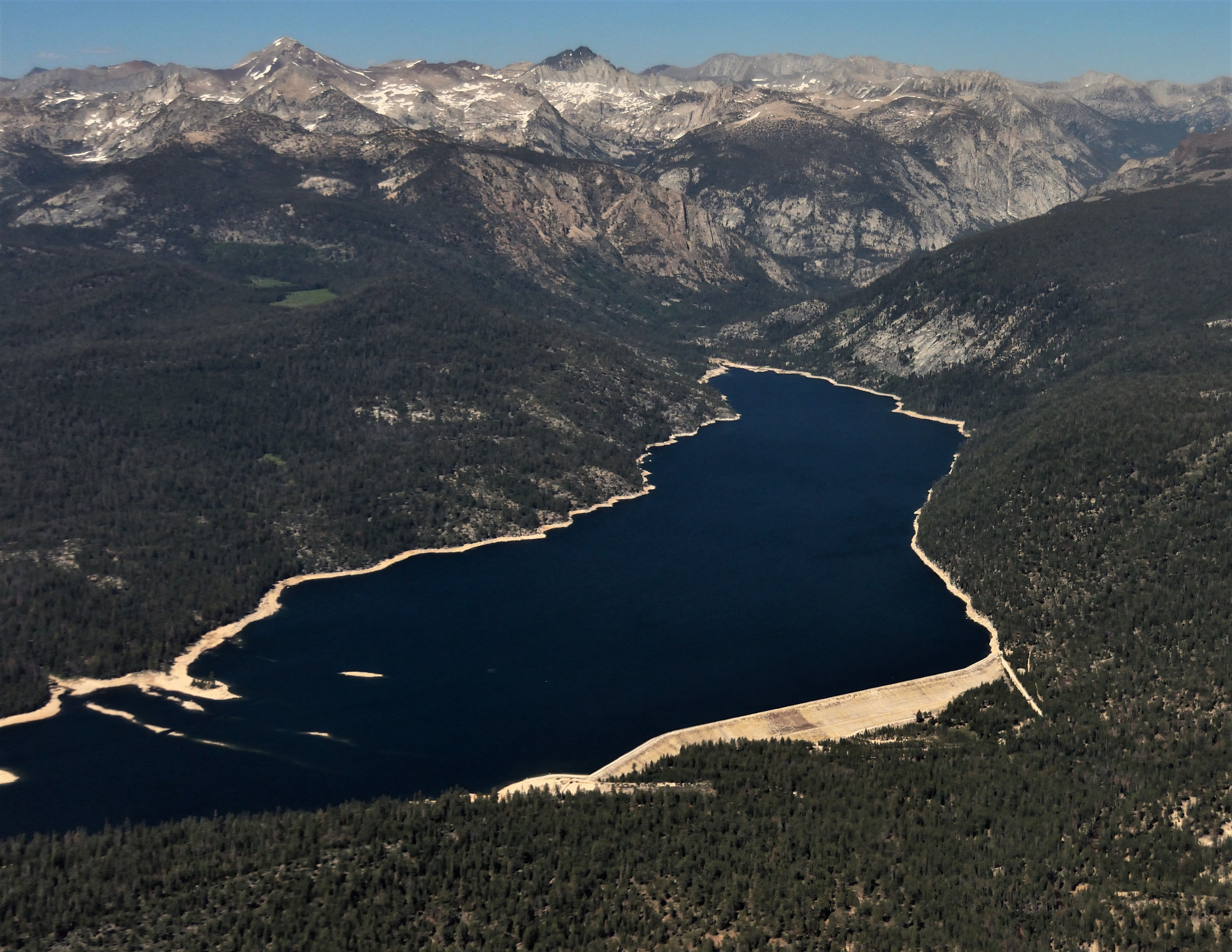
Lake Edison, aerial looking northeast

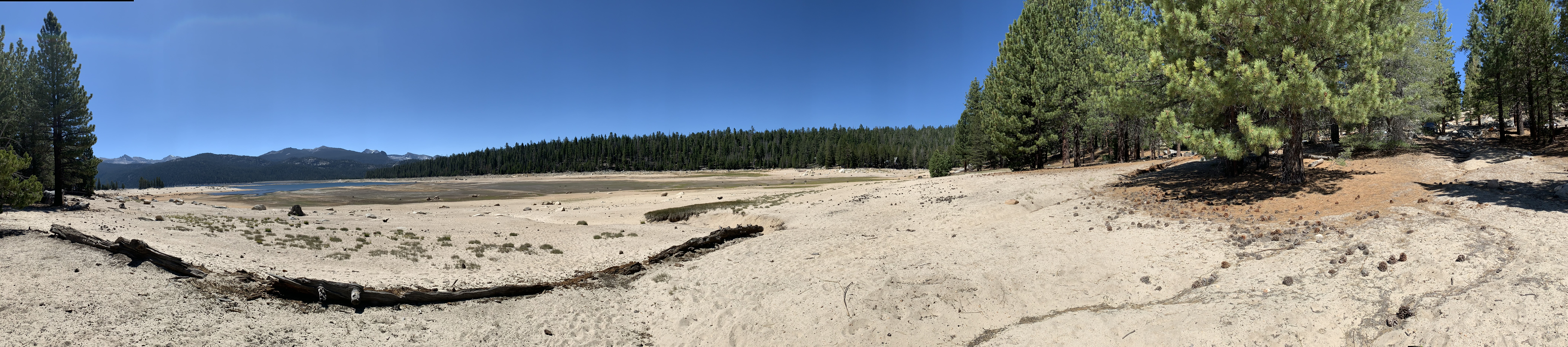
Lake Edison, southern shoreline looking north. Taken from the edge of the lake when the lake is at full capacity.
