= Florence Lake Dam =

- Location within California
- Country: United States
- Coordinates: 37°16′21″N 118°57′59″W
- Opening date: 1926; 100 years ago
- Owner: Southern California Edison

Dam and spillways
- Type of dam: Concrete multiple-arch
- Impounds: South Fork San Joaquin River
- Height: 154 ft (47 m)
- Length: 3,156 ft (962 m)

Reservoir
- Creates: Florence Lake
- Total capacity: 64,600 acre⋅ft (79,700,000 m^{3})
- Catchment area: 171 mi^{2} (440 km^{2})
- Surface area: 296 acres (120 ha)

Florence Lake Dam is a concrete multiple-arch dam on the South Fork of the San Joaquin River, in Fresno County, California in the United States. The 171-foot (52 m) high dam was designed by John S. Eastwood and completed in 1926 (two years after Eastwood's death) as part of the Big Creek Hydroelectric Project, an extensive hydroelectric system in the central Sierra Nevada. Its reservoir, Florence Lake, provides for water diversion to Huntington Lake and Big Creek Powerhouses Nos. 1–3 via the 13-mile (21 km) Ward Tunnel.

== See also ==
- List of dams and reservoirs in California
