= Rockville =

Rockville may refer to:

== Places ==
=== Australia ===
- Rockville, Queensland, a suburb in the city of Toowoomba

=== Canada ===
- Rockville, Nova Scotia
- Rockville, Ontario, a community in Northeastern Ontario

=== Iceland ===
- Rockville Air Station, a former United States Air Force General Surveillance Radar station that operated from 1952 to 1992

=== New Zealand ===
- Rockville, New Zealand, a rural community near Collingwood, New Zealand

=== South Africa ===
- Rockville, Soweto, Gauteng

=== United States ===
- Rockville, Alabama, census-designated place
- Rockville, California, unincorporated community
- Rockville, Connecticut, census-designated place
- Rockville, Georgia, unincorporated community
- Rockville, Indiana, town
  - Rockville Air Force Station, a former United States Air Force General Surveillance Radar station that operated from 1951 to 1966
- Rockville, Iowa, unincorporated community
- Rockville, Maryland, city
  - Rockville (WMATA station), a subway station
  - Rockville Park Historic District
  - Rockville Pike (Maryland Route 355), a road in Montgomery County, Maryland
- Rockville, Minnesota, city
- Rockville, Missouri, city
- Rockville, Nebraska, village
- Rockville, Orange County, New York, hamlet
- Rockville Centre, New York, village referred to as "Rockville"
- Rockville, Ohio, unincorporated community
- Rockville, Pennsylvania, unincorporated community
- Rockville, Rhode Island, village
- Rockville, South Carolina, town
- Rockville, Utah, town
- Rockville, Virginia, unincorporated community
- Rockville, West Virginia, unincorporated community
- Rockville, Wisconsin (disambiguation), multiple places

== Entertainment ==
- "(Don't Go Back To) Rockville", commonly referred to as "Rockville", a song by rock group R.E.M. from their 1984 album Reckoning
- Rockville (TV series), a South African television show
- Welcome to Rockville, a rock festival in Florida

== Other ==
- Rockville Bridge, Pennsylvania
- USS Rockville, a vessel of the United States Navy

== See also ==
- Rockville High School (disambiguation)
- Rockville Station (disambiguation)
- Rockville Township (disambiguation)
