= Friant-Kern Canal =

Aqueduct in California, United States

Coordinates: 36.348839°N 119.103162°W

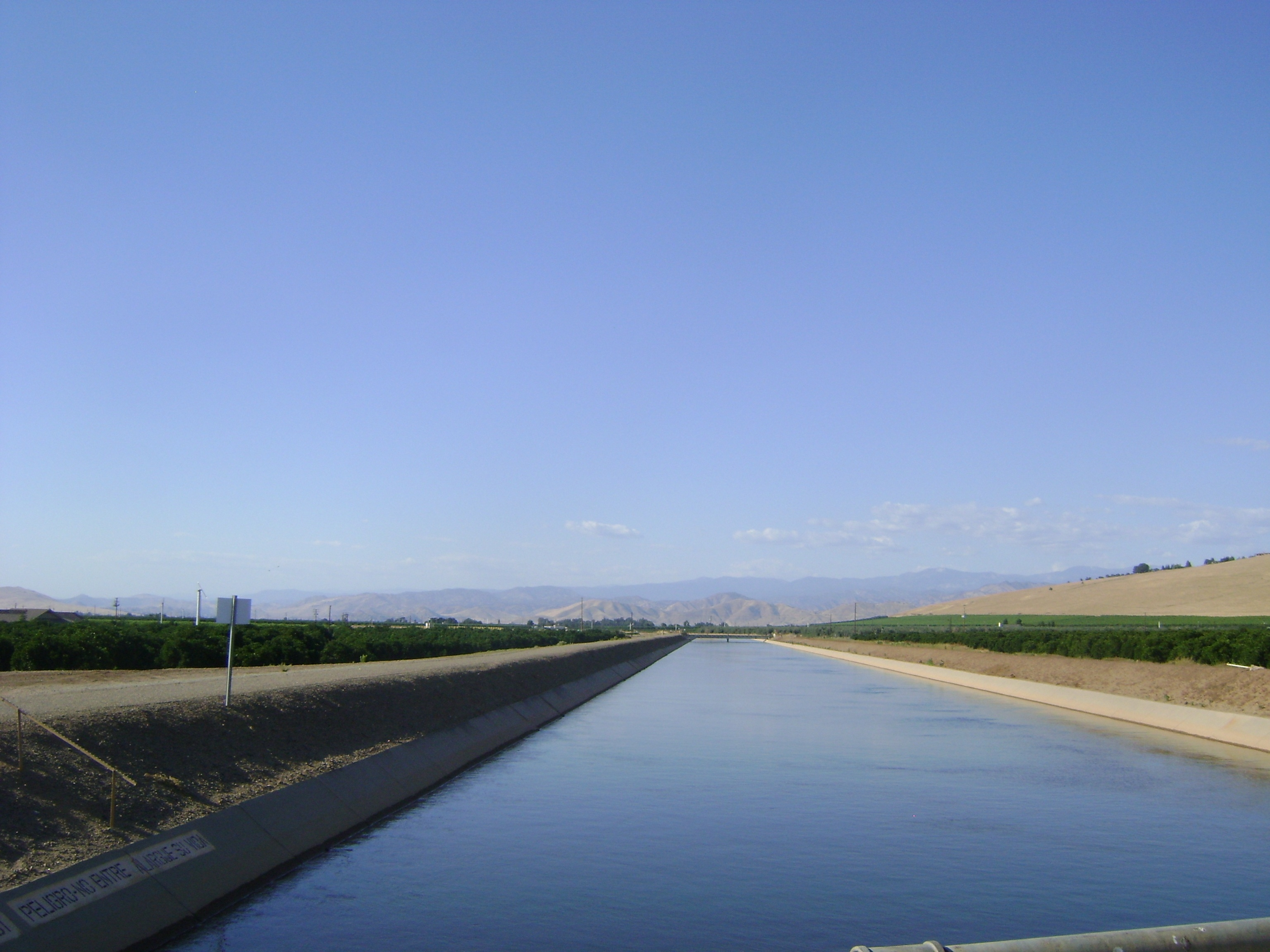
Friant-Kern Canal east of Visalia near Badger and Rocky Hill

The Friant-Kern Canal is a 152 mi (245 km) aqueduct managed by the United States Bureau of Reclamation in Central California to convey water to augment irrigation capacity in Fresno, Tulare, and Kern counties. A part of the Central Valley Project, canal construction began in 1949 and was completed in 1951 at a cost of $60.8 million.

The Friant-Kern Canal begins at the Friant Dam of Millerton Lake, a reservoir on the San Joaquin River north of Fresno, and flows south along the eastern edge of the San Joaquin Valley, ending at the Kern River near Bakersfield. In a typical year, it diverts almost all the flow of the San Joaquin River, leaving the river dry for about 60 miles (97 km) downstream. The Central Valley Project Delta-Mendota Canal replenishes the San Joaquin River at the town of Mendota, and replaces the volume of water being delivered by the Friant-Kern Canal. Average annual throughput is 1,051,000 acre-feet (1.296 km^{3}), with a high of 1,720,000 acre-feet (2.12 km^{3}) in 2005, and a low of 58,000 acre-feet (0.072 km^{3}) in 2015. In the past few years, canal flows have been reduced due to river restoration projects requiring a greater release of water from the Friant Dam into the San Joaquin.

The Friant-Kern Canal capacity is 5,000 cu ft/s (140 m^{3}/s), gradually decreasing to 2,000 cu ft/s (57 m^{3}/s) at its terminus. The canal is built in both concrete-lined and unlined earth sections. It is up to 128 feet (39 m) wide at the top and is 24 feet (7.3 m) wide at the bottom of concrete segments, and 40 to 64 feet (12 to 20 m) wide in earth segments. Water depths range from 11 to 19.9 feet (3.4 to 6.1 m).

== Description ==
Friant-Kern canal delivers water to numerous districts, cities, and up to 15,000 family farms. The canal stems from the Friant Dam located in the Sierra Nevada foothills, near the town of Friant. Built by the Bureau of Reclamation, the dam reaches a height of 319 feet and a length of 3,488 feet storing approximately 520,500 acre feet of water. In addition to storing water, the dam produces renewable energy through a 25 MW power plant operated by Friant Power Authority. Friant-Kern canal combats issues such as subsidence by providing water from the wetter northernmost part of the state to incentivize farmers to pump less groundwater.

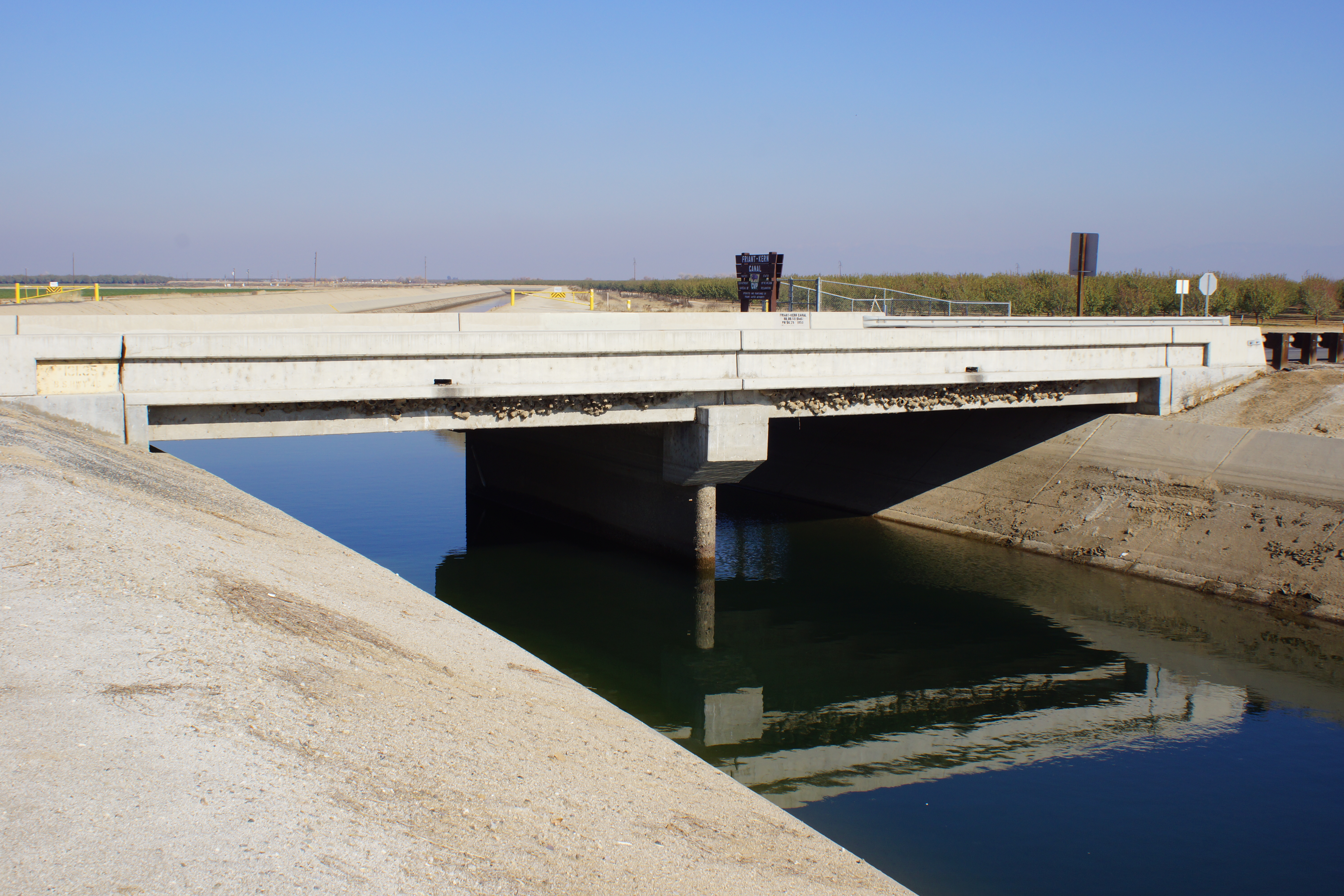
2013, California 46 Bridge over Friant-Kern Canal, Central Valley Project Irrigation System - panoramio

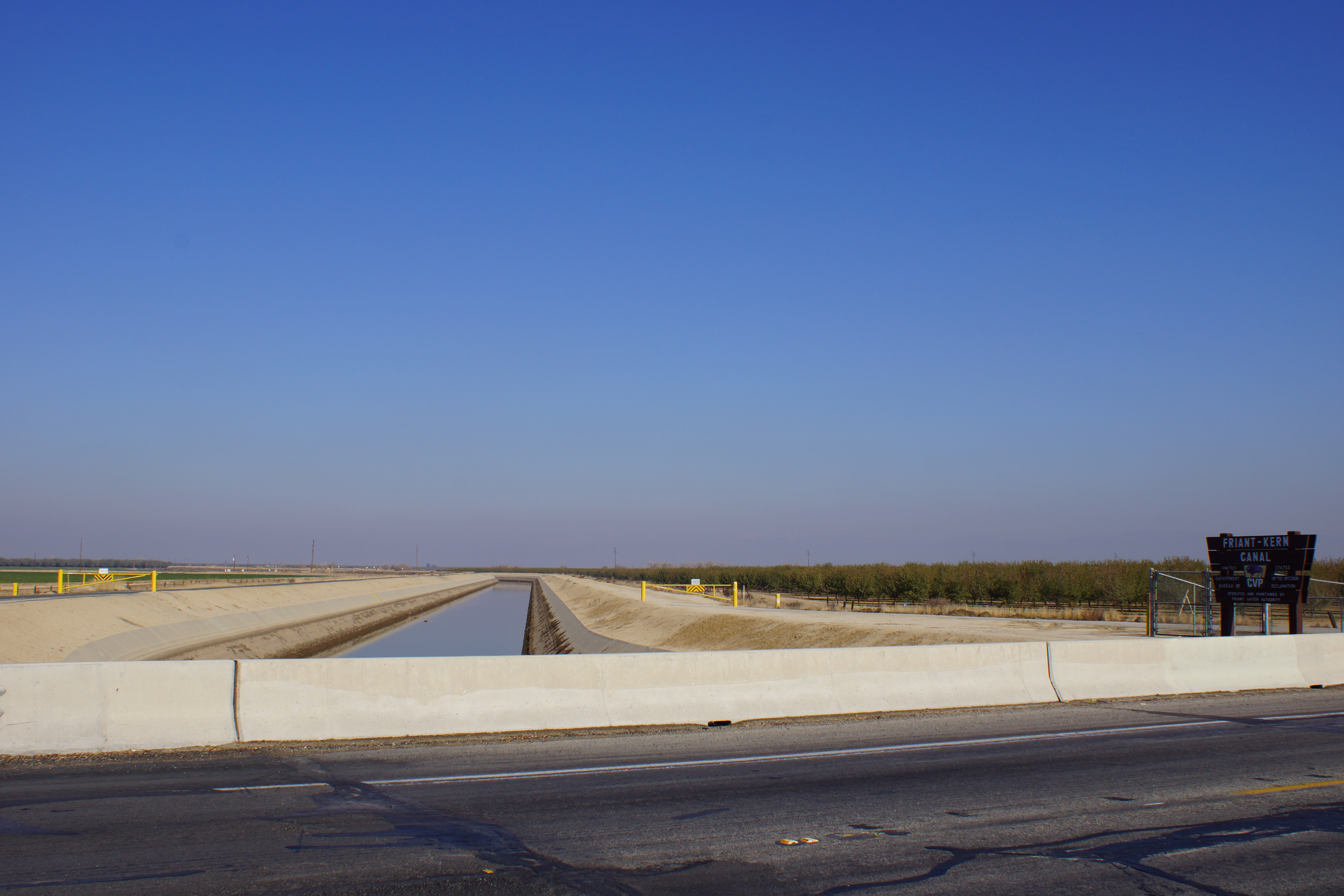
2013, Friant-Kern Canal, Central Valley Project Irrigation System - panoramio

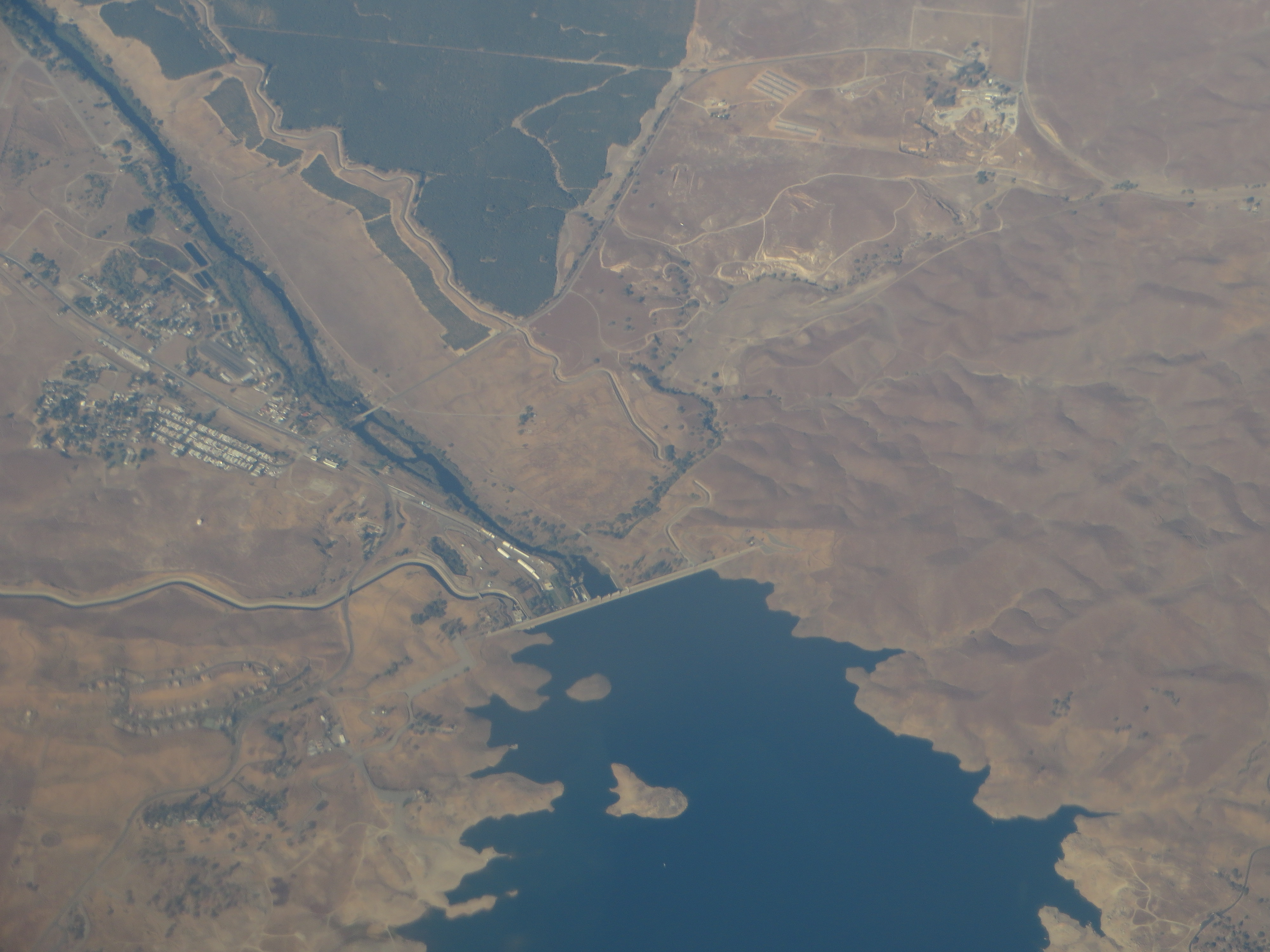
Millerton Lake, Friant, California (21582117291)

The Friant-Kern canal is part of a much larger project called the Central Valley Project or CVP. This water infrastructure system was created for many reasons, one being to ease the detrimental affects associated with excess ground water pumping, particularly by farmers, and to also support the necessary economic development to withstand the massive influx of people entering the state, especially between the years 1920–1950.

== Central Valley Project ==
The Central Valley Project was an ambitious project built to address many different problems affecting the state. The CVP was intended to reduce the impacts of flooding, provide water for varying purposes within the valley, distribute water to different urban centers around the region, generate electricity, and to aid in conservation efforts. The entire project consisted of 20 dams and reservoirs which collectively store about 12 million acre feet of water.

== Issues and concerns ==
=== Environmental Impacts ===
Environmental impacts associated with the Friant-Kern Canal vary across the state. Salmon populations are impacted due to diversion of water from the natural stream flow. Along with depleted stream flows, the dam itself serves as a blockade against salmon traveling upstream in search of appropriate spawning grounds. Due to the diversion of water, dry reaches of riverbed are reported along some portions of the San Joaquin River. Along the river where the bed is dry, riparian habitats are suffering and native flora and fauna are impacted detrimentally. With dry riverbeds and salmon populations suffering, a lawsuit was filed which led to a settlement urging restoration of the river. The river is replenished by the Delta Mendota Canal, but not before negative impacts are observed.

=== Subsidence ===
Subsidence is caused by excess or unsustainable removal of groundwater, typically below an aquitard or confining layer. Up to 60% of the Friant-Kern canal water delivery capacity is negatively affected by land subsidence. This reduction in flow rates in the canal impacts both agricultural and groundwater basins within the service area. Decreased flow rates means more groundwater pumping by farmers and less groundwater recharge by state agencies. Both of these contribute to further subsidence and reductions in the ability to transport water during particularly wet years. By April 2017, the canal had subsided a total of twelve feet since its completion in 1949.

The FWA estimates that current construction aimed towards fixing the subsidence problem will reduce the delivery of class 2 supplies by about 100,000 acre feet/year. Proposed construction consists of the excavation of 400,000 cubic yards of soil and 17,000 cubic yards of rock. Some other materials consist of 450,000 cubic yards of backfill is required along with 35,000 cubic yards of concrete lining material, 500,000 linear feet of aqualastic sealant and 85,000 cubic yards of riprap. Restoring the canal has been postulated to provide an increase of local jobs to an economically depressed region.

=== Invasive species ===
Myriophyllum hippuroides, also known as western watermilfoil has been impacting the canal for quite some time now. These weeds root themselves and reproduce in the earthen areas which are areas lacking cement canal lining. This weed can also attach itself to cracks in the concrete. So after sometime floating down the canal, the weed may find another home to reproduce and propagate from. Chemical treatment is required for the successful removal of the aquatic weed which can grow up to ten feet long. This weed has been reported to clog canals, water meters, and micro irrigation sprinklers. Farmers who are trying to cut back on water usage by using micro irrigation technology are especially susceptible to clogging by these weeds.

== See also ==
- Madera Canal
- Temperance Flat Dam
