= Herndon, California =

Unincorporated community in California, United States

Herndon Sycamore Point, Sycamore, Palo Blanco
- Unincorporated community
- Interactive map of Herndon
- Location in California Herndon (the United States)
- Coordinates: 36°50′12″N 119°55′03″W
- Country: United States
- State: California
- County: Fresno
- Elevation: 299 ft (91 m)

Herndon (formerly, Sycamore) is an unincorporated community in Fresno County, California, United States. It is located 9 miles (14 km) northwest of downtown Fresno, at an elevation of 299 feet (91 m).

== History ==
Herndon began as a steamboat landing on the San Joaquin River called Sycamore Point. It was the year round head of navigation on that river. Sycamore Point was where the steamboats landed supplies for Fort Miller and later the town of Millerton. There was also a ferry on the river near the location from the 1860s until the 1880s. The settlement grew around Sycamore Station after the railroad built a bridge over the river nearby into the town of Sycamore in 1872. The first town post office, was called Palo Blanco while it lasted from September 3, 1872, to September 4, 1873. The failure of an irrigation project crippled the growth of the town. It was not until 1887 that the Herndon post office opened and closed in 1893, and re-opened in 1907.
