= Rock Hill =

Rock Hill may refer to:

- Rock Hill, Georgia, an unincorporated community
- Rock Hill, Indiana, an unincorporated community
- Rock Hill, Louisiana, an unincorporated community
- Rock Hill, Missouri, a suburb of St. Louis
- Rock Hill, New York, hamlet in New York
- Rock Hill (Herkimer County, New York), an elevation in Herkimer County, New York
- Rock Hill, South Carolina, fifth-largest city in South Carolina
- The Aaron Copland House, a National Historic Landmark in Cortlandt Manor, New York, also known as Rock Hill
- Rock Hill, Florida

== See also ==
- Rockhill (disambiguation)
- Rocky Hill (disambiguation)
- Rocky Gap, Virginia
- Rockville (disambiguation)
