= Rocky Hill =

Rocky Hill may refer to:

== Places ==
=== United Kingdom ===
- Rocky Hill, Isles of Scilly, a hamlet on the island of St Mary's

=== United States ===
- Rocky Hill, Tulare County, California, an unincorporated community in Tulare County
- Rocky Hill, Connecticut, a town in Hartford County, Connecticut
- Rocky Hill, Barren County, Kentucky, an unincorporated community
- Rocky Hill, Edmonson County, Kentucky, an unincorporated community
- Rocky Hill, New Jersey, a borough in Somerset County, New Jersey
- Rocky Hill, Ohio, an unincorporated community in Jackson County
- Rocky Hill Castle, a plantation in Lawrence County, Alabama

== People ==
- Rocky Hill (musician) (1946–2009), blues musician from Texas, United States

== See also ==
- Rock Hill (disambiguation)
