= History of California High-Speed Rail =

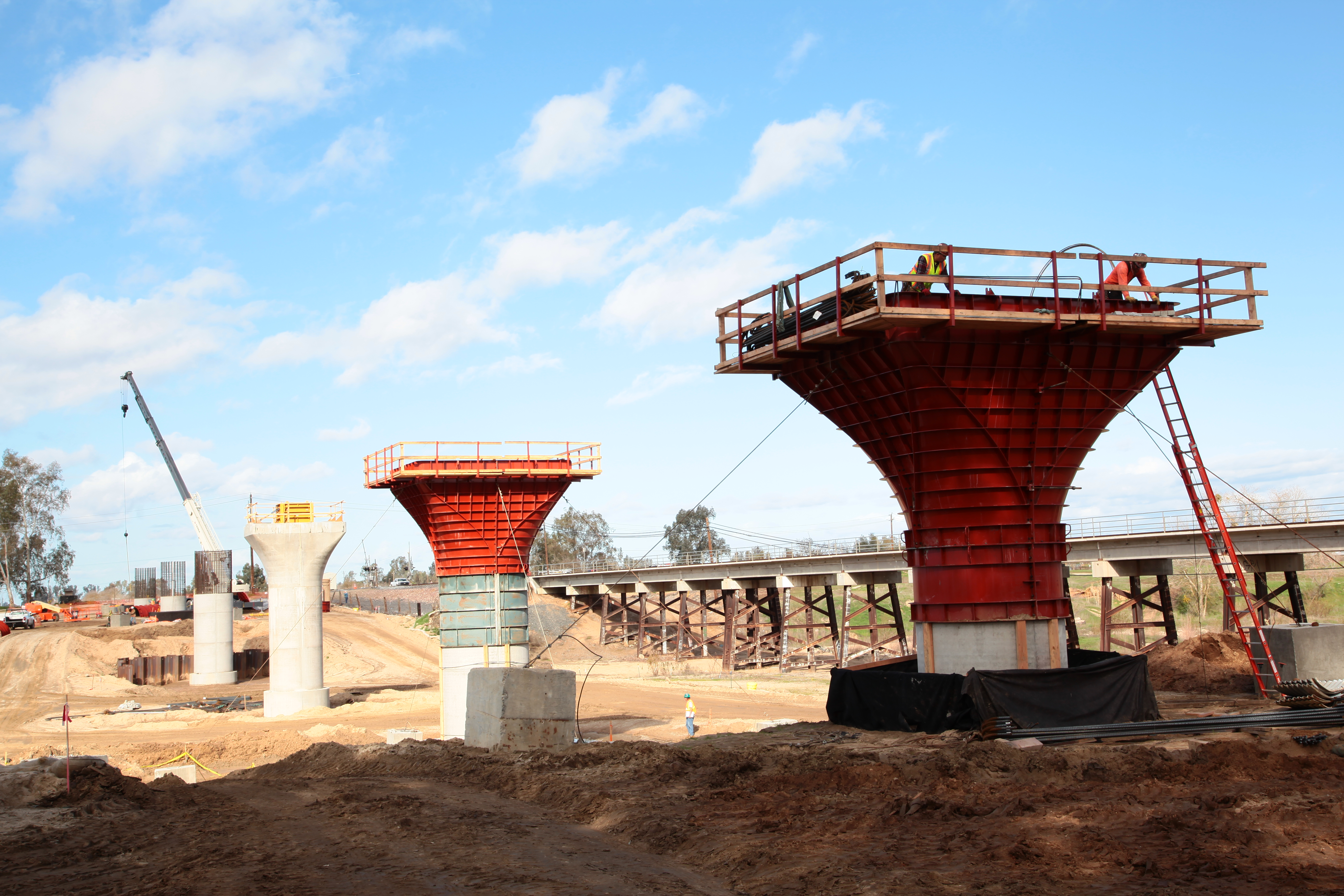
Construction of the Fresno River Viaduct in Madera County, the first permanent structure to be constructed as part of California High-Speed Rail, in January 2016

The California High-Speed Rail Authority was established in 1996 after decades of advocacy for building a high speed rail system in California. The passage of Proposition 1A in 2008, followed by the awarding of federal stimulus funds in 2010, established the initial funding for the California High-Speed Rail system. Construction contracts began to be awarded in 2013, and the groundbreaking ceremony for initial construction was held on January 6, 2015.

== Discussion of HSR alternatives ==
Instead of risking the large expenditures of high-speed rail, some suggested that existing transportation methods should be increased to meet transportation needs. In a report commissioned by the Authority, a comparison was made to the needed infrastructure improvements if high-speed rail were not constructed. According to the report, the cost of building equivalent capacity to the $68.4 billion (YOE) Phase 1 Blended plan, in airports and freeways, is estimated to be at minimum $119 billion (YOE) for 4,295 new lane-miles (6,912 km) of highway, plus $38.6 billion (YOE) for 115 new airport gates and 4 new runways, for a total estimated cost of $158 billion.

In the 2023 Project Update Report, the cost of building equivalent capacity to the $88.5 to $127.9 billion (YOE$) Phase 1 Blended plan was revised to $130 to $215 billion (YOE$) for about 4,200 more highway lane-miles, 91 more airport gates and two new airport runways.

As late as 2010, the Japanese government offered to finance the project with long-term, low interest loans, provided California would adopt Shinkansen bullet-train technology.

Elon Musk proposed Hyperloop as a replacement for HSR. Musk had previously criticized the high-speed rail project as being too expensive and not technologically advanced enough. However, Hyperloop is an unproven technology for its stated purpose. The entire route would be underground, requiring massive tunneling. There are also major issues concerning how it could be implemented in a large scale public transit system format.

== Legislative history ==
Before 1992. Governor Jerry Brown had long been an advocate of a high-speed rail system for California. In his first two terms as governor (1975–1983) he signed legislation into law for the study of a high-speed rail system. In September 1982, the California legislature passed AB 3647, authorizing the construction of a $2bn “bullet train” between Los Angeles and San Diego, including the issuance of $1.25bn in state bonds. Brown signed the legislation that same month, and it became law in October that year. In 1992 in his run for the Presidency the United States he continued to show his support for it. Then, in 1993 the Intercity High-Speed Rail Commission was created to conduct studies and prepare plans.

1992. At the federal level, in 1992 the San Francisco–Los Angeles rail corridor was proposed in the Intermodal Surface Transportation Efficiency Act as one of five high speed rail corridors.

1996. In 1996 the California High-Speed Rail Authority (CHSRA), was established by SB 1420 to begin formal planning in preparation for a ballot measure in 1998 or 2000. The ballot measure was originally scheduled to be put before voters in the 2004 general election; however, the state legislature voted twice to move it back, first to 2006, and finally to 2008 when 53% of voters approved the issuing of $9 billion in bonds for high speed rail in Proposition 1A.

2008. The U.S. Congress enacted the Passenger Rail Investment and Improvement Act of 2008 (PRIIA), which among other things required the states to develop passenger rail plans.

2013. In May 2013, the California Department of Transportation (Caltrans) released its 2013 State Rail Plan. This helped provide a new perspective that viewed the HSR project as the backbone of a statewide rail modernization plan. This has been used by the Authority in allocating funds to other California rail systems that support passenger rail goals and feed into the HSR system. The California State Rail Plan was updated by Caltrans in 2018 and again in 2024; these updates continue to refer to California high-speed rail as the 'backbone' of the state's passenger rail system.

2014. In Jerry Brown's second two terms as Governor (2011 to 2019), in 2014 25% of California's Cap and Trade revenue was allocated to the HSR system. In 2017, this was extended into 2030.

2022. SB 198 established the priority of bringing a working HSR line into operation as soon as possible in the Central Valley.

== Changes under Gov. Newsom ==
Citing delays, cost overruns, and lack of transparency from the project's leadership, Governor Gavin Newsom reaffirmed the state's commitment to the project on February 12, 2019. Newsom said the state will prioritize the construction of a segment already underway in California's Central Valley, arguing it would revitalize the economically depressed region. The state will complete the planning for the remaining segments and seek federal funds for their construction. He also said he would replace the head of the state board that oversees the project and pledged more accountability for contractors that run over on costs. Subsequently, the Chair of the Authority, Dan Richards, was replaced by Tom Richard (then the Vice-Chair), and Brian P. Kelly was brought in as the new CEO in 2018.

== Project Plans ==
=== 2022 Business Plan and 2023 Project Update Report ===
CAHSR connections to other rail systems and "bookend" investments. Not all the other lines are named, and Madera (just south of the wye, between Merced and Fresno) is not shown. Red stars indicate investments in other rail systems.

The 2023 Project Update Report was released on March 1, 2023. Some of the updated information included was:

- An updated program baseline budget and schedule
- Updated capital costs to complete Phase 1

The 2022 Business Plan included information regarding the project's status, goals, and activities. In order to make an effective, self-supporting Initial Operating Segment, due to financial constraints, the Authority was focusing on five areas:

1. Creating the infrastructure for a viable Interim IOS. That means adding the additional 52 miles (84 km) to create an 171-mile (275 km) HSR-operable segment between Merced and Bakersfield, and creating the train stations along the route. Advanced design contracts were awarded for both extensions, and work on route acquisition and construction was to be performed as funding becomes available. On October 10, 2022, the contract for the first phase of station creation (expected to take about 30 months) was let.
2. Creating an operational HSR system for testing. A track and systems contract will need to be let to install tracks, power, and control systems for the initial 119 miles (192 km) of right-of-way, and HSR train sets will need to be acquired to test on it. When the track and systems work along the initial 119 miles (192 km) is completed (the 2023 Project Update Report projects this to be by 2028), there will be a two-year period of testing the HSR trainsets, trackage, and control systems while construction proceeds on the Merced and Bakersfield extensions. The Authority plans to restructure and re-issue the track and systems procurement in 2023. The Authority has applied for federal funds to purchase six trainsets capable of speeds in excess of 200 miles per hour (320 km/h). The 2023 Project Update Report projects the purchase of these to be made in 2024.
3. Readying the entire Phase 1 system for construction. The segments from San Francisco to Palmdale and from Burbank to Los Angeles were already environmentally cleared. The last two segments in Phase 1, Palmdale to Burbank and Los Angeles to Anaheim, are both now expected to be approved before 2026. The goal was to have all segments in Phase 1 ready for construction when funding became available.
4. Continuing to advance "bookend" investments. In Northern California, these include electrification of Caltrain, grade separations, and an automatic train control system between San Francisco and San Jose. The Authority will also be working with Union Pacific Railroad to extend electrification to Gilroy, since the selected "blended" route between San Jose and Gilroy uses the UPRR alignment. In Southern California, these include phase A of Link Union Station, which through-tracks LA Union Station, and other improvements, such as early grade separations in the Burbank-to-Los Angeles shared corridor, the Rosecrans–Marquardt grade separation, and an automatic train control system. These investments will provide immediate benefits in the San Francisco and Los Angeles areas, while also readying those transit systems for eventual shared use by HSR trainsets. (The 28 red stars in the map shown here indicate bookend investments in other rail systems.)
5. Opening the Interim IOS to passenger traffic before 2031. SB 198 (passed by the legislature and signed into law in June 2022) prioritized getting the Interim IOS into operation. The contracted early train operator (ETO) selected to run the system is DB ECO North America Inc. The plan is to have the Interim IOS run double-tracked from Merced to Bakersfield, have five stations (Merced, Madera, Fresno, Kings/Tulare, and Bakersfield), provide many more trips per day than current service, and operate the trains up to 220 miles per hour (350 km/h) for a significantly faster service. The Merced station will provide a transfer point to the Altamont Corridor Express (ACE) and Gold Runner (Amtrak) rail routes to Sacramento and the Bay Area (San Francisco, Oakland, and San Jose) as well as local buses. The Bakersfield station will have a transfer to Thruway Bus Service for travel to Southern California.

Also, a major addition to the development and operation plan was a new emphasis on risk analysis and risk mitigation (with these integrated into the formal authorization process), and contingency reserves were being increased. Revenue and expense projections indicated that constructing an operable 171-mile (275 km) segment is feasible.

==== Critique of 2023 Project Update Report ====
On March 23, 2023, the Peer Review Group sent a Letter to the Legislature (March 23, 2023) reviewing the 2023 Project Update Report. In particular, the group noted the following major problems:

1. increasing costs (while not out of line) would continue to pose significant problems
2. "schedules continued to stretch out" and "There was no longer a projected completion date for the full Phase I system because there was no funding on which to base a credible schedule"
3. ridership demand estimates had fallen, thus reducing the benefits of the system
4. confidence forecasts may have easily been wrong because perhaps the most difficult forecasts (tunneling and electrification) had no real-world data to back them up
5. inflation would continue to be a significant cost-increasing factor
6. meeting local requests for modifications might have added significant cost increases (as had already happened)
7. the Memorandum of Understanding between California State Transportation Agency (CalSTA), the Authority, and the San Joaquin Joint Powers Authority was a good start but did not properly cover funding issues
8. the anticipated piecemeal federal money infusion was not a reliable or adequate funding process to base the project on
9. the unfunded gap between known revenue and projected expenses was increasing
10. the increasingly acute dilemma of putting the Merced to Bakersfield section into service may not have been worth it, since only the entire Phase 1 system may have delivered adequate returns on investment, and yet due to the apparently increasingly large funding gap of doing so, the state may have not been able to fully fund its implementation (It should be noted, however, that the costs and benefits of implementing the mid-position of the SF to Bakersfield section was not discussed.)

These are all significant concerns, and there are no ready answers for them all. Ultimately, it is up to the legislature to determine what it wants to do with the system.

The letter goes on to list 9 "considerations for the legislature", including the appointment of an inspector general (IG) [which has since been done], a caution that "It is critical that any funding approach be fully funded and stable and predictable from year to year" in a project of this magnitude and complexity, a review of potential cost-cutting measures in the Merced to Bakersfield section, and a review of the Authority's staffing and organizational structure keeping in mind forthcoming operational demands.

The next Business Plan will be released in draft form in early 2024, and it will give the latest status and projections on the project.

== Financial history ==
As of February 2022, $9.0 billion in funding had been spent, $2.7 billion of available funding remained, and at least a further $9.5 billion was estimated to be authorized. The total funding authorized for the project included:

- $3.5 billion in federal funds.
- $8.6 billion in Proposition 1A funds.
- $9.6-13.2 billion in total estimated Cap and Trade funds.

In July 2022, the remaining $4.2 billion in Proposition 1A funds were released to the authority.

In January 2024, the Authority released the Updated Total Authorized Spending Request for a total of $26.094 billion. Actual expenditures as of November 2023 totaled $11.554 billion. Revenue assumptions at that time totaled $35.2 billion.

=== Costs ===
The cost of the San Francisco-to-Anaheim route was originally estimated in 2008 at $33 billion (in 2006 dollars; would be about $65 billion in year-of-expenditure (YOE) dollars). Upon further investigation, however, the Authority determined that a route using exclusive trackage along its entire length would be extremely expensive (estimated at over $96 billion in 2012 dollars), so they saw a need to share track in the metropolitan areas of the San Francisco Peninsula and the LA Basin. Thus, their perspective changed from a stand-alone High Speed Rail (HSR) system to one where HSR would share commuter rails (a "blended" system) to both save money and improve all passenger rail needs. (Note that the 2012 Revised Business Plan listed a new estimate for a Full Build option for a cumulative cost of $91.4 billion (2012 YOE) and completion date of 2033.)

The Revised 2012 Business Plan listed new estimates (in cumulative year-of-expenditure costs) for the new blended system: Initial Operating System in 2021 for a total of $31.3 billion, Bay to Basin in 2026 for a total of $51.2 billion, and Phase 1 Blended in 2028 for a total of $68.4 billion.

==== Phase 1 ====
Estimates for both time and costs have been steadily changing over the course of the project. The following table lists the cost estimates obtained from the California High Speed Rail Authority's business plans for the Phase 1 "Full" and "Blended" builds from San Francisco to Los Angeles. Note that the Authority realized early on that a "Full" system would financially infeasible, and so switched to the "Blended" plan.

Source	Phase 1 Full			Phase 1 Blended				
Source	Current Year $ (billions)	YOE $ (billions)	2025 Year $ (billions)	Current Year $ (billions)	YOE $ (billions)			2025 Year $ (billions)
Source	Current Year $ (billions)	YOE $ (billions)	2025 Year $ (billions)	Current Year $ (billions)	Low	Base	High	2025 Year $ (billions)
2000 Business Plan	25.0 (1999$)		48.3					
2005 EIR/EIS	33-37 (2003$)		57.8~64.8					
2008 Prop 1A voter guide	45 (2006$)		71.9					
2008 Business Plan	33.6 (2008$)		50.2					
2009 Report to the Legislature Fact Sheet	34.9 (2008$)	42.6	52.2					
2009 Report to the Legislature Full Report	35.7 (2009$)	42.6	53.6					
Draft 2012 Business Plan p.ES-9	65.4 (2010$)	98.1	96.6	54.9 (2010$)		78.2		81.1
Draft 2012 Business Plan pp. 1–3	65.0 (2010$)	98.5	96					
2012 Business Plan				53.4 (2011$)		68.4		76.4
2014 Business Plan				54.9 (2013$)		67.6		75.9
2016 Business Plan				55.3 (2015$)		64.2		75.1
2018 Business Plan				67.5 (2017$)	63.3	77.3	98.1	88.6
2019 Report to the Legislature					63.2	79.1	98.1	
Draft 2020 Business Plan				71.9 (2019$)	63.3	80.3	98.1	90.6
Revised Draft 2020 Business Plan					69.1	82.4~83.8	99.9	
Draft 2022 Business Plan					72.3	86.7~88.2	105.1	
2022 Business Plan					76.7	92.8~94.2	113.2	
2023 Project Update Report					88.5	106.2	127.9	
2024 Draft Business Plan					88.5	106.2	127.9	
2024 Revised Draft Business Plan					88.5	106.2	127.9	
2026 Draft Business Plan				231.3 (2026$)				231.3 (2026$)

In 2026, the Authority used methods from bottom-up cost estimating to re-estimate the full Phase 1 (blended) buildout, and found additional opportunities to reduce the cost to build a profitable High Speed Rail service, such as by reducing tunneling between Palmdale and Burbank. As of 2026, they informally call this the Optimized plan.

Source	Full Phase 1 (Blended)	Optimized Phase 1
Source	Current Year $ (billions)	YOE $ (billions)
2026 Draft Business Plan	231.3 (2026$)	126.2

==== Intermin Operating System / Early Operating System (EOS) ====
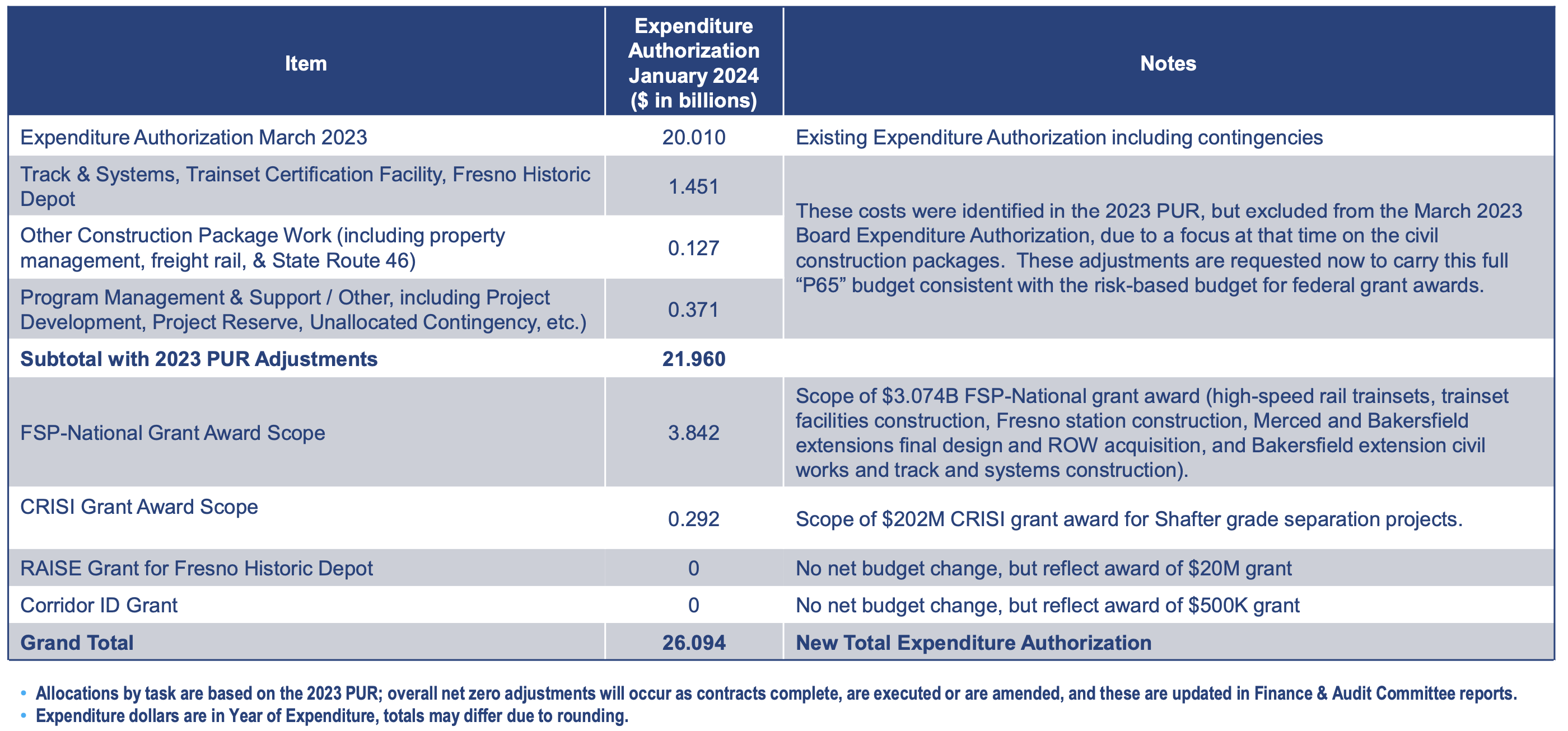
In January 2024, the Authority updated its authorized expenditures. The following table shows the current expenditure authorization (which includes more than the IOS):

=== Funding ===
Funding for the project comes from a variety of sources:

- Proposition 1A bonds
- California Cap-and-Trade funds (authorized through 2030)
- Local funds (from a variety of sources)
- Federal funds (from a variety of sources)

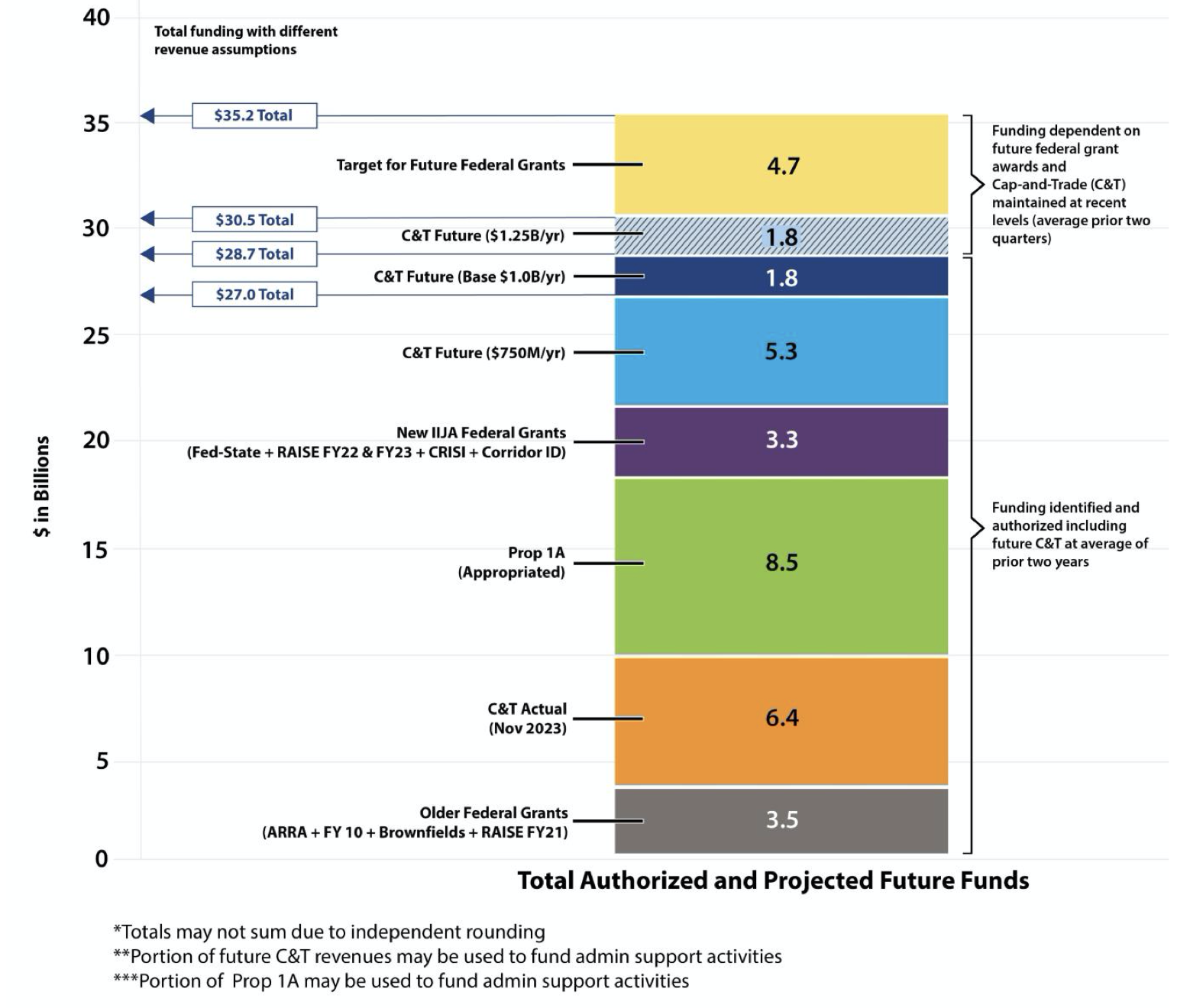
As of January 2024, the projection of funding is given in the draft 2024 Business Plan, detailed in Chapter 3.

==== Proposition 1A Bond funds ====
On November 4, 2008, California voters approved Proposition 1A, a measure to construct the initial segment of the network. The measure authorized $9 billion in bond sales for the construction of the core segment between San Francisco and Los Angeles/Anaheim, and an additional $950 million for improvements on local railroad systems, which will serve as feeder systems to the planned high-speed rail system.

==== Federal funds ====
On October 2, 2009, Governor Arnold Schwarzenegger unveiled California's official application for ARRA (the American Recovery and Reinvestment Act of 2009) high-speed rail stimulus funding. The total amount of the application was $4.7 billion, representing more than half of the federal $8 billion allocated for high-speed rail. On January 28, 2010, the White House announced that California would receive $2.35 billion of its request, of which $2.25 billion was allocated specifically for California High Speed Rail, while the rest was designated for conventional rail improvements. On October 28, 2010, the federal government awarded the Authority a further $900 million for passenger rail improvements, including $715 million specifically for the high-speed rail project, but with the requirement that it be used for the Central Valley segments from Merced to Fresno, or Fresno-to-Bakersfield. On December 9, 2010, the federal Department of Transportation reallocated $1.2 billion in high-speed rail funding from states that had rejected it. Of this, $624 million was redirected to the Authority for use on the Initial Construction Section. On May 9, 2011, the federal Department of Transportation reallocated an additional $2 billion in federal high-speed rail funding from Florida, which had rejected it. The DOT awarded $300 million to the Authority for a 20-mile (32 km) extension from Madera north to the Chowchilla Wye.

==== Beginning construction funding ====
On July 6, 2012, the California legislature approved construction of high-speed system, and Governor Brown signed the bill on July 18. The funding approved includes $4.5 billion in bonds previously approved by voters, which, in turn, freed up $3.2 billion in federal funding that would otherwise have expired after July 6. $2.6 billion was allocated to build the Initial Construction Segment. Funding was also to be used for several "bookend" and connectivity projects designed to integrate the future high-speed rail system with existing local and regional rail lines. The plan estimates final cost at Year-Of-Expenditure (YOE) $68 billion for Phase 1.

==== Cap-and-Trade funds ====
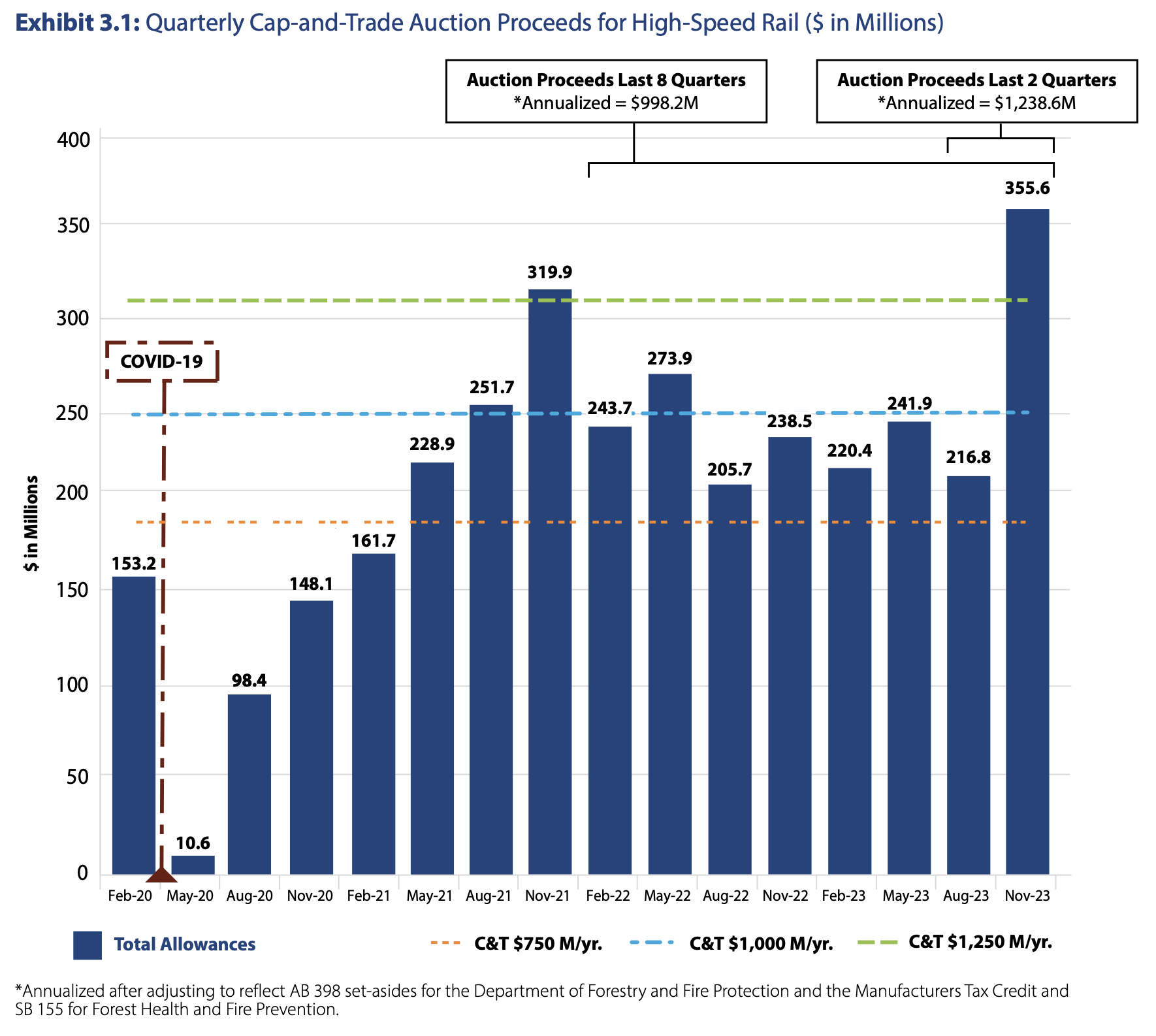
History of Cap-and-Trade auctions per draft 2024 Business Plan

In June 2014 state legislators and Governor Jerry Brown agreed on apportioning the state's annual cap-and-trade funds (through 2030) so that 25% goes to high speed rail (under the control of the Authority) and 15% goes to other transportation projects by other agencies. As of September 2022, the project has received a total of $5,108,206,000 in cap-and-trade funding.

==== Future funding ====
In May 2022, CHSRA applied for nearly $1.3 billion in federal funding from the 2021 Bipartisan Infrastructure Law as part of a multi-year plan to pursue additional federal funding. If awarded the funds, the authority plans to use them to pursue the following goals:

- Constructing the second track for the initial operating segment between Merced and Bakersfield, beginning with the two tracks on the first 119 miles currently being built in the Central Valley.
- Advancing design work for the extensions to Merced and Bakersfield.
- Station development in Fresno and Kings/Tulare.
- Purchasing six fully electric train sets capable of speeds in excess of 200 mph.
- Advancing the next phase of design for two segments into the Bay Area (Merced to San Jose and San Jose to San Francisco) and into Southern California (Bakersfield to Palmdale and Burbank to Los Angeles).

In August 2022, the authority received a $25 million RAISE grant for advancing design work for the extension to Merced. The authority had applied for this grant prior to submitting its Multimodal Project Discretionary Grant applications in May 2022.

In addition, the authority is pursuing further funding opportunities in 2022, such as the Railroad Crossing Elimination Program, Consolidated Rail Infrastructure and Safety Improvement grants, and Federal-State Partnership grants.

==== Private sector interest ====
In mid-2015 the CHSRA put out a request for Expressions of Interest from the private sector in financing, constructing, and operating the California HSR system. On Sept. 30, 2015 they released the names of 30 major and international firms who expressed interest in doing so. They were from all around the world, including major players in large construction projects, high-speed rail manufacturers, and HSR system operators. Europe, China, and Japan were represented. However, no private investment has occurred.

== Legal challenges ==
=== John Tos et al. (Proposition 1A compliance) ===
The lawsuit John Tos, Aaron Fukuda, and the Kings County Board of Supervisors v. California High-Speed Rail Authority was first filed in late 2011. On November 25, 2013 Sacramento County Superior Court Judge Michael Kenny issued two rulings in this lawsuit concerning the release of funding from the passage of Proposition 1A. First, the state did not have a valid financing plan, and he ordered the Authority to rescind its business plan and create a new one. Second, he also ruled that the state had not properly approved the sale of bonds to finance the project. The Brown administration sought an expedited appellate court hearing, but that was denied. However, on July 31, 2014, the 3rd District Court of Appeals three-judge panel reversed the lower court ruling and ordered Judge Kenney to vacate his decision. The final ruling was that the requirements for the financing plan, environmental clearances, and construction plans did not need to be secured for the entire project before construction began, but only for each construction segment. Finally, in October 2014, the state Supreme Court refused to hear an appeal of this decision.

However, Judge Kenny split the aforementioned case into two parts, and the second part was continued to Feb. 11, 2016. The issues to be decided concerned other Proposition 1A legal requirements: (1) Can the train travel from Los Angeles (Union Station) to San Francisco (Transbay Terminal) in two hours and 40 minutes? (2) Will the train require an operational subsidy? (3) Does the new "blended system" approach meet the definition of high-speed rail in Proposition 1A? On Mar. 8, 2016 Judge Kenny ruled the issues raised were "not ripe for review". The plaintiffs raised compelling questions, but the Authority hasn't yet submitted its funding plan, and the project is still too much in flux. Thus, this case was ended, however, there is a possibility of further action on these issues in the future.

Also, on June 5, 2015, the Kings County Grand Jury released a report critical of the Kings County Board of Supervisors in pursuing this lawsuit. Three specific objections were noted: (1) no public hearings were held before litigation was started so public sentiment was not obtained, (2) grants that would have benefited the public were denied because the Board did not want to show any support for the HSR project, and (3) no county land would be affected by the project (except for road crossings), so the county was pursuing this suit for the benefit of individual property owners and not the public.

In November 2021 a state appeals court rejected the Tos lawsuit, effectively ending the litigation. Plaintiffs have little interest in appealing the issue to the state Supreme Court.

=== Other problems and lawsuits ===
The lawsuit Kings County, Kern County, the First Free Will Baptist Church of Bakersfield, Dignity Health in Bakersfield, and the City of Shafter v. California High-Speed Rail Authority concerned the environmental certification and route selection of the Fresno to Bakersfield segment.

In TRANSDEF (Transportation Solutions Defense and Education Fund) v. the California Air Resources Board, the Authority was named as an affected party because it is the beneficiary of cap-and-trade fund allocations that were being challenged in the suit.

In Kings County, the Kings County Farm Bureau, Citizens for California High-Speed Rail Accountability, the Bay Area-based Community Coalition on High-Speed Rail, California Rail Foundation and TRANSDEF v. Surface Transportation Board, the litigants were challenging in the federal Ninth Circuit Court a ruling made in 2014 by the Surface Transportation Board that federal environmental laws trump state environmental laws. The Authority intervened in this suit since a result would have directly affected it.

Friends of Eel River vs. North Coast Railroad Authority was a lawsuit held before the California Supreme Court, and was similar to the Surface Transportation Board suit regarding the federal decision trumping the California Environmental Quality Act. Two state appellate courts have issued conflicting decisions on this issue. The Authority filed a friend of the court brief.

In December 2011, Legislative Analyst's Office published a report indicating that the incremental development path outlined by CHSRA may not be legal. According to the State Analyst, "Proposition 1A identifies certain requirements that must be met prior to requesting an appropriation of bond proceeds for construction. These include identifying for a corridor, or a usable segment thereof, all sources of committed funds, the anticipated time of receipt of those funds, and completing all project-level environmental clearances for that segment. Our review finds that the funding plan only identifies committed funding for the ICS (San Joaquin Valley segment), which is not a usable segment, and therefore does not meet the requirements of Proposition 1A. In addition, the HSRA has not yet completed all environmental clearances for any usable segment and will not likely receive all of these approvals prior to the expected 2012 date of initiating construction." However, initial concerns regarding the project's legality were resolved.

In November 2021, the Third District Court of Appeal in Sacramento affirmed a 2018 lower court ruling that the project's incremental development path did not violate the California Constitution.

==== "Dam Train" ====
In May 2015, Fresno City Councilman Steve Brandau used $3,000 of his campaign funds to put up billboards along state route 99 proposing that some of the rail funding be used to provide more water to farmers, such as the construction of the Temperance Flat Dam. The words "Dam" and "Train" appear in large bold letters on the billboards.

While some officials agreed with Brandau, others like Fresno County Supervisor Henry Perea said they need both water and transportation.

== Acquisition of trains ==
In January 2015, the Authority issued a request for proposal (RFP) for complete trainsets. In February 2015, ten companies formally expressed interest in producing trainsets for the system: Alstom, AnsaldoBreda (now Hitachi Rail Italy), Bombardier Transportation, CSR, Hyundai Rotem, Kawasaki Rail Car, Siemens, Sun Group U.S.A. partnered with CNR Tangshan, and Talgo.

Due to company acquisitions and mergers since then (CSR merged with CNR, and Bombardier Transportation merged with Alstom), the number of companies qualified for the tender was reduced to seven. The qualified companies were Alstom, Siemens Mobility, Talgo, Hitachi Rail Italy, CRRC, Hyundai Rotem, and Kawasaki Rail Car.

An additional factor for the selection of a model is the Buy America regulation for production of rolling stock in the US. The Federal Railroad Administration granted a waiver for two prototypes to be manufactured off-shore. The remaining trainsets would need to be built according to the rules. This requirement was mentioned as a significant reason that Chinese manufacturers dropped out of the Brightline West (then known as XpressWest) project with similar technical trainset specifications.

However, there were no funds readily available for train purchase at the time, so no action was taken then. In May 2022 a grant request was submitted to the Biden administration for funds to purchase six HSR trainsets. The 2023 Project Update Report projects the purchase of these to be made in 2024. In August 2023 the new process for trainset purchase was revealed, with a new request for qualifications (RFQ) and a new request for proposals (RFP). The RFQ has been adopted, and is in process now; the new RFQ will be sent to accepted bidders early in 2024. An early delivery of a trainset for testing purposes is anticipated for 2028, with delivery of the remaining ones by 2030.

The 2023 Project Update Report states that for the entire Phase 1 system 66 trainsets will be needed.

== Public opinion ==
In the early 2000s there was a significant debate in the press regarding the proposed HSR system.

=== Pro and con in the press ===
In 2008 the Reason Foundation, the Howard Jarvis Taxpayers Association, and Citizens Against Government Waste, published a study which they named the "Due Diligence Report" critiquing the project. In 2013, the Reason Foundation published an "Updated Due Diligence Report". The Reason Foundation is libertarian, the Howard Jarvis Taxpayers Association is officially non-partisan but lobbies against raising taxes, and Citizens Against Government Waste functions as a 'government watchdog' and advocacy group for fiscally conservative causes.

Key elements of the original critique include operating train speed higher than any existing HSR system at the time, unrealistic ridership and fare projections, increasing costs, no clear funding plan, and incorrect assumptions regarding HSR alternatives.

In the updated 2013 critique, another type of criticism was leveled at the proposed HSR system when the idea of using a "blended" system with Caltrain was adopted by the Authority. It was felt by some that this idea did not meet the original Proposition 1A plan due to the resulting lower operating speeds, fewer trips, and fewer riders. (The blended system is commonly used in Europe for its advantages of substantial cost savings, reduced land requirements, and better passenger convenience.)

James Fallows in a series of 18 largely supportive articles in The Atlantic magazine summarized public criticism thus, "It will cost too much, take too long, use up too much land, go to the wrong places, and in the end won't be fast or convenient enough to do that much good anyway."

As noted in James Fallows' third article (in 2014) in his series on California's High-Speed Rail project, the Authority was seen as not very effective and possibly even mismanaging the project. Dan Richard, the new Authority chair appointed by Gov. Brown, made this comment for inclusion in his article concerning this charge:

When Jerry Brown came in (in his third term as governor), the HSR program was rife with problems. The organization was at half-strength, the board was dysfunctional, there was a high level of criticism from independent groups evaluating ridership and plans.

All of that has turned around. The board is highly cohesive and professional. The staff is now at full strength with a highly capable day-to-day CEO, top flight engineering, risk management and program leadership. We have the most sophisticated risk management program likely to be found in any public infrastructure program. Our cost data and risk assessments are now presented publicly on a regular basis at our board meetings and are in accessible form on our website. Our CEO put in excellent local project leaders and former critics have lauded the openness and responsiveness of that team.

The Peer Review largely concurs with his opinion. Here's a quote from the Independent Peer Review Group:

"We believe that the Authority has made manifest progress in all areas of planning and management since the Revised 2012 Business Plan. This assessment applies to risk management, demand forecasting, operating and maintenance (O&M) cost modeling and the analysis of the impact of HSR on California's greenhouse gas emissions."

In 2022, the New York Times printed an article which stated that SNCF, the French national railroad, offered to help California build the high speed rail, but California rejected the offer. The article said, "the design for the nation’s most ambitious infrastructure project was never based on the easiest or most direct route. Instead, the train’s path out of Los Angeles was diverted across a second mountain range to the rapidly growing suburbs of the Mojave Desert." It also opined (without proof) that this route was politically motivated to appease a powerful Los Angeles County politician, and did not mention other reasons for the chosen route.

==== Proposals for alternative technologies ====
Elon Musk proposed what he termed Hyperloop as an alternative to CAHSR. He described this system in 2013, and he and his company SpaceX promoted it as both less costly to construct and significantly quicker than a conventional high-speed rail system, although these claims were unsubstantiated. Musk's proposal was to use a system of vacuum-sealed tubes to contain its cars, which would run at a higher speed than HSR. One reason why it would be cheaper was because its route would follow the shorter Interstate 5 corridor from the Los Angeles terminus to the San Francisco Bay Area terminus. In correspondence with biographer Ashlee Vance, Musk revealed that his intention behind the Hyperloop proposal was to "show people that more creative solutions were out there," and that down the road, he may "fund or advise on a Hyperloop project," but had never intended to build it, citing his role as CEO of SpaceX and Tesla as a constraining factor. Musk's words to Vance have been criticized by Canadian technology writer Paris Marx as revealing his intention to halt a transition away from automobiles. Musk's Hyperloop One never got out of the prototype stage and the company was shut down in December 2023.

In addition to Hyperloop, magnetic levitation (maglev) trains have been proposed. These technologies have been under discussion and development for decades, although actual realization has been lagging. These hold theoretical advantages, but would cost as much (or more) than conventional HSR technology to build. They would also have the same issues as CAHSR in acquiring right-of-way.

=== Public approval ===
Public approval for CAHSR has remained steady over the years:

In April 2022, UC Berkeley's Institute of Government Studies released a survey of registered voters that found 56% supported continuing the high-speed rail project even if "its operations only extend from Bakersfield to Merced in the Central Valley by the year 2030 and to the Bay Area by the year 2033." Approval varies by political affiliation with 73% of Democrats backing the project versus 25% of Republicans.

An older statewide survey, in March 2016, by the Public Policy Institute of California (PPIC) indicated that 52% of Californians support the project, while 63% of Californians think the project is either "very important" or "somewhat important" for California's economy and quality of life. Support varies by location (with the San Francisco Bay Area the highest at 63%, and lowest in Orange/San Diego at 47%), by race (Asians 66%, Latinos 58%, Whites 44%, and Blacks 42%), by age (declining sharply with increasing age), and by political orientation (Democrats 59%, independents 47%, and Republicans 29%). Dan Richard, then-chair of the authority, said in an interview with James Fallows that he believes approval levels will increase when people can start seeing progress, and trains start running.

In 2008, voters approved Proposition 1A with 52.6%.
