= Fort Miller, California =

Fort Miller
- Ghost town
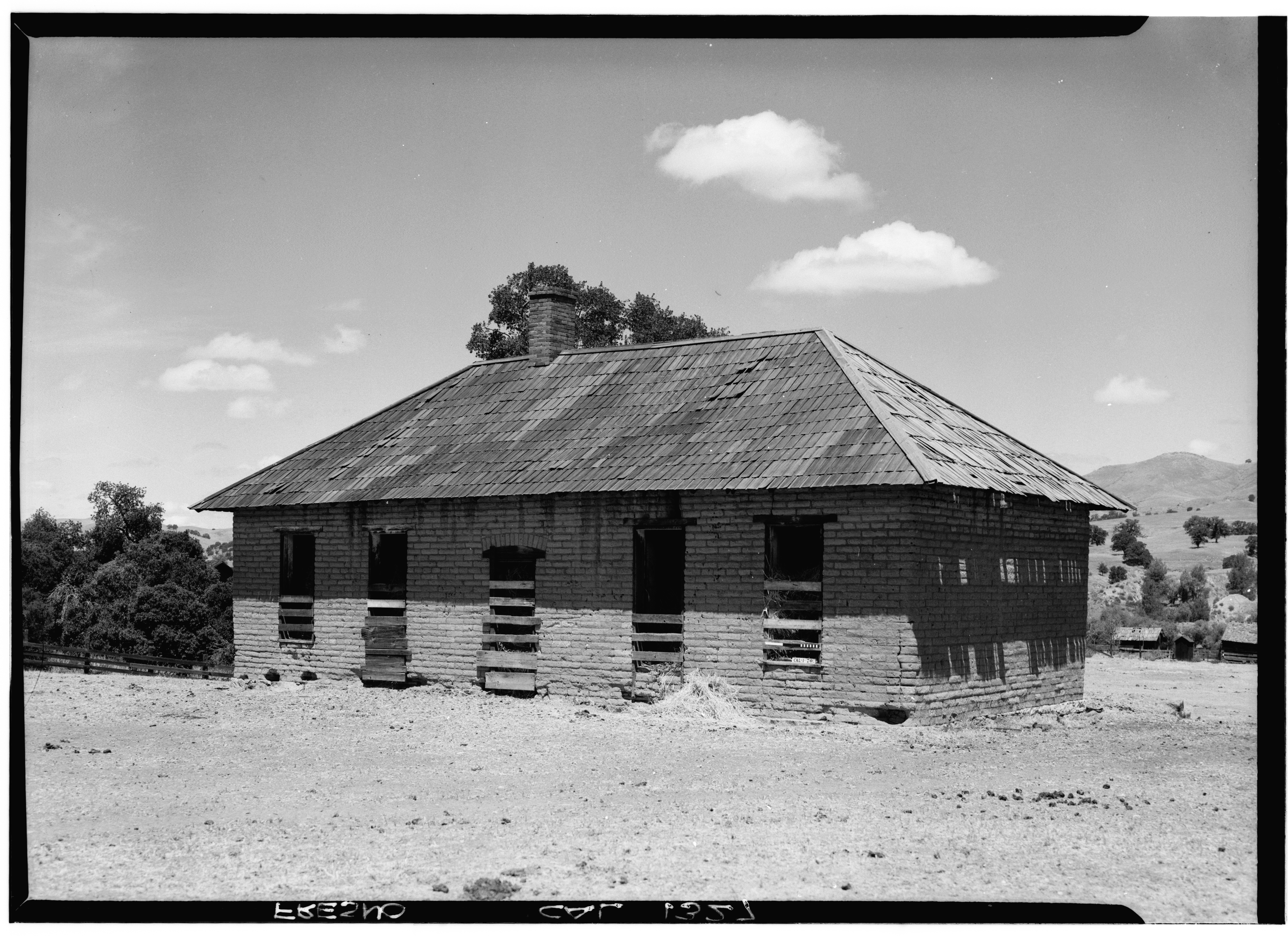
- Fort Miller Hospital, c. 1935

- Location in California
- Coordinates: 37°0′54.82″N 119°39′33.51″W
- Country: United States
- State: California
- County: Madera
- Fort Miller: 1852
- Elevation: 561 ft (171 m)

California Historical Landmark
- Reference no.: 584

Fort Miller, also known as Camp Barbour, was a fort on the south bank of the San Joaquin River in what is now Fresno County, California, United States. It lay at an elevation of 561 feet (171 m). The site is now under Millerton Lake, formed by the Friant Dam in 1944. It is registered as California Historical Landmark #584.

== History ==
Fort Miller location and nearby features
1 Abandoned Fort Miller settlement
2 Abandoned Millerton settlement
3 Friant Dam
4 Millerton (modern Census Designated Place)
5 Table Mountain Rancheria

In early 1851, a temporary outpost was built along the banks of the San Joaquin River and named Camp Barbour, after the George W. Barbour, the California indian commissioner. It was here that federal indian commissioners negotiated and signed a treaty with many California tribes in the area on April 29, 1851. The treaty established the Fresno River Reservation on which the tribes would live. The refusal of the Ahwahneechee and Chowchilla tribes to sign the treaty and relocate to the reservation led to the Mariposa War.

To supervise the newly established reservation and protect the booming mining activity on the San Joaquin River, it became clear that a permanent fort was needed. Once the Camp Barbour outpost was converted to a permanent fort and made operational by Lieutenant Tredwell Moore of the U. S. Army, it was renamed Fort Miller, named after Major Albert S. Miller.

Fort Miller was constructed on one of the widest reaches of the San Joaquin River, above the river's navigable portion. The fort had easy access to the local mining camps. However, the surrounding foothills caused intense summer heat. The fort consisted of a blockhouse, barracks, officers quarters, mess hall and other buildings. A hospital was completed in 1853.

Hostilities with the local tribes had receded by 1858 and the fort was evacuated of military personnel but left with all the buildings intact. It was given to a local caretaker for maintenance.

Upon the outbreak of the American Civil War, an informant reported that nearby townspeople had "celebrated the occasion by a public demonstration, in which all joined (of both sexes), by firing a Confederate salute...cheering for them and groaning for the United States government and its officers." Soldiers were sent back to Fort Miller in 1863 to investigate the situation, but found no such trouble with confederate sympathizers.

The Army again abandoned the post on December 1, 1864, and auctioned off the buildings in 1866. The property itself, with a few of the structures intact, became Judge Charles A. Hart's Fort Miller Ranch. William H. McKenzie later bought the ranch.

The buildings stood until they were demolished to make way for the Friant Dam and Millerton Lake in 1944. The Fort Miller blockhouse was dismantled and displayed for a time in Fresno's Roeding Park. It was dismantled again and given to the Table Mountain Rancheria tribe.

== Impact ==
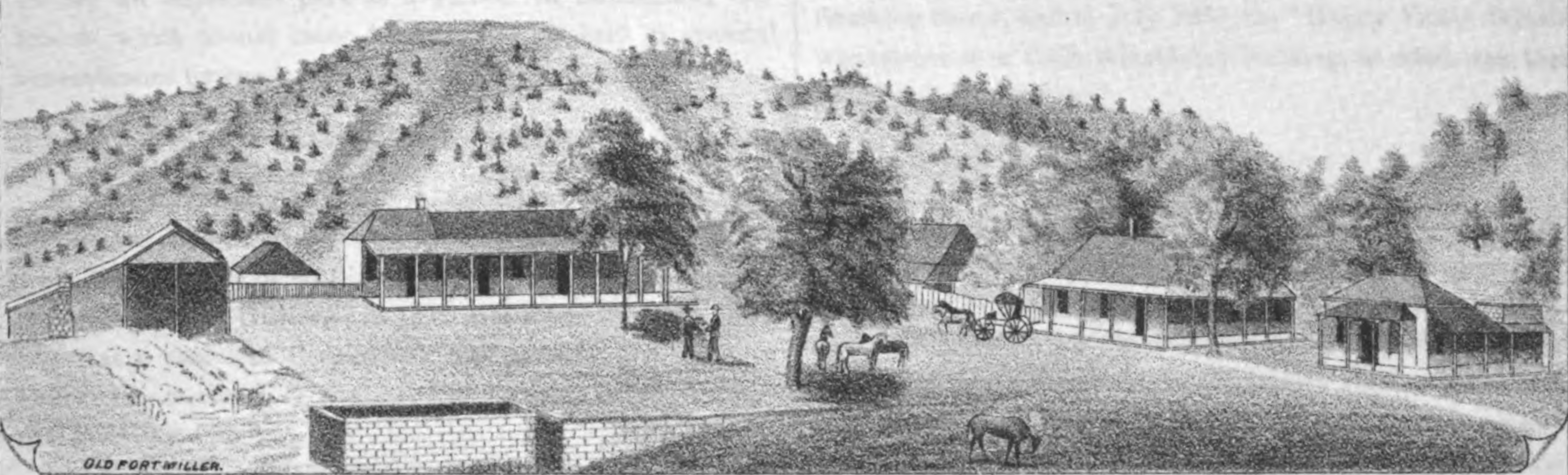
Fort Miller as it appeared in an engraving in the 1882 History of Fresno. It was then part of the Judge Hart ranch.

Fort Miller lent its name to the civilian settlement which grew up west of it. The settlement was originally named Rootville but changed to Millerton and it served as the first county seat for Fresno county. The settlement was abandoned but the name remains in the form of Lake Millerton. The Fresno Unified School District named a middle school after Fort Miller.

Fort Miller is listed as a California Historical Landmark. It was added as landmark #584 on May 22, 1957. It is also listed on the Fresno County register of historic places. The Fort Miller blockhouse is considered the oldest remaining structure in Fresno County, since it was built first out of all the buildings in the fort. It is on the county register of historic places as a separate entry from the overall fort and it is also on the city of Fresno register of historic places.
