= Millerton Lake =

Reservoir in Fresno and Madera counties, California

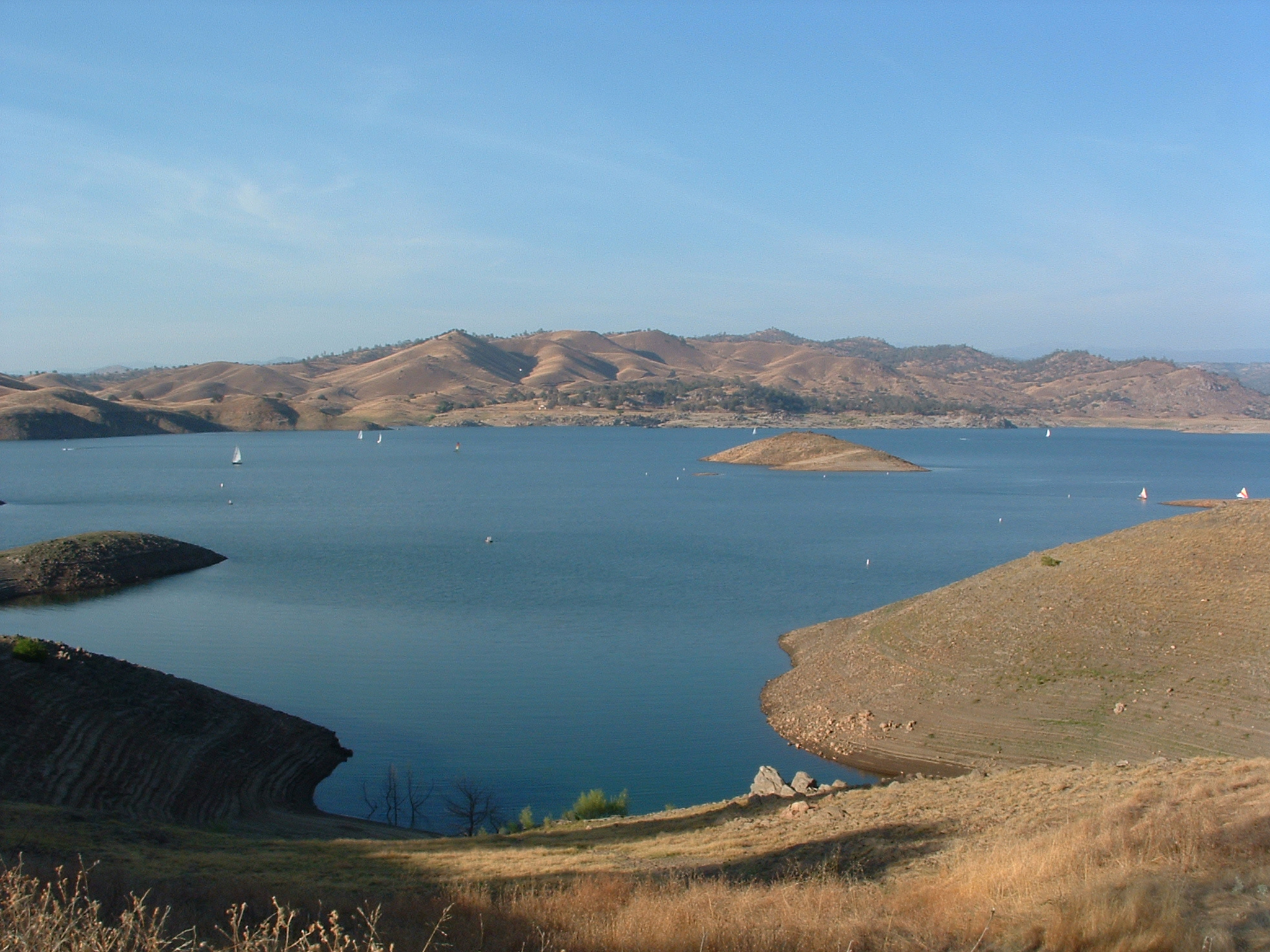

- Location within California Location within the United States
- Location: Sierra Nevada; Fresno- / Madera-Counties, California
- Coordinates: 37.0425°N 119.6545°W
- Type: Reservoir
- Primary inflows: San Joaquin River
- Primary outflows: Friant-Kern Canal; Madera Canal; San Joaquin River
- Catchment area: 1,675 sq mi (4,340 km^{2})
- Basin countries: United States
- Surface area: 4,900 acres (2,000 ha)
- Max. depth: 319 ft (97 m)
- Water volume: 520,528 acre⋅ft (0.642062 km^{3})
- Surface elevation: 561 ft (171 m)
- References: U.S. Geological Survey Geographic Names Information System: Millerton Lake

Millerton Lake is an artificial lake near the town of Friant, about 15 mi (24 km) north of downtown Fresno, California, United States. The reservoir was created by the construction of 319 ft (97 m) high Friant Dam on the San Joaquin River which, with the lake, serves as much of the county line between Fresno County to the south and Madera County to the north.

Part of the Central Valley Project, the dam was built by the United States Bureau of Reclamation (USBR) and was completed in 1942 with the exception of the drum gates being installed in 1947. The lake stores water for irrigation, which is distributed by the Madera and Friant-Kern Canals to the San Joaquin Valley. It has an instantaneous capacity of 520,528 acre⋅ft (0.642062 km^{3}).

Secondary uses include flood control and recreation, including swimming, fishing, water skiing and camping. A 25 MW hydroelectric plant operated by the Friant Power Authority produces electricity from large releases and two smaller plants use water released for a fish hatchery and to maintain minimum-flow in the river.

Prior to the construction of Friant Dam, the current lake bed was the site of the town of Millerton, the first county seat of Fresno County.

The California Office of Environmental Health Hazard Assessment has issued a safe eating advisory for fish caught in the Millerton Lake due to elevated levels of mercury.

== Environmental impacts ==
By diverting most of the San Joaquin River for irrigation, the Friant Dam has caused about 60 miles (97 km) of the river to run dry except in high water years when floodwaters are spilled from the dam. The desiccation of the river has caused the degradation of large stretches of riverside habitat and marshes, and has nearly eliminated the historic chinook salmon run that once reached about 15,000 fish each year. Reduction in flows has also increased the concentration of pesticide and fertilizer runoff in the river contributing to pollution that has further impacted aquatic species.

On September 13, 2006, after eighteen years of litigation, environmental groups, fisherman and the USBR reached an agreement on releasing part of the water currently diverted into the irrigation canals into the San Joaquin River in order to help restore the river and its native fish and wildlife. The first water was released on October 2, 2009, at a rate of 185 cubic feet per second (5.2 m^{3}/s). By 2014, these "restoration flows" were scheduled to be increased to 302,000 acre-feet (373,000 dam^{3}) per year, or 417 cubic feet per second (11.8 m^{3}/s), on top of the 117,000 acre-feet (144,000 dam^{3}) that was originally released for agricultural purposes. However, the river restoration project will cause a 12–20% reduction in irrigation water delivered from Friant Dam.

== See also ==
- List of dams and reservoirs in California
- List of lakes in California
- List of largest reservoirs of California
- Temperance Flat Dam - proposed extension of Millerton Lake
