= Rockhill =

Rockhill may refer to:

== Places ==
- Rockhill, County Limerick, Ireland
- Rockhill Barracks, County Donegal, Ireland
- East Rockhill Township, Bucks County, Pennsylvania
- West Rockhill Township, Pennsylvania
- Rockhill, Pennsylvania, a borough in Huntingdon County, Pennsylvania
- Rockhill, Texas, an unincorporated community in Collin County, Texas
- Rockhill, Shropshire, a place in Shropshire, England

== People ==
- Carson Rockhill (born 1990), Canadian football player
- Dan Rockhill, American architect
- Gabriel Rockhill (born 1972), French-American philosopher, writer, critic and activist
- James Rockhill (born 1990), British electronic music producer and DJ known as Kove
- William R. Rockhill (1793–1865), U.S. Representative from Indiana
- William Woodville Rockhill (1854–1914), American diplomat and author

== See also ==
- Rock Hill (disambiguation)
