= Millerton, Madera County, California =

Millerton Rootville
- Former settlement
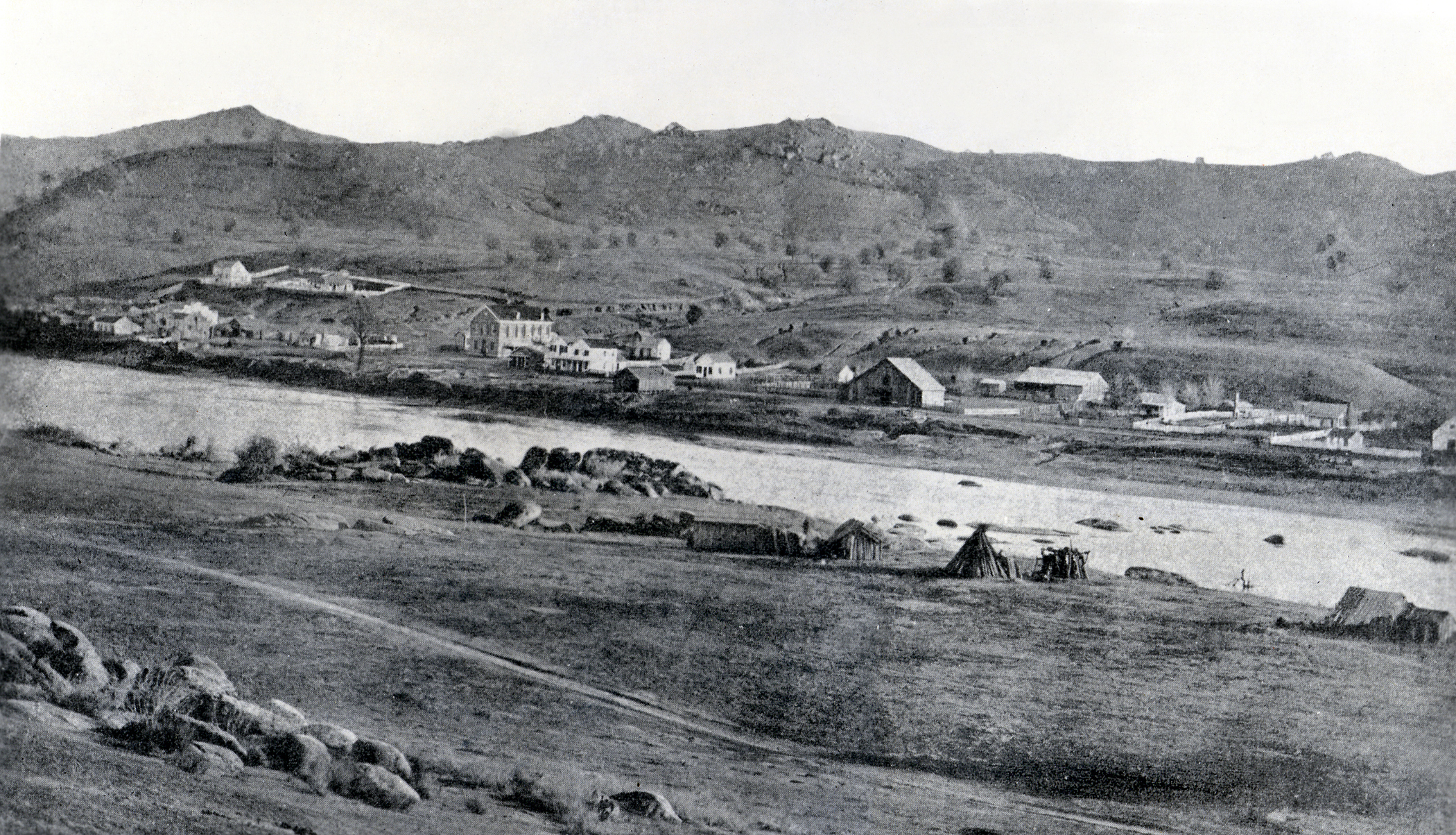
- Historic photograph showing Millerton settlement in 1870. View from right bank of the San Joaquin River.

- Location in California
- Country: United States
- State: California
- County: Madera

Millerton was a settlement located on the San Joaquin River and was the original county seat of Fresno County, California, United States. Millerton was populated from circa 1853 to the 1880s and is now inundated by the waters of Millerton Lake.

== History ==
=== Mining camp ===
As part of the California Gold Rush, placer miners explored the San Joaquin River. A man named Cassady set up a placer mining operation, near where the Temperance Flat Dam was proposed to be built, around 1851. The mine became known as Cassady's Bar. Cassady was killed by a local tribe and found on the bank of the river with his legs cut off and his tongue cut out.

Despite the hostilities, miners continued to flow to the San Joaquin River and a settlement called Rootville sprung up along the south bank of the free-flowing San Joaquin River due to the mining and trapping activity. The settlement was located along the Stockton - Los Angeles Road which allowed travelers to visit by stage and freight wagon. McCray's Ferry on the north bank of the river was the means for crossing the river at that point.

A permanent Army fort named Fort Miller was established about a mile upriver and the settlement was renamed to Millerton. It continued to grow with the prosperity of gold mining and with the protection of the Fort. A hotel was built, as well as livery stables, shops, gambling halls, and many saloons.

=== County seat ===
Millerton was named the original county seat of Fresno County, which was formed in 1856 when the county was larger than today. The county comprised its current area and all of what became Madera County and parts of what are today San Benito, Tulare, Kings, Inyo, and Mono counties. Election of county officers also took place in 1856.

In 1857, the first county-built jail structure was completed but a prisoner demonstrated it was easily escapable due to poor construction. County business was conducted in a very informal fashion, with the officers often taking breaks from their work to meet at a saloon.

The Great Flood of 1862 damaged the settlement, as well as many other places in the western states. It was rebuilt but remained within the flood zone despite hills nearby. A courthouse and new jail was erected in 1867, above the high water line. The building was made from granite sourced from a quarry a quarter of a mile away. The blocks were transported via oxen to be used in construction. The building was two stories and contained a courtroom, a jail, as well as offices for the sheriff, assessor, treasurer and clerk. The most notable structures besides the courthouse were Ira McCray's Oak Hotel, Payne's Exchange Saloon and George Greierson's General Merchandise Store.

=== Flood and decline ===
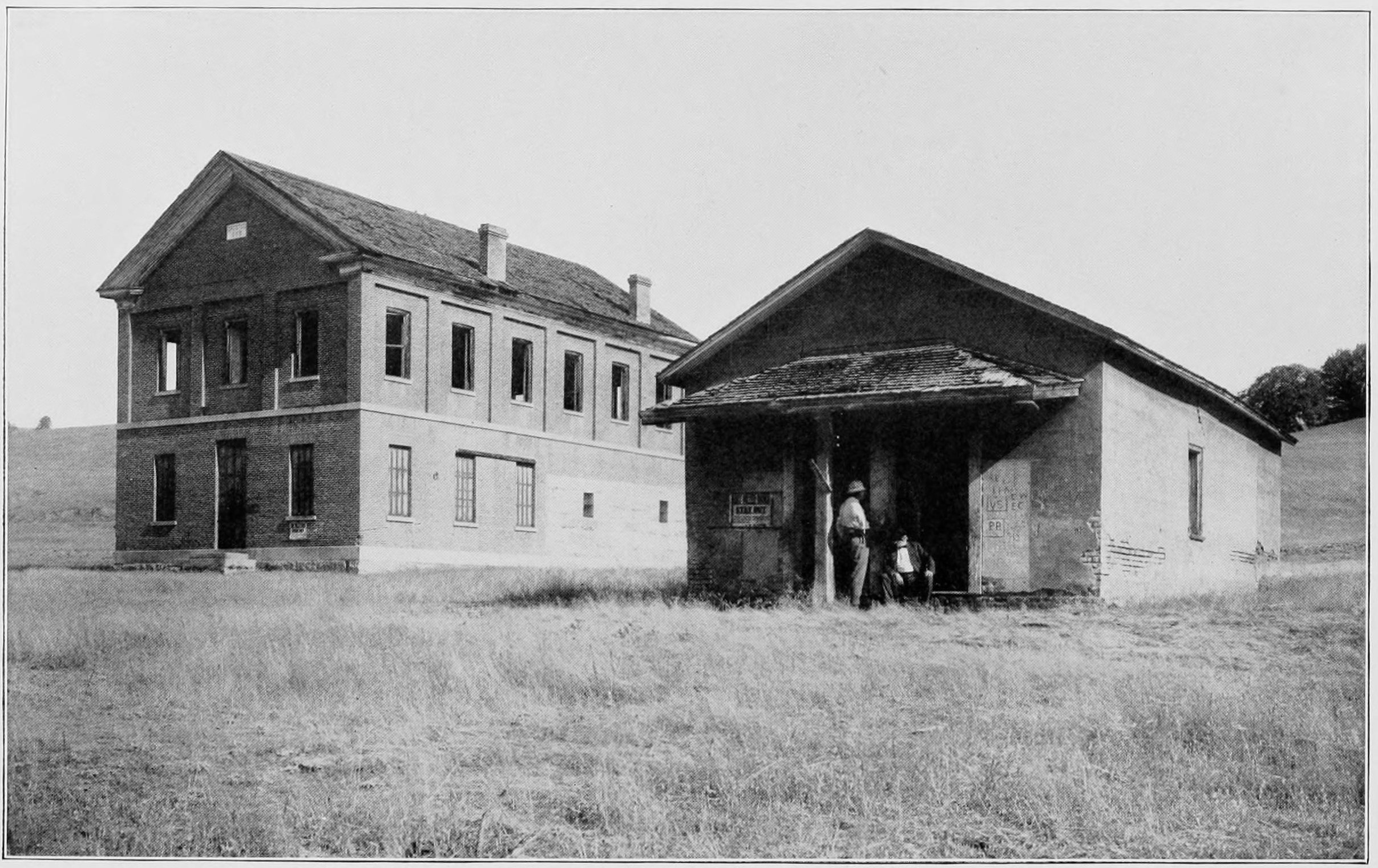
The abandoned Millerton courthouse as it stood in 1919

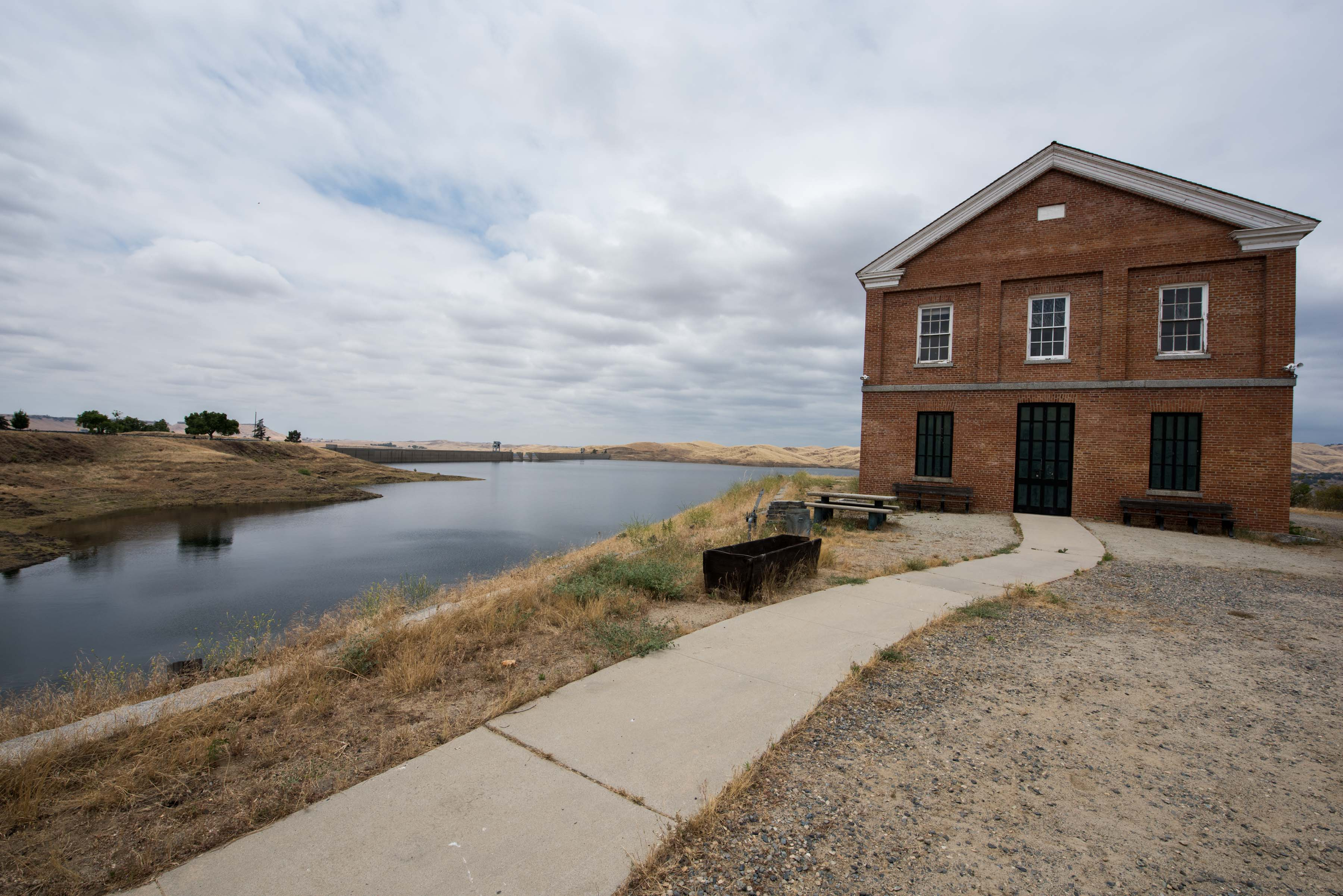
Reconstructed Millerton courthouse at the edge of Millerton Lake in 2017

The town began its decline when the San Joaquin River flooded on Christmas Eve, 1867, inundating Millerton. Women and children took refuge in the courthouse and there was no loss of life. However, three out of every four buildings were swept away and farm animals as well as household pets perished.

Some residents rebuilt, but most moved. A newspaper named the Weekly Expositor was distributed to Millerton residents starting in 1870. In July 1870, a fire broke out and destroyed the Henry Hotel in Millerton.

In 1872, the Central Pacific Railroad established a station for its new Southern Pacific line near a farm then owned by Anthony Easterby bounded by the present Chestnut, Belmont, Clovis and California avenues. Soon there was a store and around which grew the town of Fresno Station, later called Fresno. Many Millerton residents, drawn by the convenience of the railroad and worried about flooding, moved to the new community. The Expositor newspaper also moved its plant.

Two years after the station was established, in 1874, county residents voted to move the county seat from Millerton to Fresno. The vote totals were Fresno 417; Lisbon 124; Centerville 123; Millerton 93. Millerton was eventually abandoned as a result.

When the Friant Dam was completed in 1944, the site of Millerton became inundated by the waters of Millerton Lake. In extreme droughts, when the reservoir shrinks, ruins of the original county seat can still be observed.

The granite Millerton courthouse was reconstructed on higher ground in 1965 using funds raised by the Fresno County Centennial Millerton Memorial Committee and funds from the California Legislature. The reconstructed Millerton Courthouse stands on Mariners Point at the edge of Millerton Lake.
