= Friant Dam =

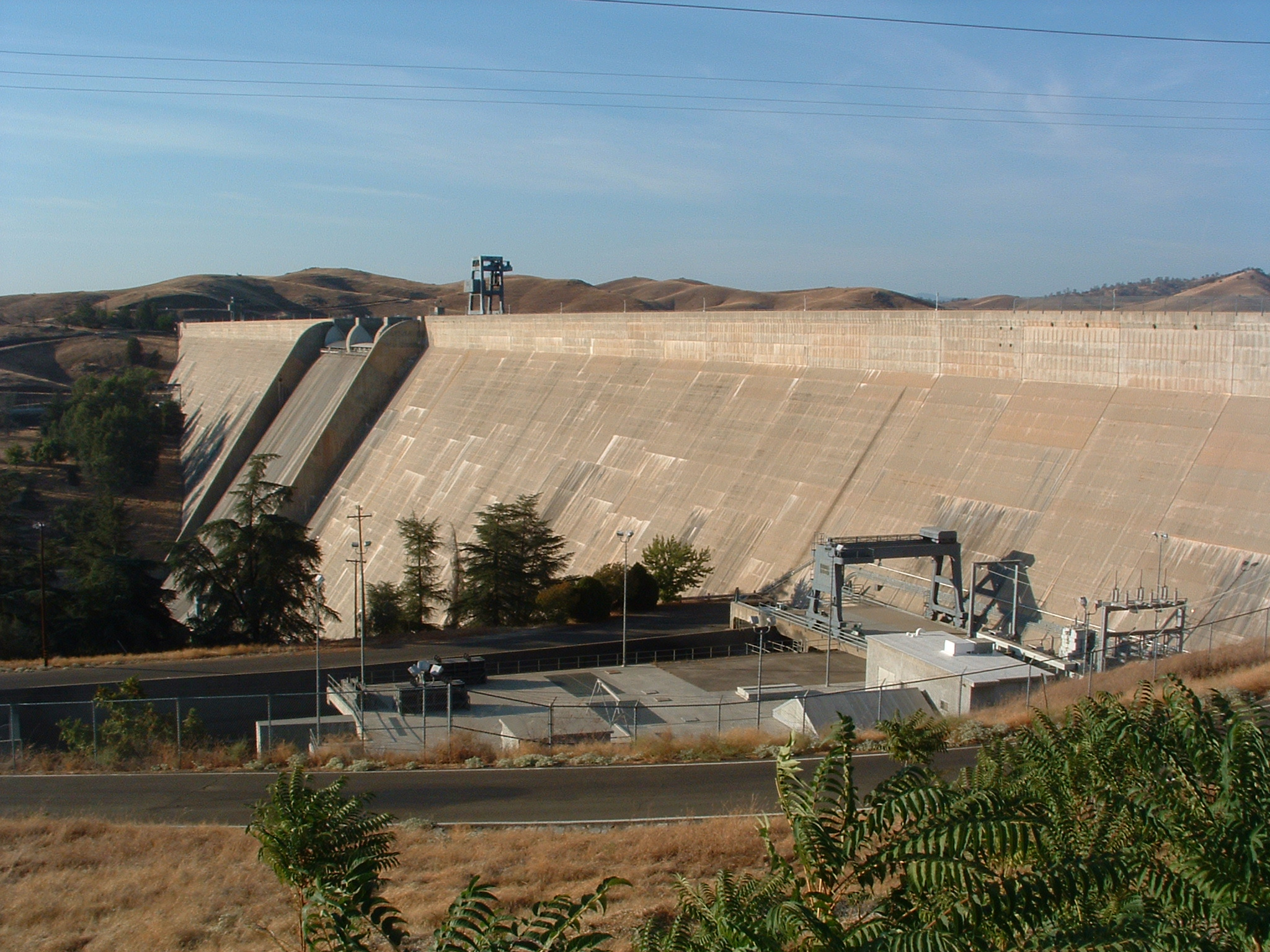
- Interactive map of Friant Dam
- Country: United States
- Location: Madera/Fresno Counties, California
- Coordinates: 37°00′02″N 119°42′19″W
- Construction began: 1937; 89 years ago
- Opening date: 1942; 84 years ago
- Owner: Central Valley Project United States Bureau of Reclamation

Dam and spillways
- Type of dam: Concrete gravity
- Impounds: San Joaquin River
- Height: 319 ft (97 m)
- Length: 3,488 ft (1,063 m)
- Width (base): 267 ft (81 m)
- Spillway type: Gated overflow, 1 center flotation drum gate, 2 obermeyer pneumatically actuated gates.
- Spillway capacity: 83,000 cu ft/s (2,400 m^{3}/s)

Reservoir
- Creates: Millerton Lake
- Total capacity: 520,528 acre⋅ft (642,062 dam^{3})
- Inactive capacity: 120,000 acre⋅ft (150,000 dam^{3})
- Catchment area: 1,638 mi^{2} (4,240 km^{2})
- Surface area: 4,900 acres (2,000 ha)

Power Station
- Turbines: 1x 15 MW, 1x 8 MW, 1x 2 MW
- Installed capacity: 25 MW
- Annual generation: 81,409,000 KWh

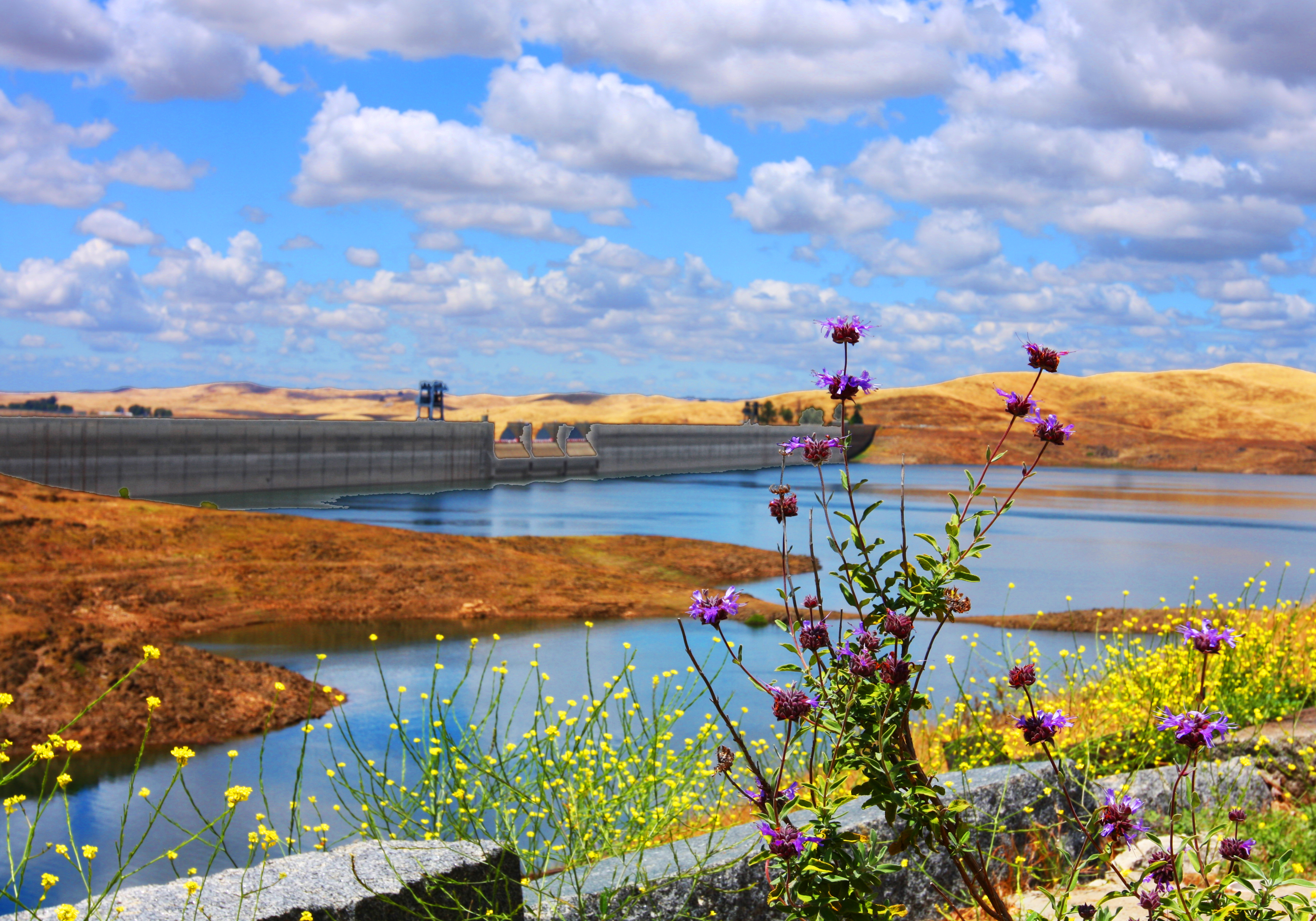
Friant Dam & Millerton Lake, 2012

Friant Dam is a concrete gravity dam on the San Joaquin River in central California in the United States, on the boundary of Fresno and Madera Counties. It was built between 1937 and 1942 as part of a U.S. Bureau of Reclamation (USBR) water project to provide irrigation water to the southern San Joaquin Valley. The dam impounds Millerton Lake, a 4,900-acre (2,000 ha) reservoir about 15 miles (24 km) north of Fresno.

== Background ==
The valley in which Friant Dam and Millerton Lake now lie was once the location of the historic town of Millerton. Millerton was the first county seat of Fresno County. In 1880, the first dam on the San Joaquin River was constructed by the Upper San Joaquin Irrigation Company roughly on the present site of Friant Dam. Built of local rock, the dam was an 800-foot (240 m) long, 6-foot (1.8 m) tall structure designed to divert water for the irrigation of 250,000 acres (100,000 ha). The project was abandoned after floods destroyed the dam two years later.

Friant Dam was originally proposed in the 1930s as a main feature of the Central Valley Project (CVP), a federal water project that would involve building an expansive system of dams and canals on the rivers of the Central Valley to provide water for agriculture, with secondary purposes of flood control, municipal supply, and hydroelectric power generation. The CVP was authorized by the 1935 Rivers and Harbors Act, while $20 million of initial funding for Friant Dam was provided by the Emergency Relief Appropriation Act of 1935.

Initial surveys of the Friant Dam site began in November 1935 and continued into early 1936. In January 1938, workers established a camp near the town of Friant to house the laborers who would ultimately work on the dam. During the Great Depression, the Friant Dam site saw a huge influx of job seekers, many of whom lived farther away in surrounding cities. More than 50,000 people attended the groundbreaking of the dam on November 5, 1939 in a celebration that is now known as "one of the greatest in San Joaquin Valley history".

== Construction ==
Construction of Friant Dam began with blasting and excavation of the dam site to remove more than 1,200,000 cubic yards (920,000 m^{3}) of loose material above the bedrock. Before any concrete was laid on the dam's main wall, the underlying rock was extensively grouted to fill in 725 holes and seams that might otherwise cause instability in the foundation. The concrete used in the dam's construction was made from sand and gravel excavated from the San Joaquin River floodplain about 3 miles (4.8 km) below the dam to form Lost Lake. Notably, more than 5,400 ounces (150 kg) of placer gold – worth $176,000 at the time – were uncovered in the excavation site. A branch line of the Southern Pacific Railroad delivered this material to a concrete mixing plant, which could produce up to 6,000 cubic yards (4,600 m^{3}) of concrete per hour, directly adjacent to the construction site. In July 1940, the San Joaquin River was diverted through a wooden flume so that work on the foundations could begin.

On July 29, the first concrete was poured into the main body of Friant Dam. The dam was built in a series of forms, each measuring 50 feet (15 m) square. Concrete was placed via a massive steel trestle system 210 feet (64 m) high and 2,200 feet (670 m) long, along which ran small powered railcars that delivered buckets of concrete from the mixing plant. Two gantry cranes lifted the buckets from the cars and poured them onto the forms. In summer 1941, the labor force reached a peak of 1,500, and the monthly record for concrete placement, at 228,000 cubic yards (174,000 m^{3}), was set in August.

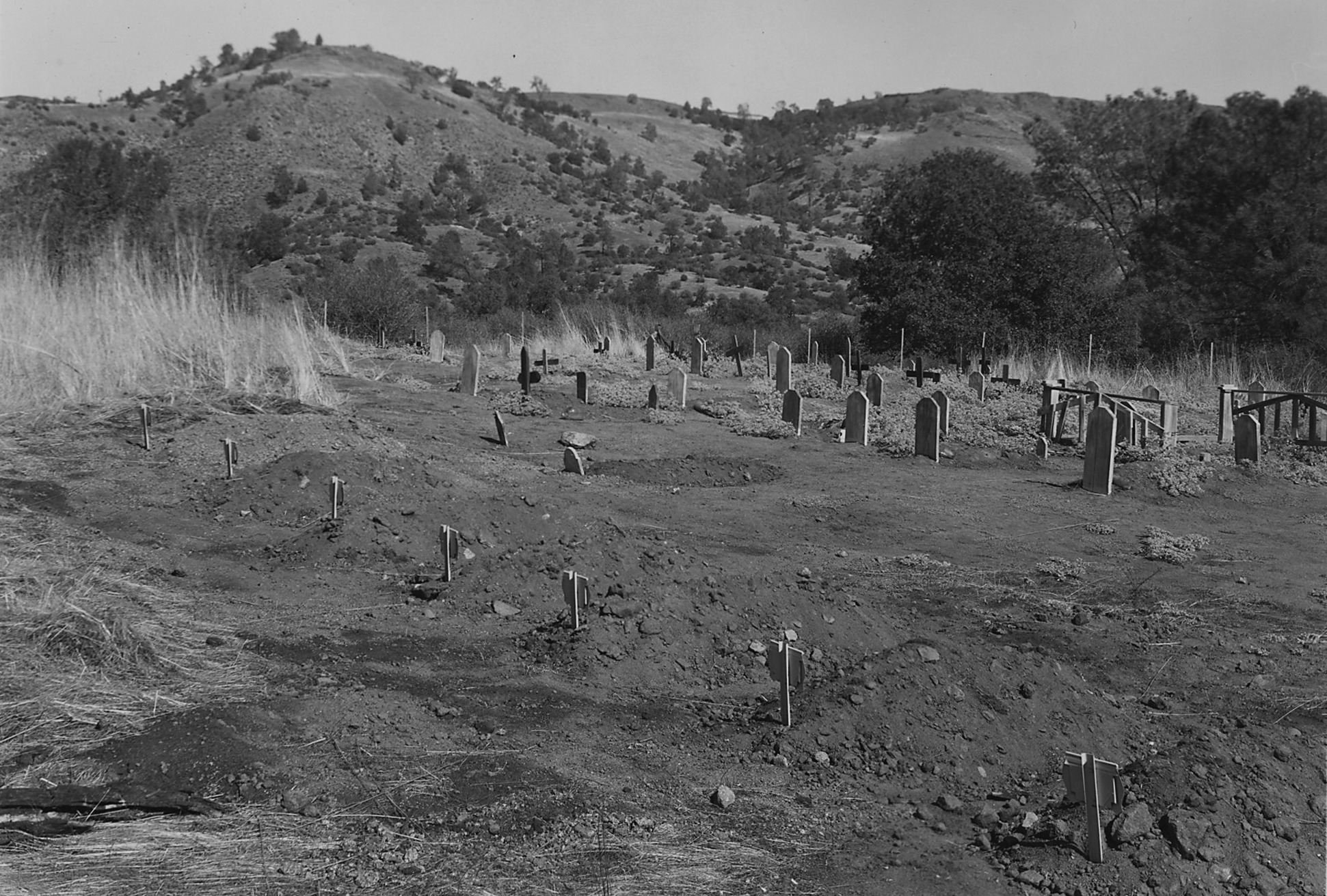
U.S. government photograph of several re-interred Native Americans whose graves had been in the dam's planned reservoir

During the dam's construction several Native American burial sites had their graves removed and re-interred.

The workforce scrambled to complete the main wall of the dam after an act of the War Production Board (WPB) suspended resources in order to assist U.S. military efforts in World War II. The dam was topped out on June 16, 1942, just under two years after the first concrete was poured. However, the spillway gates, the water release valves and the two irrigation canals Friant was intended to support remained unfinished in the wake of the WPB's order.

The war, however, did not completely halt construction. Less than a year later, the WPB "[determined] the completion of the Madera Canal and the installation of valves at the Friant Dam, necessary for war-time food and fiber production" – allowing construction to resume on a limited scale. A pair of control valves were borrowed from Hoover Dam, allowing the closure of the river outlets and Millerton Lake began to fill on February 21, 1944. Work on the Madera Canal, the smaller of the two irrigation canals serviced by Friant Dam (the other, the Friant-Kern Canal, would not be completed for another four years), was completed in 1945 and water ran for its entire length for the first time on June 10, with irrigation deliveries commencing one month later.

The dam was formally dedicated on July 9, 1949 by California governor Earl Warren, who declared that the water furnished by Friant Dam and its canals would help the San Joaquin Valley to "become a modern Eden" as water was released into the partially completed Friant-Kern Canal for the first time. More than three thousand people, mostly residents of the San Joaquin Valley, attended the ceremonies.

[The dam is] but a lifeline to preserve and enhance our American civilization. This is a line of creation, built to unlock the fertility of the rich soil, to resist drought, to overcome floods, to provide outdoor recreation, and to generate cheap power that will improve the living conditions of millions of our citizens."
– Secretary of the Interior Harold Ickes at Friant Dam dedication

== Operations and usage ==
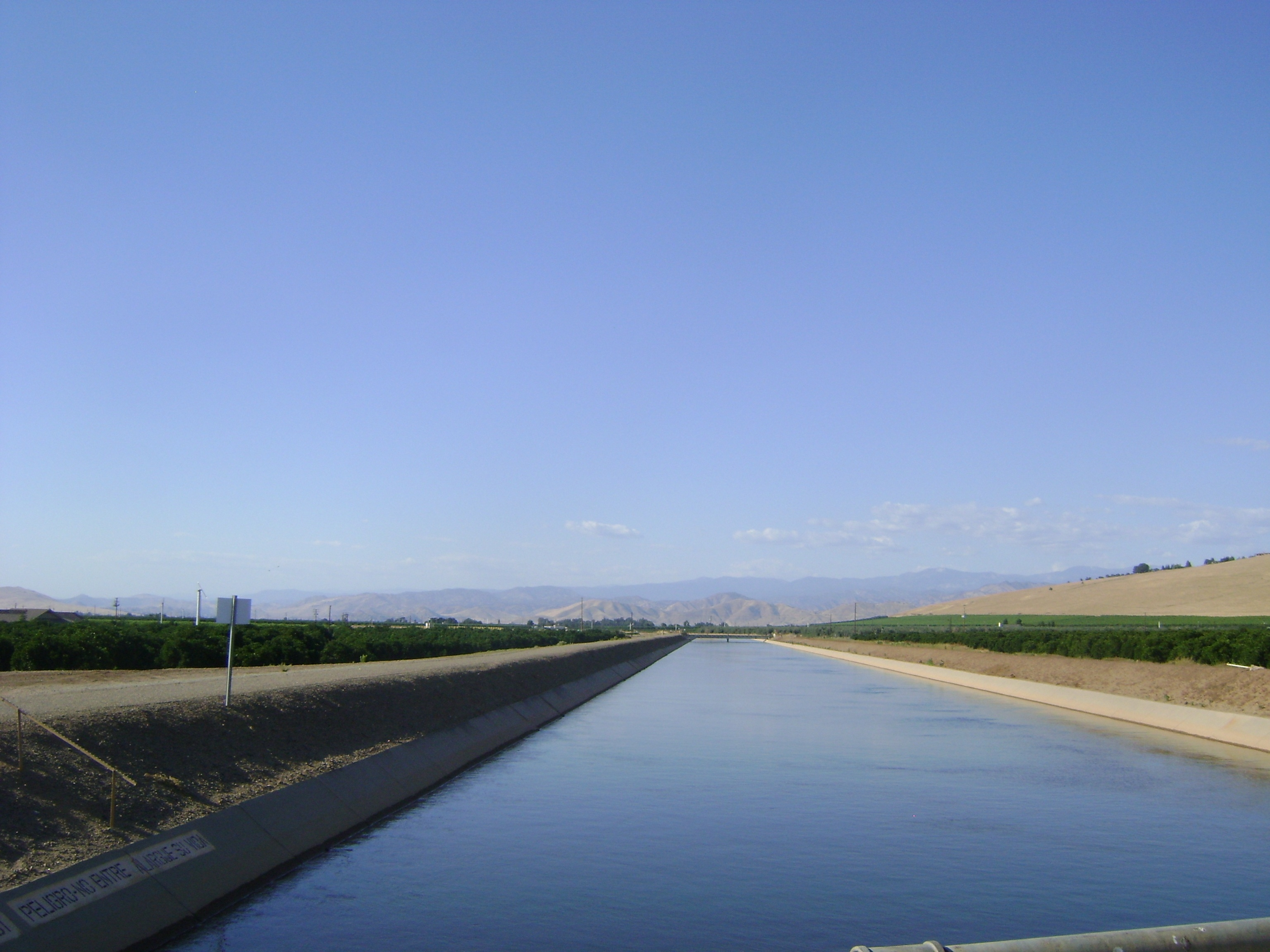
The Friant-Kern Canal, the larger of the two canals supplied with water from Friant Dam

Friant Dam's primary purpose is to capture the fluctuating flows of the San Joaquin River and divert the water for irrigation through the Friant-Kern and Madera Canals. The Friant-Kern Canal is 151.8 mi (244.3 km) long, extending south from the dam to the Kern River near Bakersfield, and has an initial diversion capacity of 5,000 cubic feet per second (140 m^{3}/s); the 35.9-mile (57.8 km) Madera Canal, which has a capacity of up to 1,000 cubic feet per second (28 m^{3}/s), travels north from the dam to the Chowchilla River. Together, these canals provide irrigation water to some 837,000 acres (339,000 ha) of the San Joaquin Valley. In 1990, farmers who received their water from Friant Dam produced more than $1.9 billion worth of 90 different kinds of crops.

Millerton Lake has a capacity of 520,528 acre-feet (642,062 dam^{3}) at normal maximum pool, with a surcharge (above spillway gates, but below the dam crest) capacity of approximately 91,000 acre-feet (112,000 dam^{3}) for a total capacity of 611,500 acre-feet (754,300 dam^{3}). About 170,000 acre-feet (210,000 dam^{3}), or 32.7% of the reservoir's regular capacity, is reserved for flood control between October and January to protect against rain floods, while between February and July, this is increased to 390,500 acre-feet (481,700 dam^{3}) – 75.0% – to provide space for snowmelt floods. The dam is operated to maintain a flow of 6,500 cubic feet per second (180 m^{3}/s) or less on the San Joaquin River at Mendota, 60 miles (97 km) downriver. However, large snowmelt floods often exceed the capacity of the dam and reservoir and force larger releases downstream, potentially causing damage to riverside property and infrastructure.

The dam is also used to generate up to 25 megawatts (MW) of hydroelectric power. The penstock releasing water into the Friant-Kern Canal is fitted with a Kaplan turbine with a capacity of 15 MW, and the Madera Canal penstock is equipped with a smaller 8 MW turbine. The smallest hydroelectric generator, with a capacity of 2 MW, is located at the outlet works on the base of the dam and produces power from water releases that serve local farms along the San Joaquin River directly downstream from Friant Dam, as well as releases to a fish hatchery below the dam and for wildlife management purposes.

== Expansion ==
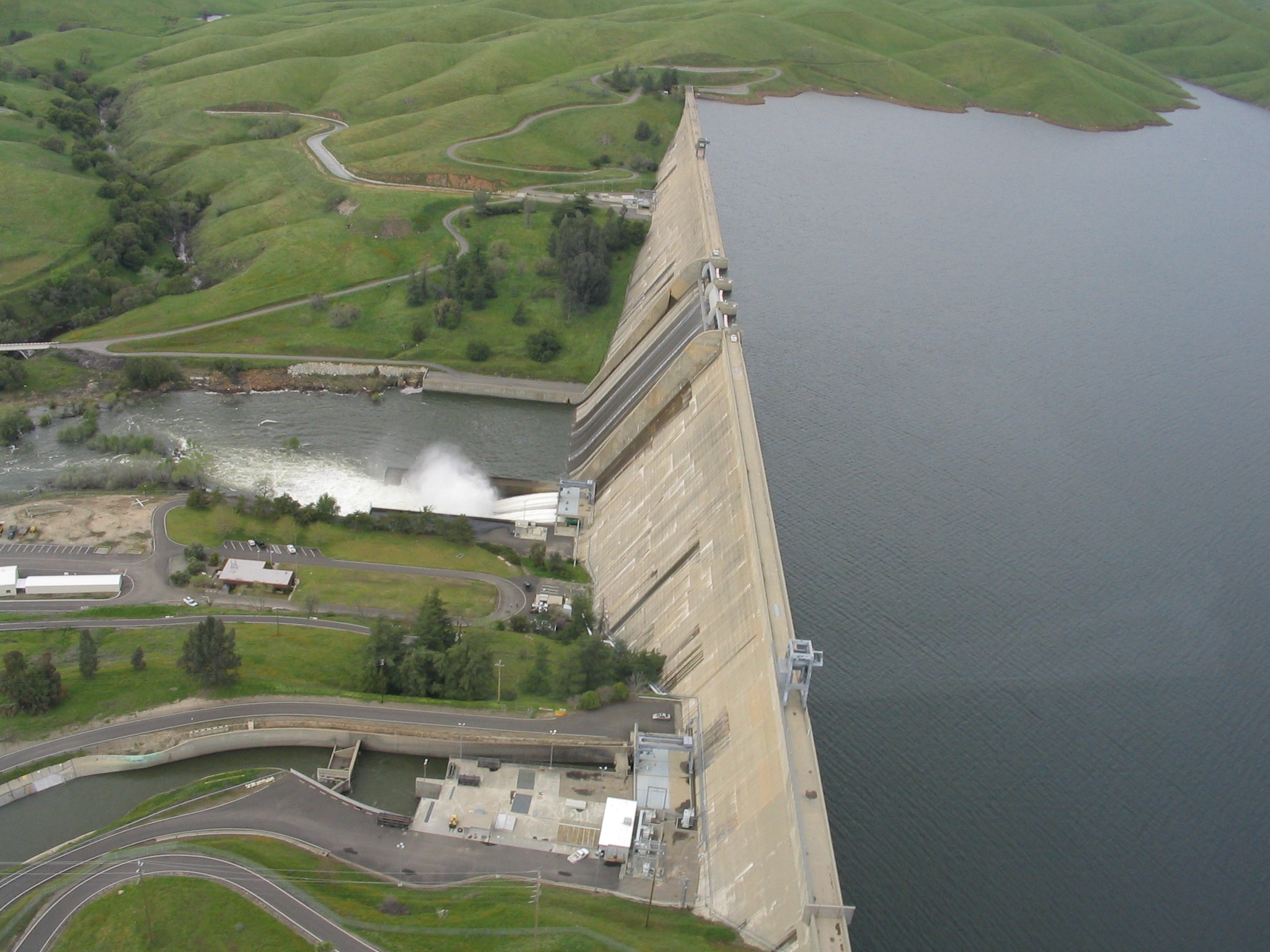
Friant Dam and Millerton Lake in 2006, filled to capacity and releasing floodwater

Because of its relatively small storage capacity relative to the average annual discharge of the San Joaquin River – 520,528 acre-feet (642,062 dam^{3}) versus 1,790,000 acre-feet (2,210,000 dam^{3}) – Friant Dam often has to release excessive amounts of water that could be otherwise used for irrigation or power generation, also causing downstream damage. From 1981 to 2011, an average of 450,000 acre-feet (560,000 dam^{3}) was spilled each year because the reservoir was unable to contain it. The USBR has proposed increasing the height of Friant Dam by up to 140 feet (43 m), nearly tripling the reservoir's storage capacity to 1,390,000 acre-feet (1,710,000 dam^{3}). A smaller 60-foot (18 m) raise would increase storage capacity to 860,500 acre-feet (1,061,400 dam^{3}), while a 25-foot (7.6 m) raise would increase storage capacity to 652,500 acre-feet (804,800 dam^{3}). The increase in height would also allow for the generation of between 4.7–30.4 MW of additional power.

Another proposal to increase storage in the upper San Joaquin River basin is Temperance Flat Dam, which would be located in the San Joaquin River canyon upstream of Friant Dam and impound between 460,000 to 2,775,000 acre-feet (567,000 to 3,423,000 dam^{3}) of water. The proposed dam would stand 415 to 840 feet (126 to 256 m) high above the river, and it would capture most of the floodwater that would otherwise be spilled from Friant Dam. However, Temperance Flat has come under heavy controversy because it would flood a large scenic section of the San Joaquin River gorge, negatively affect wildlife in the river and inundate two upstream hydroelectric power plants, causing a net loss in power generation. The water supplied from such a dam would be very expensive, ranging from $1000–1500 per acre foot (area farmers currently pay about $60 per acre foot). Raising Friant Dam would likely produce similar increases in the cost of irrigation water.

== Environmental impacts ==
By diverting most of the San Joaquin River for irrigation, the Friant Dam has caused about 60 miles (97 km) of the river to run dry except in high water years when floodwaters are spilled from the dam. The desiccation of the river has caused the degradation of large stretches of riverside habitat and marshes, and has nearly eliminated the historic chinook salmon run that once numbered "possibly in the range of 200,000 to 500,000 spawners annually". Reduction in flows has also increased the concentration of pesticide and fertilizer runoff in the river contributing to pollution that has further impacted aquatic species.

On September 13, 2006, after eighteen years of litigation, environmental groups, fisherman and the USBR reached an agreement on releasing part of the water currently diverted into the irrigation canals into the San Joaquin River in order to help restore the river and its native fish and wildlife. The first water was released on October 2, 2009 at a rate of 185 cubic feet per second (5.2 m^{3}/s). By 2014, these "restoration flows" will be increased to 302,000 acre-feet (373,000 dam^{3}) per year, or 417 cubic feet per second (11.8 m^{3}/s), on top of the 117,000 acre-feet (144,000 dam^{3}) that is currently released for agricultural purposes. However, the river restoration project will cause a 12–20% reduction in irrigation water delivered from Friant Dam.

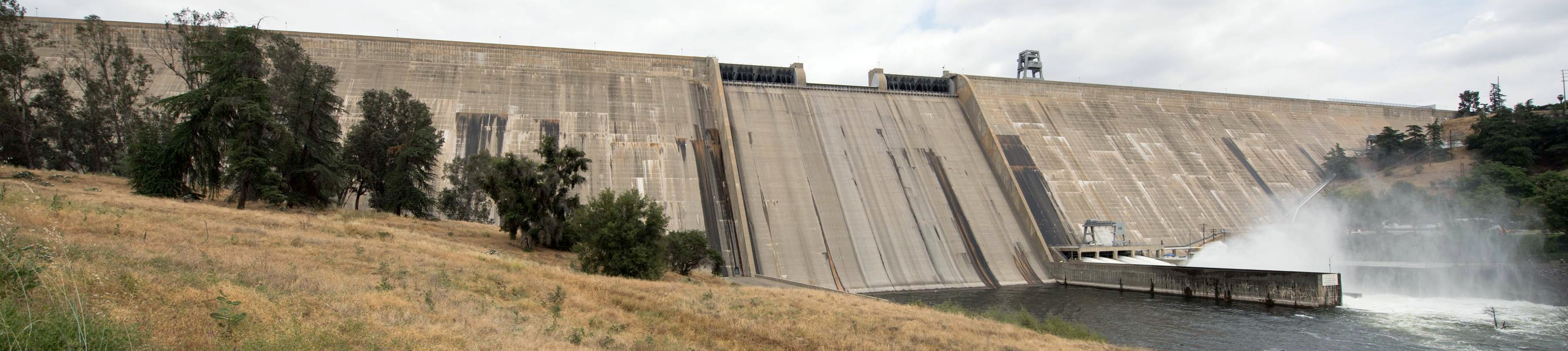
Friant Dam, 2017

== See also ==
- Water in California
- California Water Wars
- List of dams and reservoirs in California
- List of largest reservoirs of California
- List of the tallest dams in the United States

== Works cited ==
- Billington, David P.; Jackson, Donald C.; Melosi, Martin V. (2005). The History of Large Federal Dams: Planning, Design, and Construction. Government Printing Office. ISBN 0-16072-823-1.
- Brewer, Chris (2001). Historic Kern County: An Illustrated History of Bakersfield and Kern County. San Antonio, TX: HPN Books. ISBN 1893619141.
