= Rockville High School =

Rockville High School may refer to a school in the United States:

- Rockville High School (Connecticut), a high school in Vernon, Connecticut
- Rockville High School (Maryland), a high school in Rockville, Maryland
- Rockville High School (Indiana), a high school in Rockville, Indiana
