= Rockville Township =

Rockville Township may refer to the following townships in the United States:

- Rockville Township, Kankakee County, Illinois
- Rockville Township, Stearns County, Minnesota
- Rockville Township, Bates County, Missouri
