= Rockville Station (disambiguation) =

Rockville station is a railroad station in Maryland, United States.

Rockville Station may also refer to:

- Rockville Centre station, a railroad station in New York, United States
- Rockville Air Force Station, a closed air force station in Indiana, United States
- Rockville Air Station, a closed U.S. air force station in Iceland
