= Rockville, Wisconsin =

Rockville in the U.S. state of Wisconsin may refer to:

- Rockville, Grant County, Wisconsin, an unincorporated community
- Rockville, Manitowoc County, Wisconsin, an unincorporated community
