= Rocky Hill, Tulare County, California =

Unincorporated community in California, United States

Ruffa
- Unincorporated community
- Location in California Ruffa (the United States)
- Coordinates: 36°17′14″N 119°05′07″W
- Country: United States
- State: California
- County: Tulare
- Elevation: 1,549 ft (472 m)

Rocky Hill is an unincorporated community in Tulare County, California, United States. It lies at an elevation of 1549 feet (472 m).
