= Temperance Flat Dam =

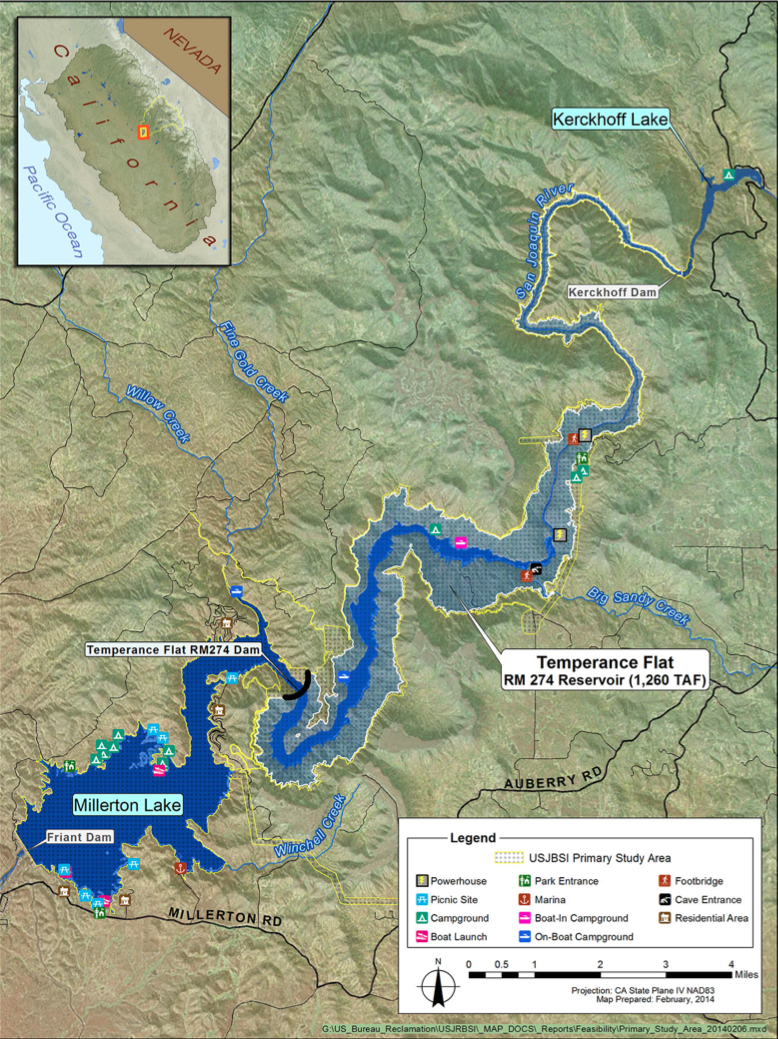
- A map showing reservoir outline of the proposed reservoir at RM 274, at an elevation of 985 ft (300 m). The reservoir would partially inundate both Millerton and Kerckhoff reservoirs.
- Interactive map of Temperance Flat Dam
- Country: United States
- Location: Fresno / Madera counties, near Auberry, California
- Coordinates: 37.0342°N 119.6293°W
- Status: Proposed
- Construction cost: $2.5–3.3 billion
- Owner: U.S. Bureau of Reclamation

Dam and spillways
- Type of dam: Roller-compacted concrete gravity arch
- Height: 665 ft (203 m)
- Length: 1,600 ft (490 m)
- Spillway type: Uncontrolled ogee crest
- Spillway capacity: 145,000 cu ft/s (4,100 m^{3}/s)

Reservoir
- Creates: Temperance Flat Reservoir
- Total capacity: 1,260,000 acre⋅ft (1,550,000 dam^{3})
- Catchment area: 1,600 mi^{2} (4,100 km^{2})
- Surface area: 5,700 acres (2,300 ha)

Power Station
- Type: Conventional
- Turbines: 3
- Installed capacity: 160 MW
- Annual generation: 84 GWh

Temperance Flat Dam is a proposed dam project on the San Joaquin River west of Auberry, California. Construction of the dam is on hold. The dam's main purpose would be to supplement storage capacity in the upper San Joaquin River basin. Under the current proposal, Temperance Flat would slightly more than double water storage on the San Joaquin River from below Friant Dam. The project is highly controversial because it would flood scenic canyons and historic sites along the San Joaquin River, and impact upstream hydroelectricity generation. The Bureau of Reclamation estimates the construction costs will be between US$2.5 billion and $2.6 billion, while other estimates range from $2.96 billion up to $3.35 billion. At 665 feet (203 m), Temperance Flat Dam would be the second highest dam in California, and the fifth tallest dam in the United States.

In February 2014, Representative Jim Costa (D-CA) introduced H.R. 4127, to authorize construction of the Temperance Flat Dam. The Bureau of Reclamation released a draft environmental impact statement for the project in September 2014. The dam was one of three major storage projects funded by a $7.5 billion water bond, passed in November 2014. Of the $7.5 billion bond, $2.7 billion was to be reserved for the three projects, with an estimated $1.25 billion going to fund the Temperance Flat Dam. The construction of the dam was put on indefinite hold in 2020 due to cost and conservation concerns. As of January 2026, there have been no plans of project resumption.

== Specifications and benefits ==
The U.S. Bureau of Reclamation, which would be responsible for construction and operation of Temperance Flat, previously had proposed three potential dam sites along the San Joaquin River – at river mile (RM) 274 (RKM 441), RM 279 (449), and RM 286 (RKM 460). A dam at any of these sites would be either of rockfill, concrete gravity or concrete arch design, ranging in height from 415 to 840 ft (126 to 256 m), with their reservoirs ranging in size from 460,000 to 2,775,000 acre⋅ft (0.567 to 3.423 km^{3}). Since the RM 274 and RM 279 sites are located in the upper reaches of Millerton Lake, the reservoir of Friant Dam, some of the water in their reservoirs would replace the existing storage in Millerton, instead of adding new capacity. Most of the previously proposed reservoir heights would flood the upstream Kerckhoff Lake.

As of January 2014, the Bureau of Reclamation has limited the proposed dam to RM 274, with four alternatives on the specifics of the project. The Bureau of Reclamation estimates that the annual net benefit for California of this proposed dam will range from a cost of $22.7 million to a benefit of $41 million, with an average benefit of $14.2 million for all proposed alternative plans. Annual operations and management costs would be between $16.7 and 25.1 million. The average cost-benefit ratio for California across all the alternatives is 1.12, which is reached after spreading the costs of construction over 100 years. Without including the highly subjective ecosystem benefits, the highest cost-benefit ratio is 0.83. At the 6-county level, the ratio when including the ecosystem benefits is at most 0.87. The methods used to calculate environmental benefits are not readily available online.

As the Temperance Flat Reservoir would inundate several existing hydroelectric powerhouses, the most recent proposal for the dam has a larger hydroelectric capacity of 160 MW.

Temperance Flat would allow the San Joaquin River reservoir system to capture significant amounts of winter and spring runoff that would otherwise be spilled downstream because of insufficient storage capacity. Estimates range from 165,000 to 183,000 acre⋅ft (0.204 to 0.226 km^{3}) of water conserved each year. By increasing the surface water yield from the San Joaquin River, the dam and reservoir would help reduce the need for groundwater extraction in the San Joaquin Valley for irrigation.

The Bureau of Reclamation estimates that after construction of the dam the long-term average increase in spring-run chinook salmon abundance would vary from between 0.65% and 2.7%, averaged across all four alternatives, for worst case and best case smolt-to-adult return rates, respectively. 25% of the scenarios decreased long-term chinook salmon abundance.

== Impacts ==
Filling Temperance Flat Reservoir above an elevation of 1,100 feet (340 m) would inundate several hydroelectric plants of the Big Creek Hydroelectric Project, that have a total capacity of 313 MW and generate 1,125 million KWh annually. Thus, the Temperance Flat Dam project would cause a net loss of hydroelectric generation, in lieu of massive reconstruction of upstream facilities. Additionally, 240 foot tall embankment cofferdams would be built on streams surrounding the area in order to divert flows. In their most recent draft, the Bureau of Reclamation deleted measures to construct temperature control devices on Friant Dam, which are known to improve habitat quality for salmon. They additionally deleted a measure which would have increased water quality downstream of Millerton Lake.

The Bureau of Reclamation notes that construction of the dam and reservoir will have "unavoidable and/or disproportionately high and adverse" impacts on the following: air quality, fisheries, aquatic ecosystems, botanical and wetland resources, wildlife, climate change and greenhouse gas emissions, cultural resources, agricultural resources, noise and vibration, and visual resources.

As the Temperance Flat Dam would flood both historic Kerckhoff powerhouses, the hydroelectric generating capacity of Kerckhoff Reservoir would be entirely removed. The proposed Temperance flat power system would only be able to replace between 81% and 91% of that power. An additional 15.7–15.8 GWh of power could be generated by maximizing output at Friant Dam, but this still results in a net loss of hydroelectric power generation, or only a very slight increase, depending on the alternative specified. A dam of similar size, New Bullards Bar Dam, has an annual power generation of nearly 16 times that of the proposed Temperance Flat Dam, even discounting the reduction in power generation from the loss of the Kerckhoff powerhouses.

Some environmental groups such as Friends of the River have questioned the effectiveness of the Temperance Flat project on increasing surface water supplies in California, calling it "an expensive and ineffective solution to the state's water needs". In addition, the placement of the Temperance Flat Dam at RM 274 would reduce the capacity of Millerton Lake by 75,000 acre feet, a capacity greater than 150 of California's current reservoirs.

Local Native American tribes have identified 30 sensitive sites within the Temperance Flat study area, one of which was defined by the Native American Heritage Commission as sacred.

The proposed reservoir would inundate 18 miles (29 km) of the San Joaquin River, which includes scenic canyons, whitewater rapids and historic and cultural sites, as well as reducing the water flow to sensitive habitat in the Sacramento–San Joaquin Delta. Reduction of spring flood flows, via capture by Temperance Flat dam, could reduce rearing habitat for spawning salmonids downstream. Bald eagles, several special-status bat species, ringtails, American badgers, and San Joaquin pocket mice are found in the Temperance Flat study area. Western pond turtles, which are a California Species of Special Concern, occur regularly at several sites along the proposed flooded area. Additionally, the California tiger salamander, is federally listed as vulnerable in this area and has designated critical habitat nearby.

== Alternatives ==
Tulare Lake is seen as an alternative to the Temperance Flat Dam. It would store twice as much water, but at one-fifth the cost.

== See also ==
- List of dams and reservoirs in California
- Sites Reservoir
- Water in California
