= Madera Canal =

Coordinates: 37.000505°N 119.712645°W

The Madera Canal is a 35.9 mi (57.8 km)-long aqueduct in the U.S. state of California. It is part of the Central Valley Project managed by the United States Bureau of Reclamation to convey water north to augment irrigation capacity in Madera County. It was also the subject of the United States Supreme Court's decision in Central Green Co. v. United States.

The Madera Canal begins at Millerton Lake, a reservoir on the San Joaquin River north of Fresno. The canal runs north along the eastern edge of the San Joaquin Valley, ending at the Chowchilla River east of Chowchilla. Average annual throughput is 256,100 acre-feet (315,900,000 m^{3}).

The Madera Canal has a capacity of 1,000 cubic feet per second (28 m^{3}/s), gradually decreasing to 625 cu ft/s (17.7 m^{3}/s) at the terminus. It was completed in 1945. The headworks was rebuilt in 1965 to deliver 1,250 cu ft/s (35 m^{3}/s).
