= Miller Red Barn =

Historic barn in Santa Clara County, California, United States

- U.S. National Register of Historic Places
- Christmas Hill Park Red Barn
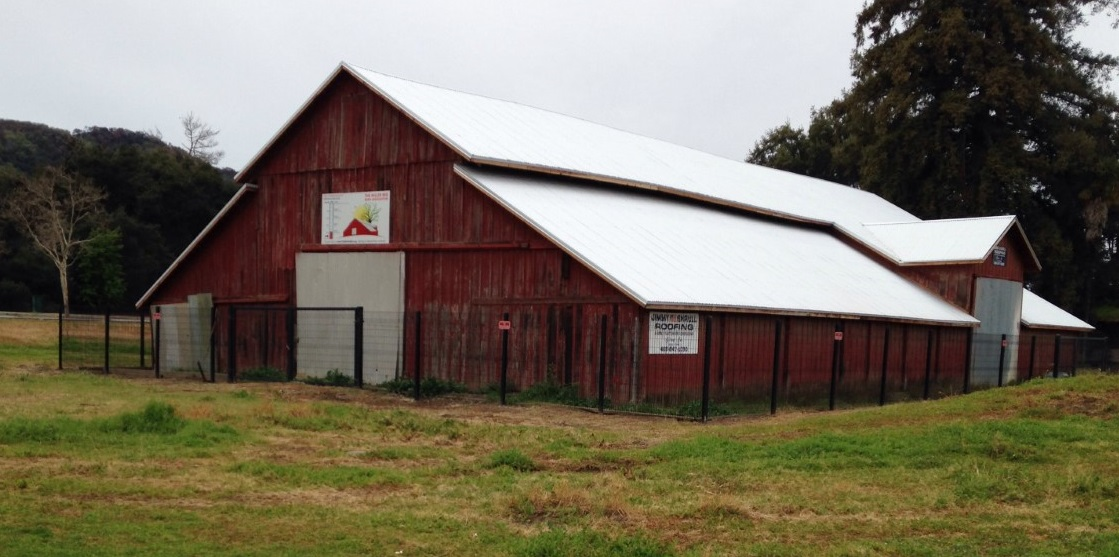
- The Henry Miller Red Barn

- Location within California
- Location: 7049 Miller Avenue, Gilroy, California, US
- Coordinates: 36°59′54″N 121°35′18″W
- Built: 1891
- Architectural style: Vernacular architecture
- Website: millerredbarn.org
- NRHP reference No.: 16000665
- Added to NRHP: September 26, 2016

The Miller Red Barn is a historic wooden hay barn constructed in 1891, in Gilroy, California, using pole construction techniques. It was erected on land belonging to Henry Miller, a prominent California cattle baron of that era. The barn is most known for its connection to agriculture production in Santa Clara County, and its role within the agricultural estate of Henry Miller, who was a partner in the cattle-raising and meat-packing enterprise of Miller & Lux in San Francisco. The Miller Red Barn was placed on the National Register of Historic Places on September 26, 2016.

== History ==
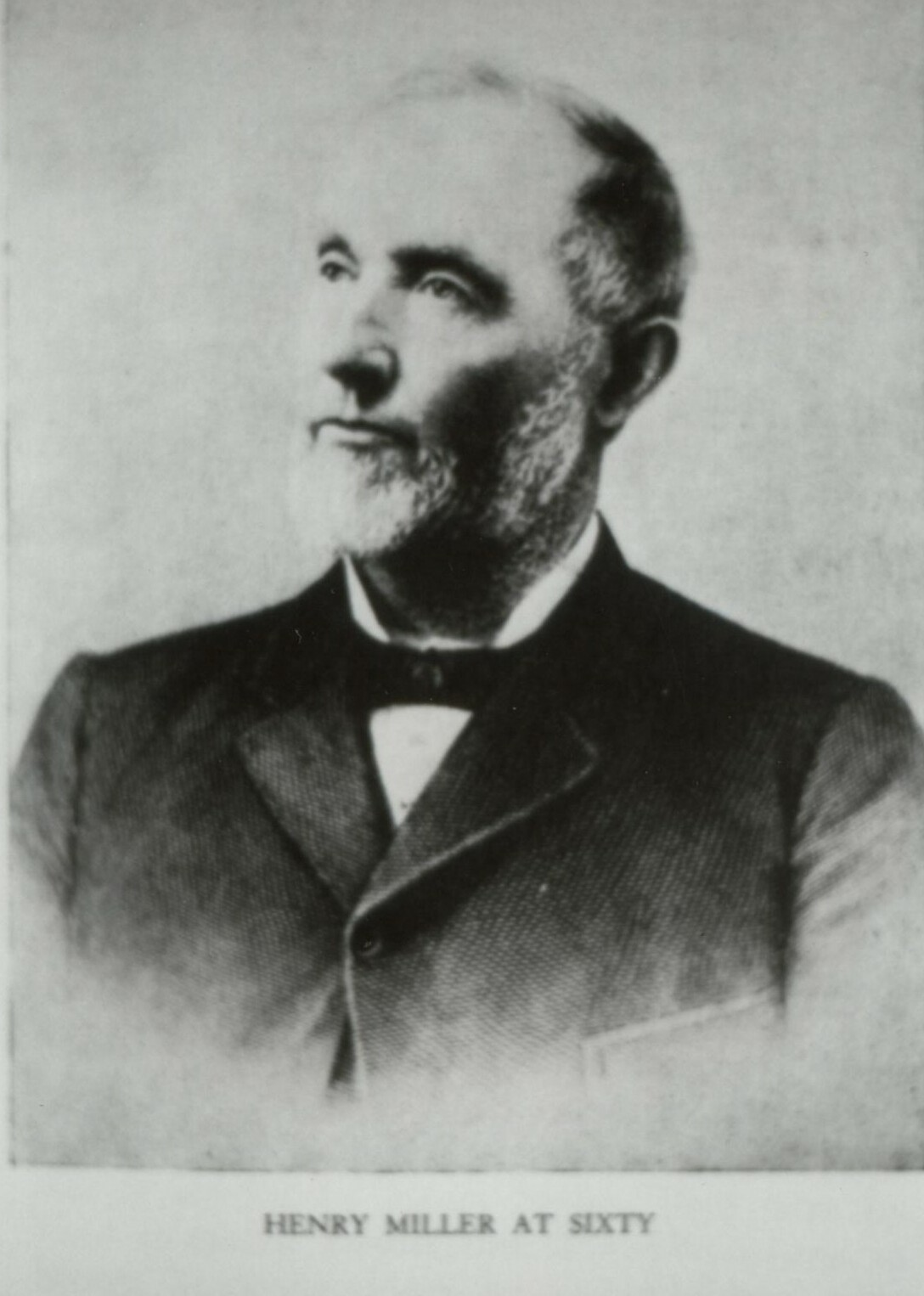
Henry Miller c. 1887

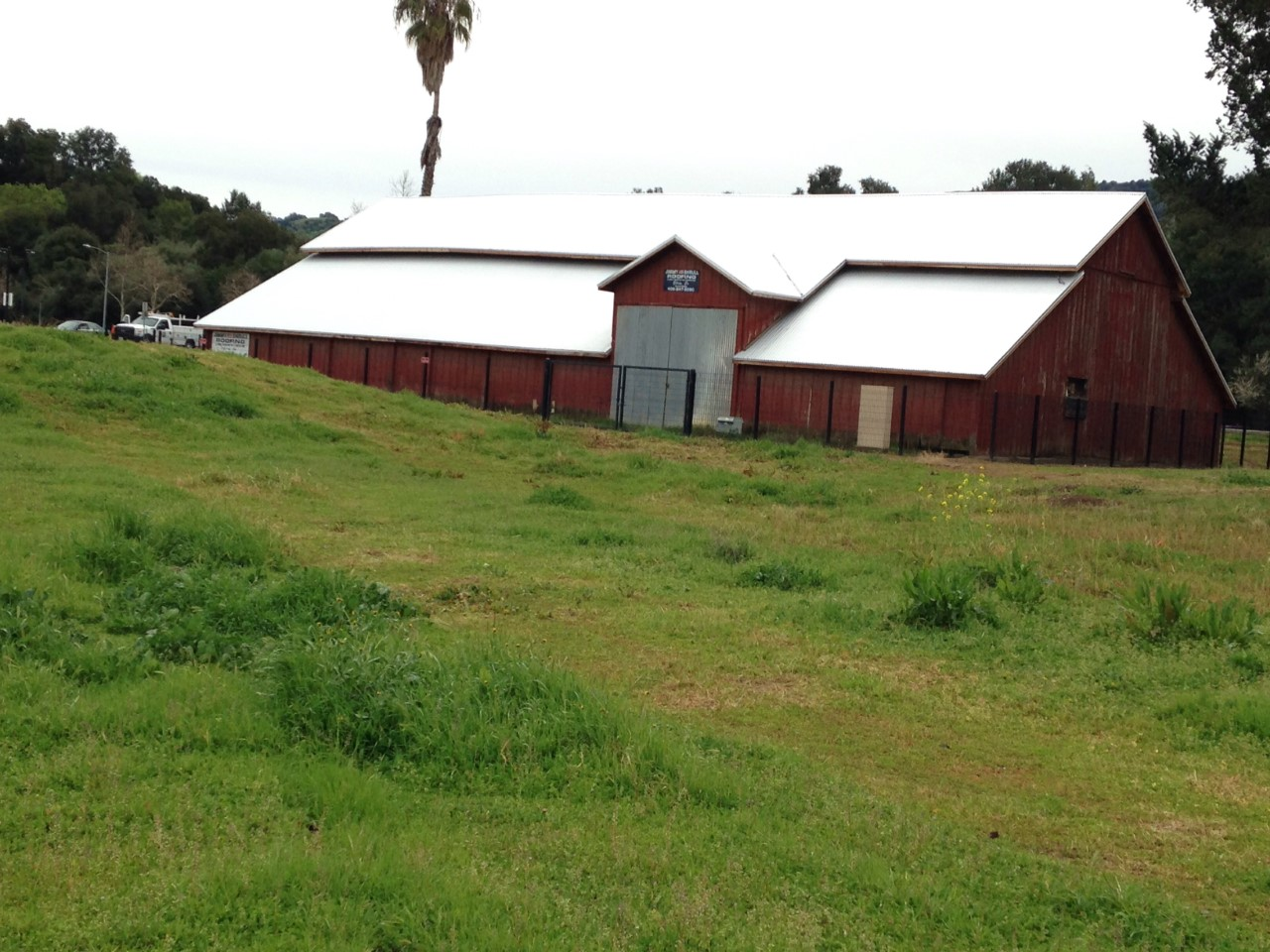
East Side of the Miller Red Barn

Constructed in 1891, the Miller Red Barn was commissioned by rancher Henry Miller (1827–1916) on the Glen Ranch, formerly part of Rancho Las Animas. It is currently recognized as the Ranch Site Addition of Christmas Hill Park, a 51-acre community park operated by the city of Gilroy. Initially, its primary function was to serve as a local storage facility for hay to feed Henry Miller's cattle and horses. In subsequent years, the barn was repurposed for the processing of tree fruits cultivated on Miller's land.

In the early 1900s, Glen Farm shifted its agricultural focus from growing tree fruits to the cultivation of wine grapes. By 1906, with the wine grape industry in Santa Clara County gradually migrating southward, Henry Miller entered into a 15-year lease agreement with the California Wine Association to operate Glen Farm. In 1941, the San Martin Winery acquired Glen Farm, and they continued to use the barn for winemaking purposes for an extended duration.

In 1962, a portion of Glen Farm was generously donated to the city of Gilroy by an interim owner with the intention of establishing Christmas Hill Park for public access. This park subsequently became the venue for the annual two-day Gilroy Garlic Festival during the summer months. As the festival's popularity grew, attracting larger crowds, concerns about high attendance emerged. In 1990, with the support of the Garlic Festival Association, the city acquired the section of Glen Ranch adjoining Christmas Hill Park, which also included the barn. For several years, the city permitted the Garlic Festival to utilize the barn for storing event signs. However, as time passed, worries about the structural integrity of the barn led the city to discontinue any use of the building. In 2013, the city opted to proceed with the demolition of the barn, sparking public concern and initiating a movement aimed at preserving and restoring this historic structure.

On September 22, 2018, the Miller Red Barn Association organized a fundraising dinner with the aim of raising funds to support an ongoing project involving the construction of a new foundation floor for the barn. In April 2020, the Santa Clara County Board of Supervisors, acting on the advice of the Historical Heritage Commission, granted the Miller Red Barn Association a sum of $297,008. The association intends to use the funds for various improvements, including replacing a section of the wooden flooring within the barn, swapping out the aluminum doors for redwood ones, establishing historical exhibits, and giving the barn a fresh coat of paint along with new siding. The barn will be raised in sections to facilitate the replacement of its foundation.

== Design ==
The barn stands at a height of 25 ft (7.6 m), with a total area of 5,358 square feet (497.8 m^{2}). It is a vernacular-style barn, belonging to the Western-style barn category commonly found in the Western United States. These types of barns were designed to accommodate the storage of substantial amounts of feed, which was necessary for supporting the maintenance of large herds of animals.

The upper central portion of the roof incorporates a small raised monitor designed for enhanced ventilation, situated above the extended lower roofing. This windowless barn showcases a unique architectural feature: a wide gabled transept that spans the width of the structure, positioned approximately two-thirds towards the rear. This design allows for the convenient passage of horse-drawn vehicles, enabling them to load and unload cargo and exit on the opposite side without needing to turn around. Erected in 1891, the barn remains in robust structural condition, exhibiting no signs of sagging or leaning. Its roof is covered with galvanized sheet metal, a roofing material installed in the early 1950s. Over time, several gaps, primarily caused by storms, have developed, leaving certain sections of the barn exposed to the elements. Furthermore, some areas of the roof have become detached at the edges. In the rear north end of the building, there is a partitioned space measuring 25 ft (7.6 m) by 56 ft (17 m), featuring a wooden floor. Historically, this area was used for the storage of dried fruit and served as temporary accommodations for seasonal laborers.

The barn's exterior is clad in redwood vertical boards, ranging from 9 ft (2.7 m) to 11 ft (3.4 m) in height and 9 inches (230 mm) to 11 inches (280 mm) in width. These boards are secured with 1 inch (25 mm) to 2 1/2 inches (64 mm) fir strips as battens. The boards bear distinct curved marks, which are characteristic of lumber that was rough-milled using a steam-powered circular saw.

== Historical significance ==
The Miller Red Barn was placed on the National Register of Historic Places on September 26, 2016. This barn holds historical significance under Criterion A within the field of agriculture due to its integral role in the production of prunes, apricots, and wine grapes in the southern region of Santa Clara County, California. It is closely associated with Henry Miller, a partner in the San Francisco-based cattle-raising and meat-packing firm of Miller & Lux. The timeframe of significance spans from 1891 when the barn was constructed to support the cultivation and harvesting of fruit trees and grapevines, concluding in 1941 when the Glen Ranch, including the barn, was sold as part of the Henry Miller estate.

== See also ==
- National Register of Historic Places listings in Santa Clara County, California
