= San Joaquin River =

Longest river of Central California, United States

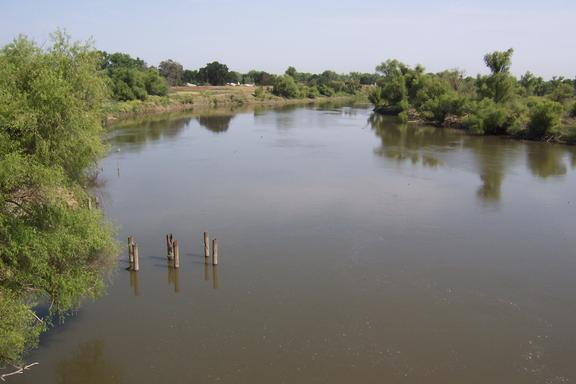
- San Joaquin River near Vernalis

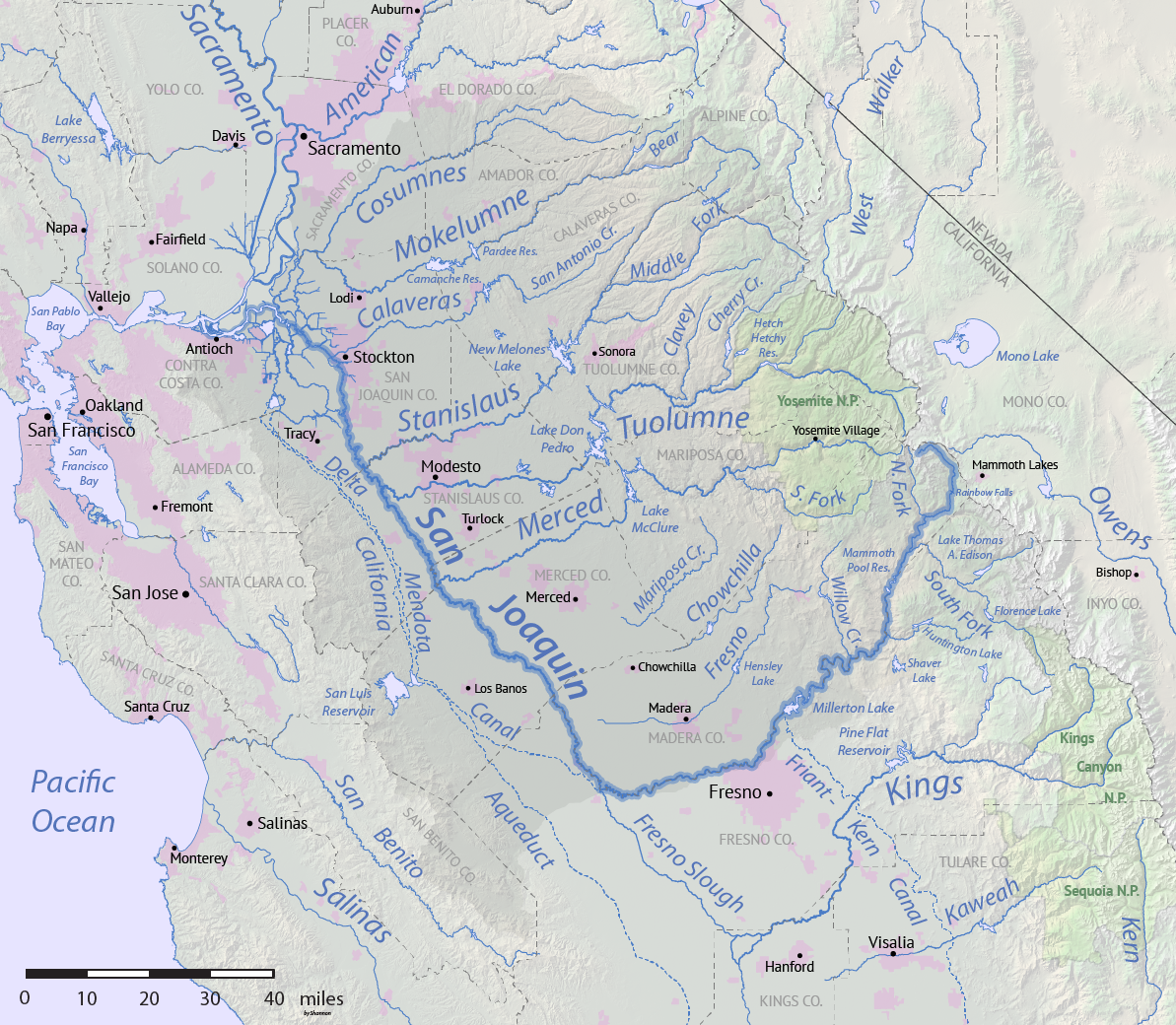
- Map of the San Joaquin River watershed
- Etymology: c. 1805–1808 by Gabriel Moraga for Saint Joachim, father of Mary, the mother of Jesus
- Native name: Río San Joaquín (Spanish)

Location
- Country: United States
- State: California
- Cities: Fresno, Modesto, Stockton

Physical characteristics
- Source: Thousand Island Lake
  - location: Ansel Adams Wilderness, Sierra Nevada
  - coordinates: 37°43′41″N 119°10′09″W
  - elevation: 9,839 ft (2,999 m)
- Mouth: Suisun Bay
  - location: Sacramento, Contra Costa, Solano Counties
  - coordinates: 38°04′00″N 121°51′04″W
  - elevation: 0 ft (0 m)
- Length: 366 mi (589 km)
- Basin size: 15,600 sq mi (40,000 km^{2})
- Discharge
  - location: Vernalis, 78 mi (126 km) from the mouth
  - average: 5,110 cu ft/s (145 m^{3}/s)
  - minimum: 30 cu ft/s (0.85 m^{3}/s)
  - maximum: 325,000 cu ft/s (9,200 m^{3}/s)

Basin features
- Tributaries
  - left: Fresno Slough
  - right: Merced River, Tuolumne River, Stanislaus River, Mokelumne River, Cosumnes River

The San Joaquin River (/ˌsæn hwɑːˈkiːn/ SAN whah-KEEN; Spanish: Río San Joaquín [ˈri.o saŋ xoaˈkin]) is the longest river of Central California. The 366-mile (589 km) long river starts in the high Sierra Nevada and flows through the rich agricultural region of the northern San Joaquin Valley before reaching Suisun Bay, San Francisco Bay, and the Pacific Ocean. An important source of irrigation water as well as a wildlife corridor, the San Joaquin is among the most heavily dammed and diverted of California's rivers.

People have inhabited the San Joaquin Valley for more than 8,000 years, and it was one of the major population centers of pre-Columbian California. Starting in the late 18th century, successive waves of explorers then settlers, mainly Spanish and American, emigrated to the San Joaquin basin. When Spain colonized the area, they sent soldiers from Mexico, who were usually of mixed native Mexican and Spanish birth, led by Spanish officers. Franciscan missionaries from Spain came with expeditions to evangelize the natives by teaching them about the Catholic faith.

Once an inland sea, most of the San Joaquin Valley has a very uniform topography, and much of the lower river formed a huge flood basin. In the 20th century, many levees and dams were built on the San Joaquin and all of its major tributaries. These engineering works changed the fluctuating nature of the river forever and cut off the Tulare Basin from the rest of the San Joaquin watershed. Once a habitat for hundreds of thousands of spawning salmon and millions of migratory birds, today the river is subject to tremendous water supply, navigation, and regulation works by various federal agencies, which have dramatically reduced the flow of the river since the 20th century.

== Name ==
The river was called many different names; at times different parts of the river were known by different names. The southern Yokuts called the river, Tihshachu (Tih-shah-choo), meaning salmon-spearing place. The present name of the river dates to 1805–1808, when Spanish explorer Gabriel Moraga was surveying east from Mission San José in order to find possible sites for a mission. Moraga named a tributary of the river (it is not known which one) for Saint Joachim, husband of Saint Anne and father of Mary, the mother of Jesus. The name Moraga chose was later applied to the entire river; it was in common use by 1810.

In 1827, Jedediah Smith wrote in his journal that an unknown group of Native Americans called the river the Peticutry, a name which is listed as a variant in the U.S. Geological Survey (USGS) Geographic Names Information System.

In the Mono language, the river is called typici h huu', which means "important or great river."

An earlier name for the lower section of the San Joaquin was Rio de San Francisco, which was the name Father Juan Crespí gave to the river he could see entering the Sacramento-San Joaquin Delta from the south. A member of the Pedro Fages party in 1772, Crespi's vantage point was the hilltops behind modern Antioch. Another early name was Rio San Juan Bautista, the origin of which is unknown.

== Course ==
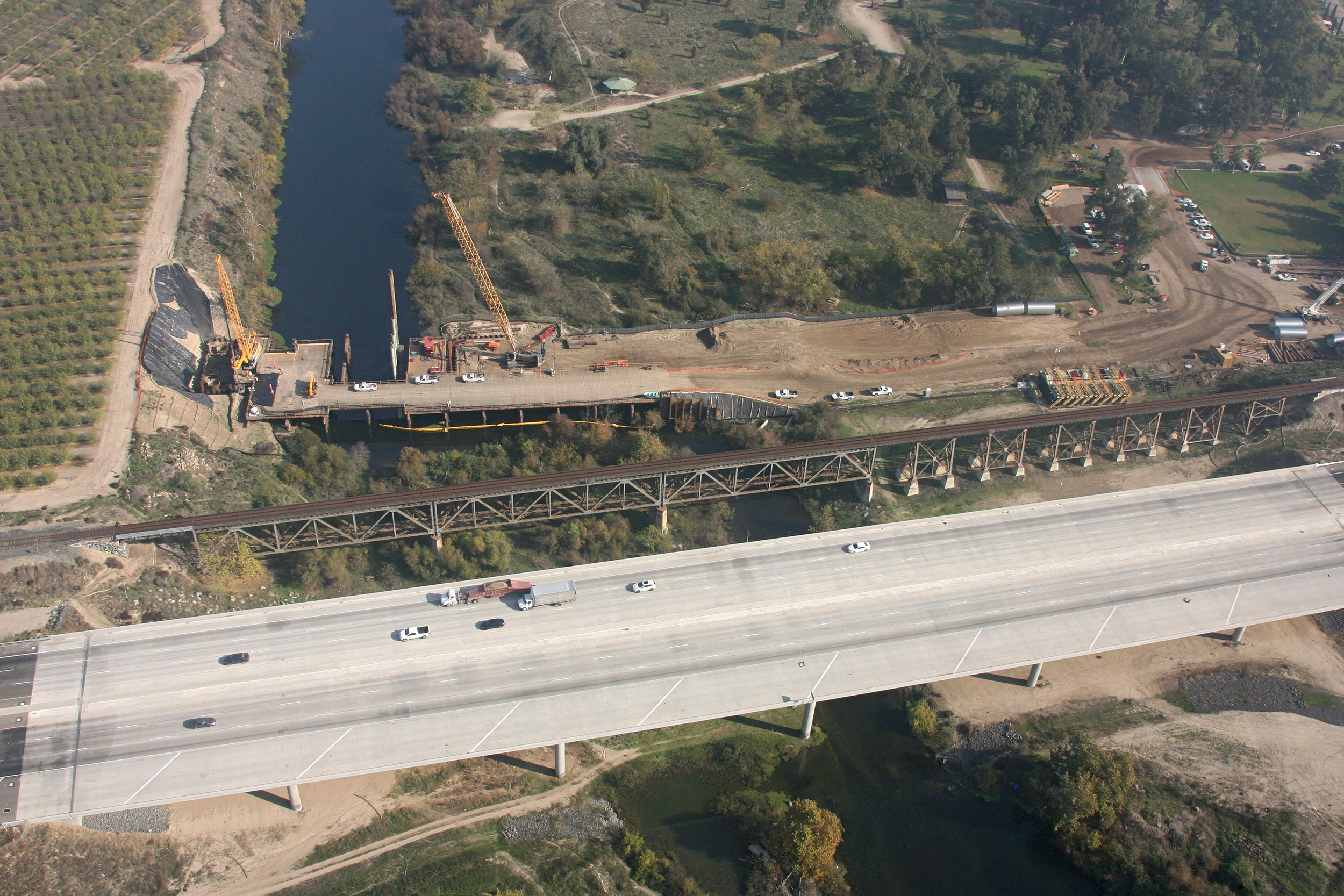
Crossings of California State Route 99 and the Union Pacific Railroad along the northern border of Fresno. The early stages of construction of California High-Speed Rail's San Joaquin River Viaduct is also visible.

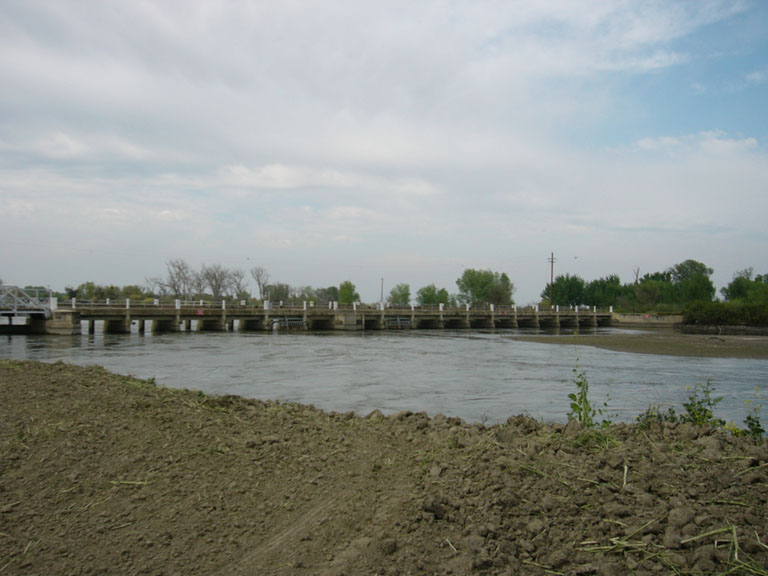
The San Joaquin at Mendota Pool during the high flows of April 2006

The river's source is located in the Ansel Adams Wilderness, in the south-central Sierra Nevada at the confluence of three major affluents: the Middle Fork, which rises from Thousand Island Lake at almost 10,000 ft (3,000 m) above sea level, meets the North Fork, which starts 1.8 mi (2.9 km) southeast of Mount Lyell, and the South Fork, which begins at Martha Lake in Kings Canyon National Park and flows through Florence Lake, joins a short distance downstream. The Middle Fork is considered the largest of the three forks. From the mountainous alpine headwaters, the San Joaquin flows generally south into the foothills of the Sierra, passing through four hydroelectric dams. It eventually emerges from the foothills at what was once the town of Millerton, the location of Friant Dam since 1942, which forms Millerton Lake.

Below Friant Dam (RM267), the San Joaquin flows west-southwest out into the San Joaquin Valley – the southern part of the Great Central Valley – passing north of Fresno. With most of its water diverted into aqueducts, the river frequently runs dry in a 150-mile section. This lack of riverwater begins in the 60 mi (97 km) between Friant Dam and Mendota, where it is only replenished by the Delta-Mendota Canal (RM 205) and the Fresno Slough, when the Kings River is flooding. From Mendota, the San Joaquin swings northwest, passing through many different channels, some natural and some man-made. Northeast of Dos Palos, it is only joined by the Fresno and Chowchilla Rivers when they reach flood stage. Fifty miles (80 km) downstream, the Merced River empties into an otherwise dry San Joaquin (RM118).

The majority of the river flows through quiet agricultural bottom lands, and as a result its meandering course manages to avoid most of the urban areas and cities in the San Joaquin Valley. About 11 mi (18 km) west of Modesto, the San Joaquin meets its largest tributary, the Tuolumne. Near Vernalis, it is joined by another major tributary, the Stanislaus River. The river passes between Manteca and Tracy, where a pair of distributaries – the Old River and Middle River – split off from the main stem just above the Sacramento-San Joaquin Delta, a huge inverted river delta formed by sediment deposits of the Sacramento and San Joaquin Rivers.

About 40 mi (64 km) from the mouth, the river draws abreast to the western flank of Stockton, one of the basin's largest cities. From here to the mouth, the river is dredged as part of a navigation project, the Stockton Deep Water Ship Channel. Past the head of tide, amid the many islands of the delta, the San Joaquin is joined by two more tributaries: the Calaveras River and the larger Mokelumne. The river grows to almost 5,000 ft (1,500 m) wide before ending at its confluence with the Sacramento River, in Antioch, forming the head of Suisun Bay. The combined waters from the two rivers then flow west through the Carquinez Strait and San Francisco Bay into the Pacific.

=== Discharge ===
The natural annual discharge of the San Joaquin before agricultural development is believed to have been between 6–7.9 million acre feet (7.4–9.7 million m^{3}), equaling a flow of roughly 8,300 to 10,900 cu ft/s (240 to 310 m^{3}/s). Some early estimates even range as high as 14 million acre-feet (17.3 million m^{3}), or more than 19,300 cu ft/s (550 m^{3}/s). The numerous tributaries of the San Joaquin – the Fresno, Chowchilla, Merced, Tuolumne, Mariposa Creek, Calaveras, Mokelumne, and others – flowed freely across alluvial flood plains to join the river. All of the major tributaries of the river originate in the Sierra Nevada; most of the streams that start in the Coast Range are intermittent, and contribute little to the flow of the San Joaquin. During the winter, spring, and early summer, storms and snowmelt swell the river; in 1914 – before the development of major dams and irrigation diversions – the California Department of Engineering estimated the river's flow in full flood at 325,000 cu ft/s (9,200 m^{3}/s). In late summer and autumn, there is little water left over to replenish stream flow. Historically, groundwater seepage from Tulare Lake maintained a significant base flow in the river during the dry months – some accounts suggest over 50 percent.

The present conditions of the San Joaquin River at Friant Dam, the average discharge was 324 cu ft/s (9.2 m^{3}/s), or 0.234 million acre-feet per year. The highest average discharge between 1941 and 2015 was in 1983 when the discharge was 4,385 cu ft/s (124.2 m^{3}/s), with an average of those years of 879 cu ft/s (24.9 m^{3}/s). The water temperature range from 7°Celsius (44.5 °F) in February 2006 to a high of 22.8 °C (73.0 °F) on Oct 4, 2014. This range is less extreme than the temperatures below Vernalis where the range is from 2°Celsius (35.6 °F)on Dec 26, 1987 to 35.5 °C (95.9 °F) on August 9, 1990. The river typically ends above the Mendota Pool. Larger flows in the fall may make it possible for the river to extend further towards the ocean, but for the last several years, this is a rare occurrence. The water is largely held behind Friant Dam.

The typical monthly flow of the San Joaquin River near the Sack Dam is 0. There have been seepage concerns below this part of the river, so current flows are restricted below the Sack Dam.

The present annual flow of the San Joaquin River near Vernalis is about 5,110 cu ft/s (145 m^{3}/s), or 4.5 million acre-feet (5.6 million m^{3}) per year. According to USGS stream gauge #11303500 at Vernalis, 78 miles (126 km) above Suisun Bay and 2.6 miles (4.2 km) below the mouth of the Stanislaus River, the average discharge of the San Joaquin River between 1924 and 2011 was 4,525 cu ft/s (128.1 m^{3}/s), or 3.3 million acre-feet (4.0 million m^{3}) per year. The highest recorded annual mean was 21,280 cu ft/s (603 m^{3}/s), 15.4 million acre-feet (19.0 million m^{3}), in 1983, while the lowest was 575 cu ft/s (16.3 m^{3}/s), 416,000 acre-feet (513,000,000 m^{3}), in 1977. The maximum peak flow occurred on December 9, 1950, at 79,000 cu ft/s (2,200 m^{3}/s), and a low flow of 30 cu ft/s (0.85 m^{3}/s) was recorded on August 10, 1961.

San Joaquin River monthly discharges at Vernalis

First row indicates discharge in cuft/s; second row in m^{3}/s
5010	6860	7220	7100	7560	6280	2570	1450	1760	2280	2260	3430
142	194	204.5	201	214	178	73	41	50	64.5	64	97

== Geology ==
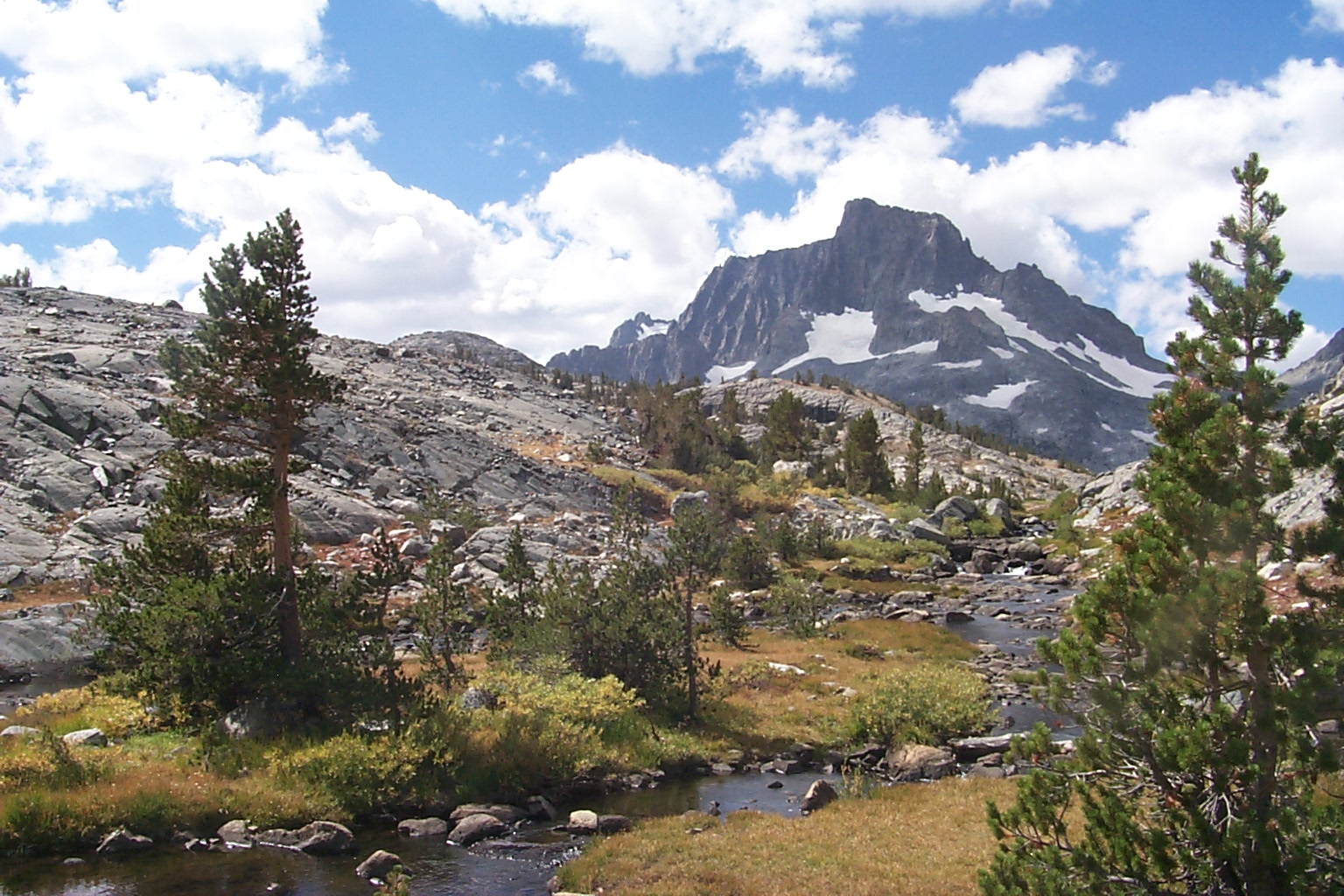
Headwaters of the Middle Fork San Joaquin River, just downstream of Thousand Island Lake

In a geologic context, the San Joaquin River can be divided into two major segments. The upper 97 mi (156 km) above Friant Dam in the Sierra is characterized as a steep-gradient, rocky mountain stream. Over millions of years, the upper San Joaquin, as well as the upper reaches of most of its tributaries, have eroded enormous amounts of rock and sediment from the mountains. Most of the Sierras are underlain by granitic igneous and metamorphic rock dating back to the Mesozoic Era (250–66 MYA); in addition many of the San Joaquin's tributaries flow across a foothills region of metamorphosed volcanic rock more famously known as the Mother Lode Gold Belt.

The 268 mi (431 km) lower part of the river, in sharp contrast, is a meandering stream flowing over Cenozoic alluvial deposits (66 MYA-present), which together comprise the flat floor of the Central Valley. The tremendous volume of sediments that underlie the lower San Joaquin River range from 6 to 9.5 mi (9.7 to 15.3 km) deep, with distance to bedrock generally increasing in a northerly direction. Prior to the uplift of the California Coast Ranges, more than 20,000 ft (6,100 m) of sediments were deposited at the foot of the Sierras by tidal activity, and the ancestral San Joaquin and its tributaries flowed west over this alluvial plain to the sea, dumping their own sediments onto the marine deposits. Compressional forces along the boundary of the North American and Pacific Plates between 2–4 MYA resulted in the uplift of the Coast Ranges, creating an enclosed basin today known as the Central Valley and resulted in the San Joaquin's present path to the sea.

Because of its highly permeable nature, the San Joaquin River's valley is underlain by one of the largest aquifers in the Western United States. The aquifer underlying the San Joaquin River and Tulare Basin is estimated to hold nearly 686,000,000 acre⋅ft (846,000,000 dam^{3}) of water, of which about half can be pumped economically or is clean enough for human use. (Note: The Central Valley as a whole contains 800,000,000 acre⋅ft (990,000,000 dam^{3}) of groundwater. Of this, 114,000,000 acre⋅ft (141,000,000 dam^{3}) are in the Sacramento Valley. The remaining 686,000,000 acre⋅ft (846,000,000 dam^{3}) are in the San Joaquin Valley.) The aquifer receives in excess of 1,600,000 acre⋅ft (2,000,000 dam^{3}) of inflow per year, mostly from precipitation and irrigation water seepage. Concentration of chloride and other minerals generally increases from east to west across the basin.

== History ==
=== Indigenous people ===
Archaeological finds near the southern end of the San Joaquin Valley suggested that humans first arrived in the region as early as 12,000 but no later than 5,000 years ago. The two major ethnic groups were the Miwok people, who inhabited the northern end of the San Joaquin Valley and the Sacramento-San Joaquin Delta region, and the Yokuts tribes, scattered around the more arid southern portion of the basin. During these pre-European times, the San Joaquin River flowed through rich grasslands and sprawling marshes, flooding every few years and transforming much of the valley into lakes. At the southern end of the valley lay the vast Tulare Lake, formerly the largest freshwater lake in the western United States, which connected with the San Joaquin through a series of marshes and sloughs. The rich vegetation and wildlife surrounding these bodies of water made the San Joaquin Valley a favored home as well as a stopping-off place for other nomadic peoples. The native people, mostly hunter-gatherers, lived off this land of abundance; during the 18th century, the population of the San Joaquin Valley was estimated at more than 69,000, representing one of the greatest concentrations of native people anywhere in North America.

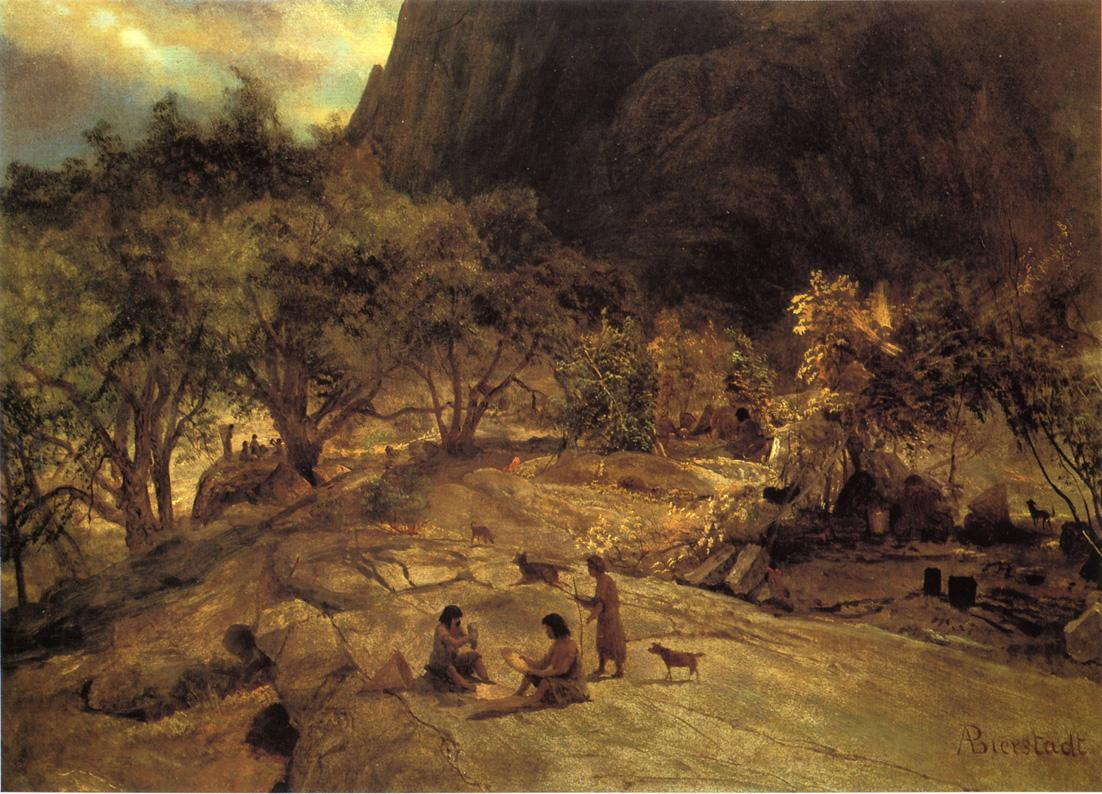
Mariposa Indian Encampment by Albert Bierstadt, c. 1872

Before European colonization, the Yokuts occupied the entire San Joaquin Valley, from the Sacramento-San Joaquin River Delta south to the Tehachapi Mountains, including the adjacent foothills of the Sierra Nevada to the east and parts of the Coast Range to the west. In contrast, the Miwok occupied land deeper within the Sierra Nevada stretching north from the Merced River to the Mokelumne or the American, a tributary of the Sacramento, and west to the Delta region. Most of the Miwok people in the watershed were part of the appropriately named Sierra Miwok group.

The Yokuts were unique among California natives in that they were divided into true tribes. Each had a name, a language, and a territory. Of the about 63 known Yokuts tribes, 33 lived along or around the San Joaquin River and its tributaries. The staple food for San Joaquin Valley inhabitants was the acorn, which when ground, could be made into various foods such as cakes. Grinding the acorns was a simple process where they crushed the nuts using rocks in natural granite depressions. Many of the surviving examples of acorn milling areas can still be found in the foothills, especially around the Kaweah River area.

=== Spanish and Mexican influence ===
The first recorded non-indigenous person to see the San Joaquin River was Don Pedro Fages in 1772. Fages, accompanied by Father Juan Crespí, reached Mount Diablo near Suisun Bay on March 30 and there gazed upon the merging courses of the Sacramento, San Joaquin and Mokelumne Rivers. Another narrative does not mention Fages' name, but does say that Crespí was the one who reached Suisun Bay in 1772. During this visit, Crespí called the San Joaquin River "El Rio de San Francisco", a name that was not used widely due to the river's remoteness but persisted until the early 19th century.

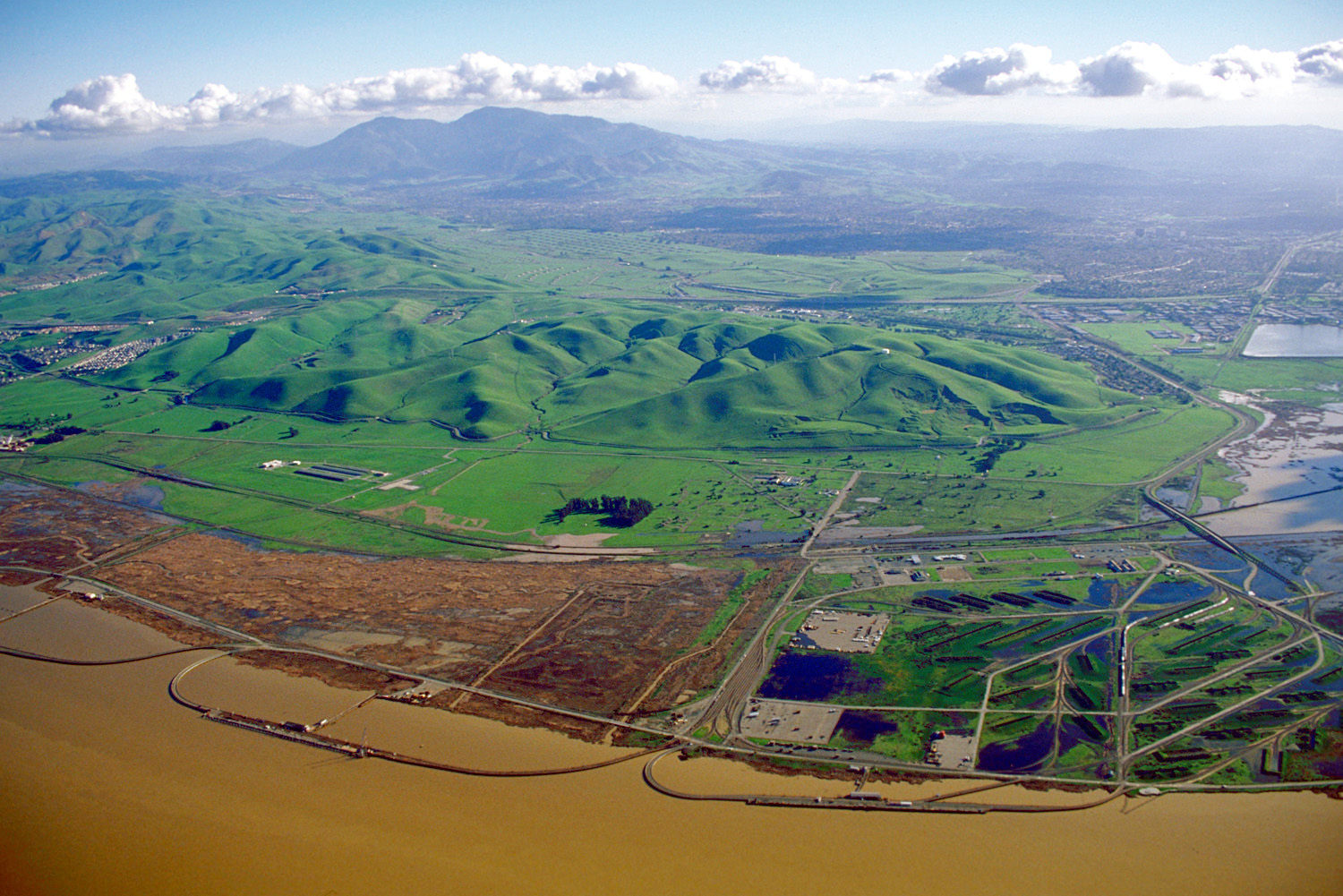
Mount Diablo (background), where Juan Crespí first gazed upon the Sacramento-San Joaquin Delta in 1772, with Suisun Bay in the foreground

In the autumn of 1772 Fages set out from Mission San Luis Obispo de Tolosa in pursuit of deserters from the Spanish army, and traveled east then north over the Tehachapi Mountains through Tejón Pass, which today carries Interstate 5 into the San Joaquin valley. After crossing the mountains, he came upon the shore of Buena Vista Lake at the southern end of the San Joaquin Valley, and gave the name Buena Vista ("beautiful view") to the pass and a nearby Native American village. However, Fages did not venture farther north, and thus did not further explore the main stem of the San Joaquin River.

The San Joaquin River region remained largely unknown except for the fact of its existence until 1806, when Spanish explorer Gabriel Moraga led the first of several subsequent expeditions into the Central Valley, in order to find potential mission sites. Moraga started out from Mission San Juan Bautista, in present-day San Benito County, on September 21 of that year and traveled east into the San Joaquin Valley. The group skirted the western foothills of the Sierra and christened many place names that remain in use today. In 1807 and 1808, Moraga set out again to the San Joaquin Valley. It was during one of these expeditions that he gave the river its present name, after St. Joachim. He also gave names to many tributaries of the river, such as the Merced River (El Río de Nuestra Señora de Merced, "River of our Lady of Mercy").

Relations between the Spanish and the Native Americans in the earlier expeditions to the valley were initially friendly, and the indigenous people began to grow accustomed to the Spanish that later came to the San Joaquin River region. As early as the 1807 Moraga expedition, it was reported that some natives were hostile and attempting to steal their horses. Indeed, when the natives began to rustle cattle and horses for food, the Spanish retaliated by burning camps and villages. Such conflict created enormous cultural loss, and violence continually escalated between the two sides, with no apparent end in sight.

California became part of Mexico in 1821. The new government secularized the Spanish missions and as a result the conversos in the missions were no longer protected by the missionaries from exploitation. The Mexican government began to tax the missions excessively. From 1820, El Camino Viejo, a route between Los Angeles and the San Francisco Bay along the west side of the San Joaquin Valley, brought settlements from the United States into the valley. During Mexican rule, the mission lands in the San Joaquin Valley were subdivided to wealthy landowners (rancheros). The mission lands that were supposed to be given to the natives were also fraudulently taken over by American settlers. A famous leader of the natives was the Yokuts Estanislao, who led revolts against the Mexicans in the late 1820s until finally defeated in 1829 on the Stanislaus River, which bears his name today.

=== Early American era ===
First landing place of sailing launch Comet
- Location where the Comet, the first known sail launch to ascend the San Joaquin River from San Francisco, landed in 1846 San Joaquin River (the United States)
- 37.787°N 121.305°W
- Location: 19000 S. Manthey Road, Lathrop, California

History
- Built: 1846

California Historical Landmark
- Designated: June 2, 1949
- Reference no.: 437

The first American known to see the San Joaquin River was likely Jedediah Smith, a renowned mountain man, fur trapper and explorer. In 1826, Smith arrived in Mission San Gabriel Arcángel, California, when the region was under control of the Mexican government. As this was in violation of a law which prevented foreigners from entering California, and he could have been arrested for spying, he traveled north into the San Joaquin Valley, searching for populations of beaver. Smith noted the fertility and natural beauty of the area, and the apparent peace of the Native Americans living in the villages he passed. His expedition then turned east in an attempt to cross the Sierra Nevada. They tried to summit the range by way of both the Kings River and the American River (a tributary of the Sacramento), but it was early spring and the snow was too deep. They crossed the mountains along the Stanislaus River canyon, becoming the first recorded whites to cross the Sierra Nevada on foot. It is still disputed over whether Smith's party discovered gold on the San Joaquin or one of its tributaries. Although some of his men confirmed it, Smith did not make any mention in his journal.

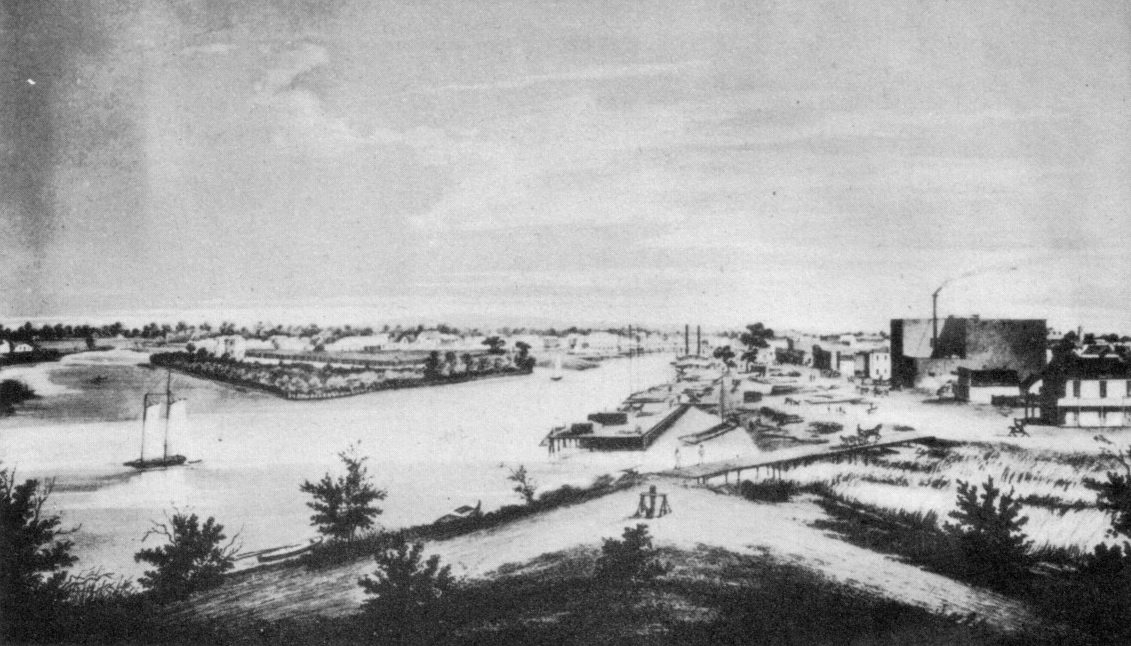
Stockton, on the lower San Joaquin River, circa 1860, with the river to the left

In the early 1830s, a few fur trappers from the Pacific Northwest exploring southwards into the San Joaquin Valley saw an epidemic of smallpox and malaria brought unintentionally by the Europeans that had swept down the San Joaquin River corridor during the summer of 1833, killing between 50 and 75 percent of the entire native population in the valley. The outbreak continued year after year with diminishing acuteness until about 50,000–60,000 indigenous people were dead. Explorer Kit Carson noted in 1839 that "... cholera or some other fearful scourge broke out among them and raged with such fearful fatality that they were unable either to bury or burn their dead, and the air was filled with the stench of their decaying bodies."

During the time Mexico was in control of California, the San Joaquin River region was only sparsely populated, and used almost exclusively for cattle ranching. When California won independence from Mexico in 1846, becoming part of the United States the following month, a flood of American settlers descended upon the valley. Just a year before, Benjamin Davis Wilson "drove a herd of cattle from his Riverside rancho through the San Joaquin Valley to Stockton and reported seeing not a single white man". After the Americans took over, emigrants began trickling in increased numbers, establishing the towns of Kingston City, Millerton, and Fresno City. The newcomers also included a group of Mormons led by Samuel Brannan, who sailed aboard the Comet to establish a settlement at the confluence of the San Joaquin and the Stanislaus called "New Hope" (later Stanislaus City).

The real influx came in 1848, when a gold strike on the American set off the California Gold Rush. Within one year, the population of the San Joaquin Valley increased by more than 80,000. The city of Stockton, on the lower San Joaquin, quickly grew from a sleepy backwater to a thriving trading center, the stopping-off point for miners headed to the gold fields in the foothills of the Sierra. Rough ways such as the Millerton Road which later became the Stockton - Los Angeles Road quickly extended the length of the valley, some following old cattle routes and Native American trails, and were served by mule teams and covered wagons. Riverboat navigation quickly became an important transportation link on the San Joaquin River, and during the "June Rise", as boat operators called the San Joaquin's annual high water levels during snowmelt, large craft could make it as far upstream as Fresno. During the peak years of the gold rush, the river in the Stockton area was reportedly crowded with hundreds of abandoned oceangoing craft, whose crew had deserted for the gold fields. The multitude of idle ships was such a blockade that at several occasions they were burned just to clear a way for riverboat traffic.

=== Irrigation era ===
Although the gold rush attracted tens of thousands of newcomers to the San Joaquin River area, deposits of the precious mineral petered out within a few years, especially on the upper reaches of the San Joaquin and its tributaries which were only suitable for placer mining. Many of these people settled in the San Joaquin Valley, most in the existing towns such as Stockton, Fresno and Bakersfield but some establishing new settlements. These included San Joaquin City, near the confluence of the San Joaquin with the Stanislaus, probably the largest of these post-gold-rush boomtowns. Established in 1851, the town maintained considerable size until 1880, when trade competition from nearby Stockton caused it to diminish. Another notable but much smaller settlement was Las Juntas, near present-day Mendota. This was a haven for criminals and fugitives, and was frequented by the infamous bandits Joaquín Murrieta and Tiburcio Vásquez.

It was in the mid-1860s that the San Joaquin River and its surrounds underwent a substantial change: the introduction of irrigated agriculture. As early as 1863, small irrigation canals were built in the Centerville area, southeast of Fresno, but were destroyed in subsequent floods. The vulnerability of the small local infrastructure led to the establishment of irrigation districts, which were formed to construct and maintain canals in certain areas of the valley. One of the first was the Robla Canal Company in the Merced River area, which went into operation in March 1876, but was soon surpassed by the Farmers Canal Company. The district built a diversion dam on the Merced, sending its water into a pair of canals still in use today.

One of the most powerful early irrigation empires was the Kern County Land and Water Company, established in 1873 by land speculator James Ben Ali Haggin, which grew to supply over 400,000 acres (160,000 ha) through their canal system. Haggin soon ran into conflicts with other landowners over riparian water rights, as the larger districts, including his, had more financial reserves and engineering expertise, and were the first to build dams and diversions on a large scale. This resulted in the drying out of streams and rivers before they reached downstream users and sparked conflict over how much water could be allotted to whom. In Haggin's case, his company ran into problems with the Miller & Lux Corporation, run by Henry Miller and Charles Lux, who owned more than 1,000,000 acres (400,000 ha) throughout the San Joaquin Valley, Tulare Basin, and other regions of California. The court battle that resulted would change water laws and rights in the San Joaquin River valley, and ended up promoting large-scale agribusiness over small farmers.

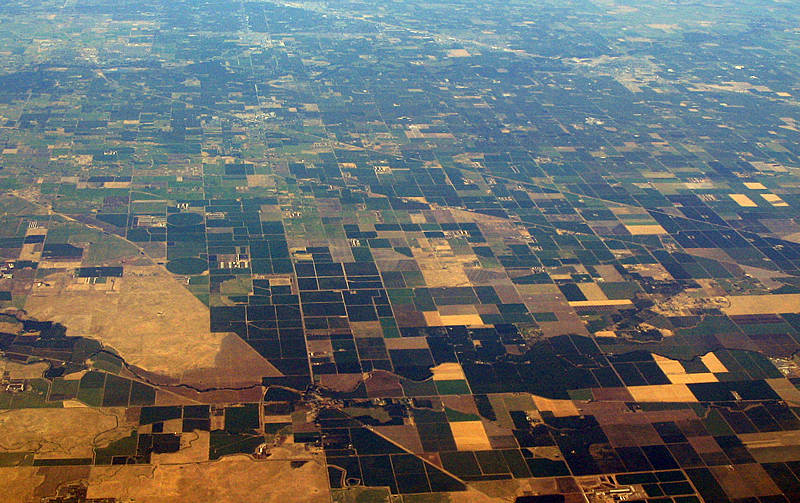
An example of heavily irrigated farmland in the northern San Joaquin Valley, near Tracy and Manteca

Miller and Lux were not any newer to the San Joaquin Valley than had been Haggin, but were the driving influence on valley agribusiness until well into the early 20th century. The corporation had begun acquiring land in the valley in 1858, eventually holding sway over an enormous swath reaching from the Kern River in the south to the Chowchilla River in the north. Much of the land that Miller and Lux acquired was swamp and marsh, which was considered virtually worthless. However, with their huge capital, they could afford to drain thousands of acres of it, beginning an enormous environmental change that eventually resulted in the loss of over 95 percent of the wetlands adjoining the San Joaquin River and Tulare Basin.

Henry Miller exercised enormous political power in the state, and most San Joaquin Valley inhabitants either were avid supporters of him or despised him. When Miller died in 1916, his company owned 900,000 acres (360,000 ha) in the San Joaquin Valley alone with hundreds of miles of well-developed, maintained irrigation canals. As said by Tom Mott, the son of Miller and Lux' irrigation superintendent, "Miller realized you couldn't do anything with the land unless you had the water to go with it. Perhaps more than any other person, Miller had more of a lasting impact on the San Joaquin River than any other individual."

By the early 20th century, so much water was being diverted off the San Joaquin River and its tributaries that the river was no longer suitable for navigational purposes. As a result, commercial navigation began a decline starting in the late 19th century and was completely gone by 1911. With over 350,000 acres (140,000 ha) under irrigation along the river by 1900 – this figure has only grown hugely since then – the river and its tributaries became much narrower, siltier and shallower, with large consequences for the natural environment, for sustainability of water supplies in its valley, and also huge changes for water politics in the state. The San Joaquin and its tributaries seemed to give rise to just about every single possible argument over water, including such cases as "When is a river not a river?" referring to the difference between a slough and a marsh. It has been said that fights over the river have caused "some of the most bitter and longest running lawsuits ever to clog the courts. Arguably, it is the most litigated river in America."

== Dams, diversions and engineering ==
=== Hydroelectric development in the early 1900s ===
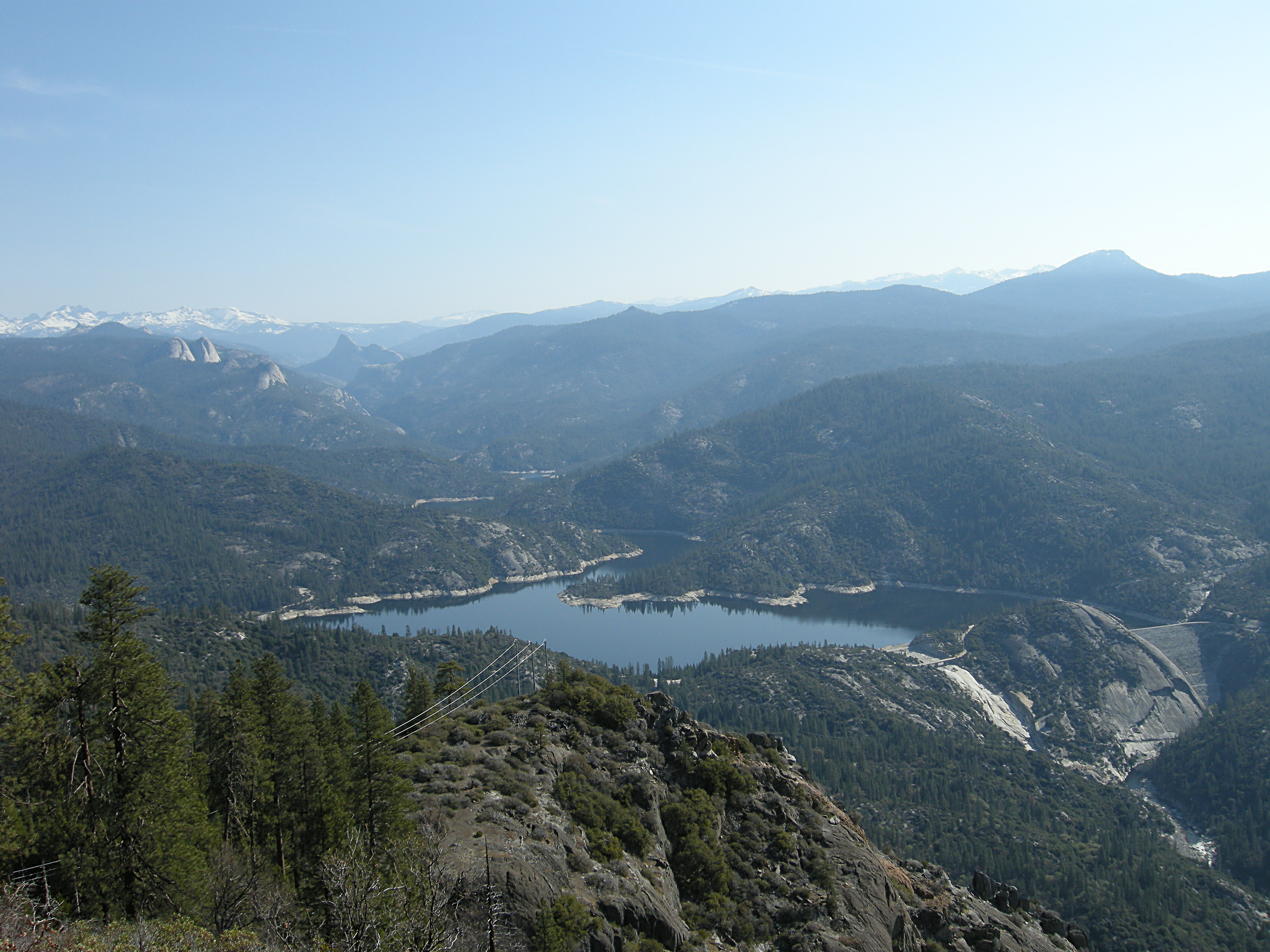
Mammoth Pool Dam, the principal dam of the Big Creek Hydroelectric Project, completed in 1959

By the early 20th century, Californian cities as far south as Los Angeles were looking to new sources for electricity because of their rapidly growing populations and industries. Two visionaries, railroad baron Henry E. Huntington and engineer John S. Eastwood established a fledgling power company in 1902 today known as Southern California Edison, and acquired water rights to the upper San Joaquin River from the Miller and Lux Corporation. During that year, Huntington and Eastwood devised plans to utilize the water of the San Joaquin River and some of its headwaters tributaries in what would become one of the most extensive hydroelectric systems in the world, known as the Big Creek Hydroelectric Project.

Construction of the system's facilities, which included Mammoth Pool and Redinger Dams on the San Joaquin and four additional reservoirs on its tributaries with a total storage capacity of 560,000 acre⋅ft (690,000 dam^{3}), started in 1911. A total of eight dams and tunnels, the longest of which stretches 21,600 ft (6,600 m), and nine powerhouses with a total installed capacity of 1,014 MW were built in stages spanning the 20th century, with the last powerhouse coming on line in 1987. The consistent use and reuse of the waters of the San Joaquin River, its South Fork, and the namesake of the project, Big Creek, over a vertical drop of 6,200 ft (1,900 m), have over the years inspired a nickname, "The Hardest Working Water in the World".

Early 1900s hydroelectric development in the upper San Joaquin River basin was not limited to Southern California Edison. In 1910, the San Joaquin Electric Company built a dam on Willow Creek, a tributary of the San Joaquin River, forming Bass Lake as part of the Crane Valley hydroelectric project. Water from Bass Lake was diverted to a powerhouse on the San Joaquin River beginning in 1917, and two more powerhouses were added in 1919, increasing the total generating capacity to about 28 MW. The Crane Valley project and San Joaquin Electric was purchased by San Joaquin Light and Power Company in 1909, which was in turn purchased by Pacific Gas and Electric Company (PG&E) in 1936. In 1920, Kerckhoff Dam was completed on the San Joaquin River about 10 mi (16 km) southwest of Big Creek as part of PG&E's Kerckhoff hydroelectric project. The dam initially operated with a capacity of 38 MW in the Kerckhoff No. 1 Powerhouse on Millerton Lake. In 1983, the 155 MW Kerckhoff No. 2 Powerhouse was added, bringing the total capacity to 193 MW.

=== Stockton Ship Channel ===
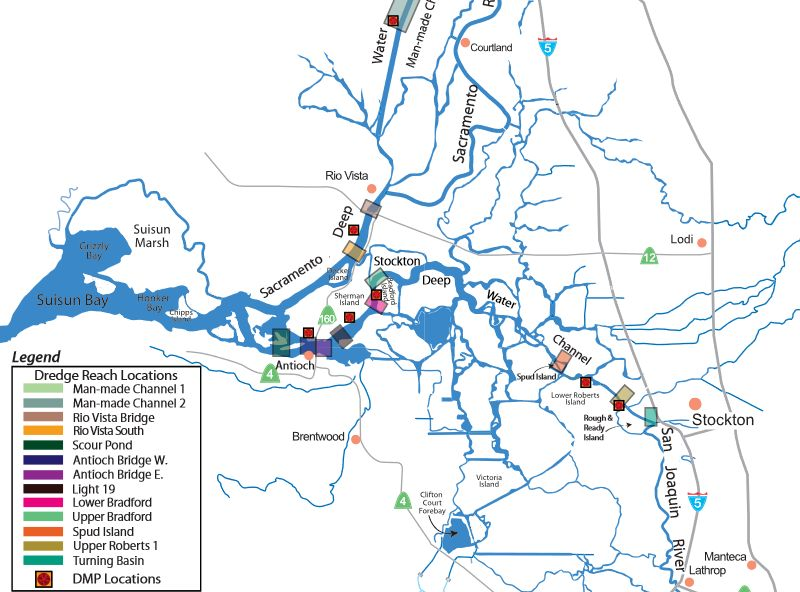
Stockton Deep Water Shipping Channel

The San Joaquin was once navigable by steamboats as far upstream as Fresno, but agricultural diversions have greatly slowed and shallowed the river. This in turn has also caused the river to drop large amounts of silt that formerly washed out to sea in its bed, further reducing the depth. In the late 19th century, the city of Stockton, once an important seaport for the San Joaquin Valley, found itself increasingly landlocked because the San Joaquin River, its main connection to the sea, was rapidly silting up. The early 20th century saw proposals to maintain a minimum depth in the lower river by dredging, but these were interrupted by the onset of World War I. In 1925 the city put forth a $1.3 million bond for dredging the lower San Joaquin from its mouth to the Port of Stockton – a distance of 41 mi (66 km) by river.

In 1926, Stockton pooled its finances with the federal and state governments for a total of $8.2 million. Construction on the channel, which included widening and deepening the riverbed and cutting off meanders and oxbow lakes, began in earnest in 1928. These included major cuts at Hog Island, Venice Island and Mandeville Island, plus five smaller straightening projects. The navigation project shortened the river length by 4 mi (6.4 km) and deepened it to 37 ft (11 m). Additional deepening work was carried out in 1968 and 1982. Today, the navigation channel, known as the Stockton Deep Water Ship Channel, can handle fully loaded vessels of up to 60,000 short tons (120,000,000 lb; 54,000,000 kg) and up to 900 ft (270 m) long. However, the navigation works have unexpectedly led to low dissolved oxygen levels in the lower San Joaquin River, which has hurt fish populations. This is believed to be a result of the combination of the abrupt geometry change from the shallow river upstream of Stockton to the deep water channel, in addition to pollution from the harbor and city and poor tidal mixing.

=== Federal and state projects ===
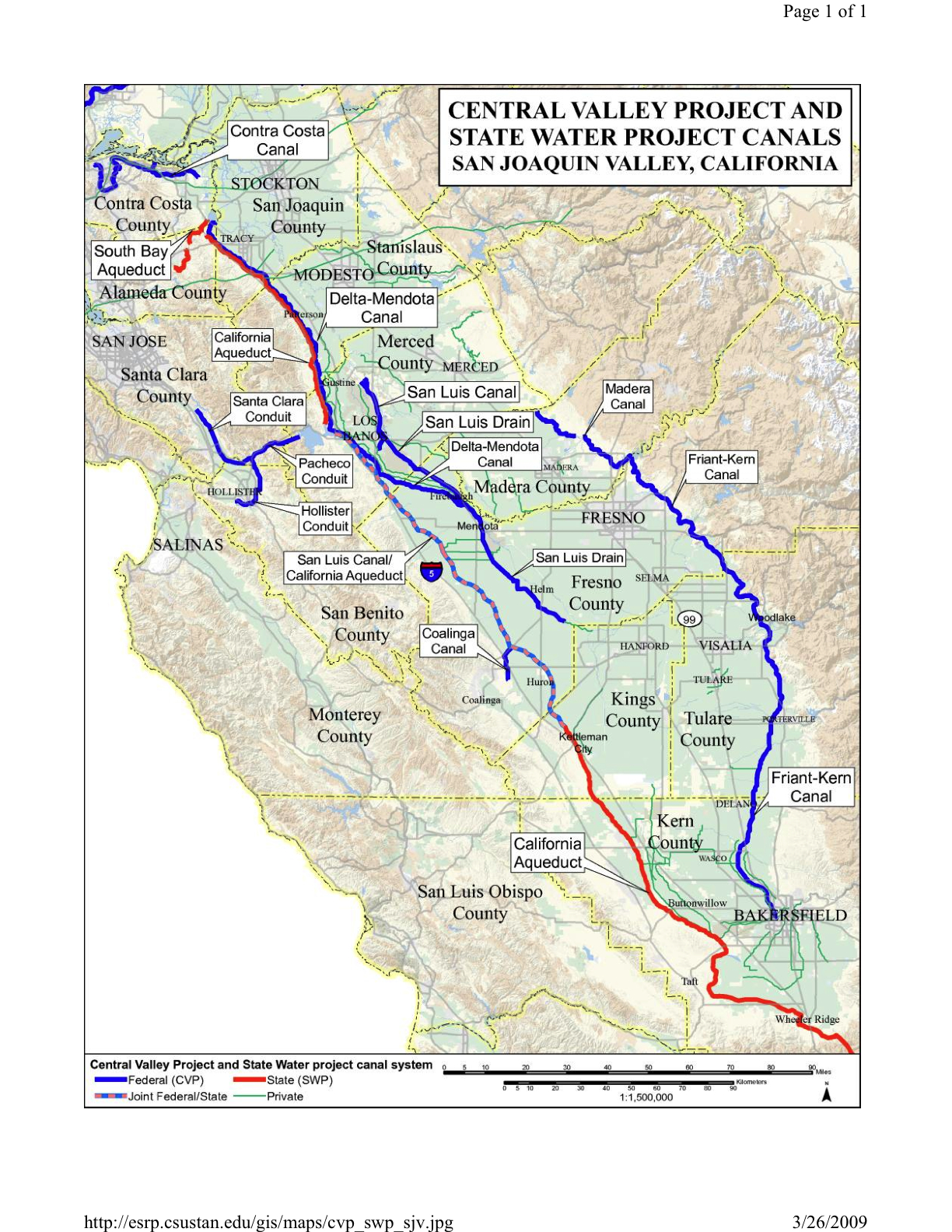
Federal and state canals in the San Joaquin Valley

==== Central Valley Project ====
As early as the 1870s, state and federal agencies were already looking at the Central Valley as an area in need of a large water transport project. In 1931 California's Department of Water Resources came up with the State Water Plan, which entailed the construction of dams and canals to transport water from the Sacramento River to the rapidly dwindling San Joaquin. The project was still in its planning stages when the Great Depression hit the United States, and California was unable to raise the funds necessary for building the various facilities. As a result, the project was transferred to the federal government and switched hands several times between the U.S. Army Corps of Engineers (USACE) and U.S. Bureau of Reclamation (USBR) before finally being authorized in the Rivers and Harbors Act of 1937 as a USBR undertaking and part of the New Deal, a series of large-scale reforms and construction projects intended to provide jobs for the millions of unemployed during the Depression.

Construction of Friant Dam, the main dam on the San Joaquin River, began in 1937 and was completed in 1942. The dam serves for irrigation and flood control storage, but its main purpose is to divert water into the Madera Canal, which runs northwest along the San Joaquin Valley to the Chowchilla River, and the Friant-Kern Canal, which carries San Joaquin water all the way south into the Tulare Basin, terminating at the Kern River. Both are irrigation and municipal supply canals serving primarily agricultural interests. Water from the Friant Dam supplies almost 1,000,000 acres (400,000 ha) of farmland in Fresno, Kern, Madera, and Tulare counties. The diversion of water off the San Joaquin at Friant Dam leaves little more than a trickle below the dam in most years, except for releases serving farms in the immediate area downstream of Friant.

A key point for irrigation water distribution on the San Joaquin, despite its small size, is Mendota Dam. Built in 1871 at the juncture of the San Joaquin River and Fresno Slough, it initially served to divert water into the Main Canal, an irrigation canal for the riverside bottomlands in the San Joaquin Valley. In 1951, Mendota became the terminus of the Delta-Mendota Canal, a USBR project which conveys up to 4,600 cu ft/s (130 m^{3}/s) for 117 mi (188 km) from the mouth of the Sacramento River to the usually dry San Joaquin at that point. Water from Mendota is distributed in two directions: released into the San Joaquin for downstream diversions at the Sack Dam, another small diversion dam; and into Fresno Slough during the dry season, when no water is flowing in from the Kings River. The latter sends water into the Tulare Basin through the natural channel of the slough, which in essence conveys water in either direction depending on the time of year – north into the San Joaquin during the rainy season, south into the Tulare during the dry months.

==== Eastside Bypass ====
"It was a beautiful river that ran clear and cold. In those days it even had a smell of its own; it was a fresh and inviting smell. While something had to be done to control the flooding, it's a damn shame that they had to kill the river in the process."
– Tony Imperatrice, Fresno resident, 1988

Even with the presence of Friant and numerous other flood control dams, large floods still caused significant damage along the San Joaquin River all the way through the late 1950s. The passage of the Flood Control Act of 1944 included provisions for the construction of a levee system along part of the San Joaquin River, but valley farmers were not entirely satisfied. After years of lobbying, farmers convinced the state government to authorize a massive flood-control system of diversion channels and levees whose main component is the Eastside Bypass, so named because of its location east of and parallel to the San Joaquin. Groundbreaking of the huge project was in 1959 and construction was finished in 1966.

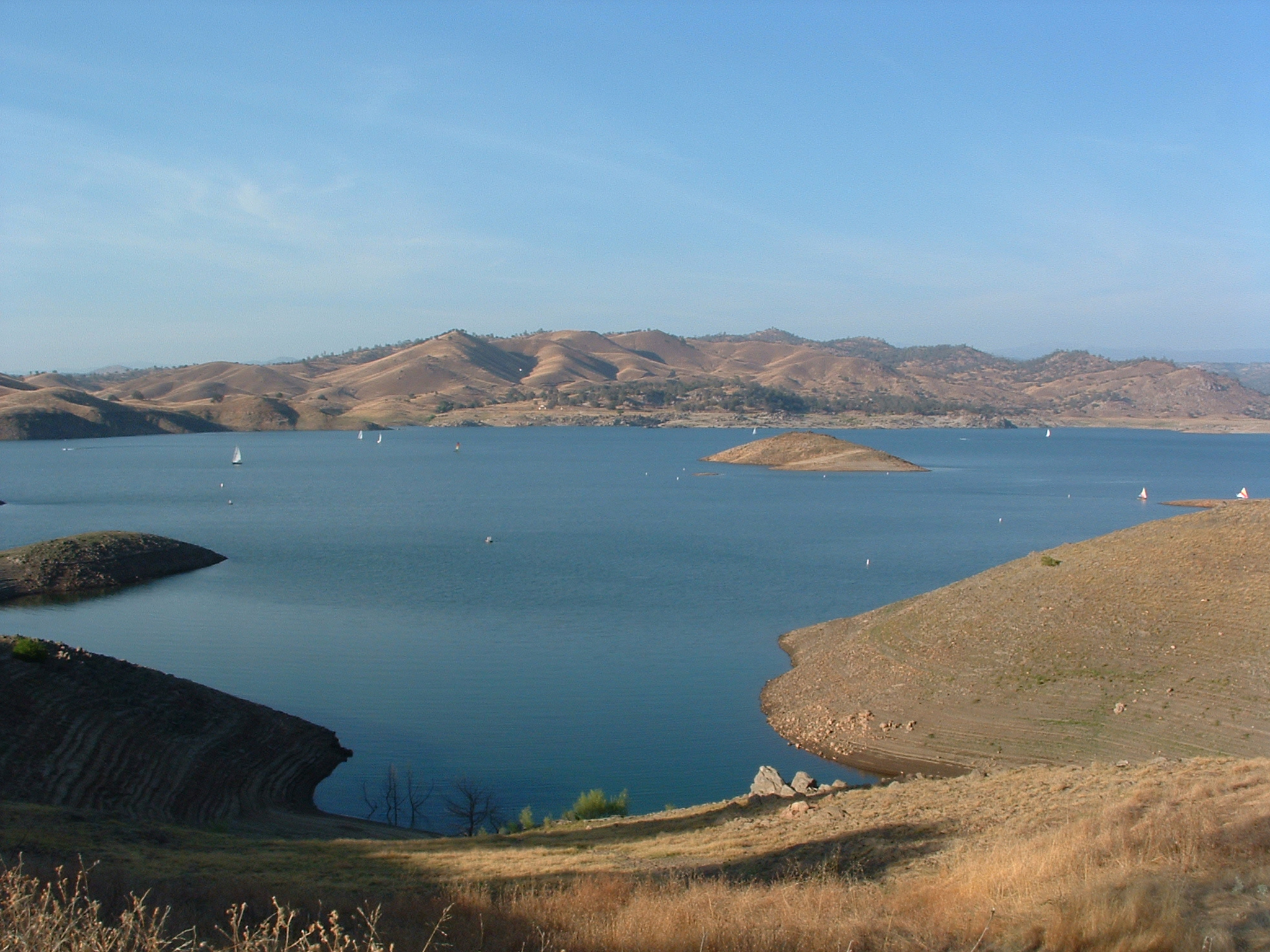
Millerton Lake, the reservoir of Friant Dam and the largest on the San Joaquin mainstem

The bypass system starts with the Chowchilla Canal Bypass, which can divert up to 5,500 cu ft/s (160 m^{3}/s) off the San Joaquin, a few miles above Mendota. After intercepting the flow of the Fresno River, the system is known as the Eastside Bypass, which runs northwest, crossing numerous tributaries: Berenda and Ash Sloughs, the Chowchilla River, Owens Creek and Bear Creek. Near the terminus, the bypass channel has a capacity of roughly 18,500 cu ft/s (520 m^{3}/s). The Eastside Bypass ends just upstream of the Merced River confluence, where the San Joaquin levee system is better designed. However, the levees on the bypass channel are generally more well-built than those on the San Joaquin mainstem and thus the channel of the San Joaquin runs dry in some places where the entire flow has been diverted to the bypass system.

==== Proposed dams ====
Although fairly large with a capacity of 520,500 acre⋅ft (642,000 dam^{3}), Millerton Lake, the reservoir of Friant Dam, is small compared to other reservoirs in the San Joaquin basin, such as Don Pedro and Pine Flat. The Bureau of Reclamation in conjunction with the California Department of Water Resources has proposed the construction of a new dam on the San Joaquin, Temperance Flat Dam, a few miles upstream of Friant. The proposed $1.2-3.5 billion dam would stand 665 ft (203 m) high and create a reservoir of 1,260,000 acre⋅ft (1,550,000 dam^{3}), well over twice the capacity of Millerton Lake. Proponents of the project cite numerous benefits: flood control, increased storage, hydroelectric potential, and capacity to provide a greater flow in the downstream river during the dry season. It would also give dam operators the advantage of being able to maintain the river to a lower temperature due to the reservoir's great depth. The new reservoir would provide an estimated annual yield of 208,000 acre⋅ft (257,000 dam^{3}). In November 2014 the dam received $171 million of state funding from Proposition 1A, though project backers had sought $1 billion in funding.

However, opponents assert that the upper San Joaquin River, which is already controlled by dozens of smaller reservoirs upstream of Millerton Lake, will not provide sufficient discharge to fill the reservoir except in very wet years. The new reservoir would flood 15 mi (24 km) of the San Joaquin River including whitewater runs, fishing areas and historic sites. It would also inundate two Big Creek Hydro powerhouses, causing a potential net loss of electricity generation. There would be significant evaporation losses from the reservoir, and the water required to fill it would put further pressure on already stressed water resources in the San Joaquin River basin.

== Ecology and environment ==
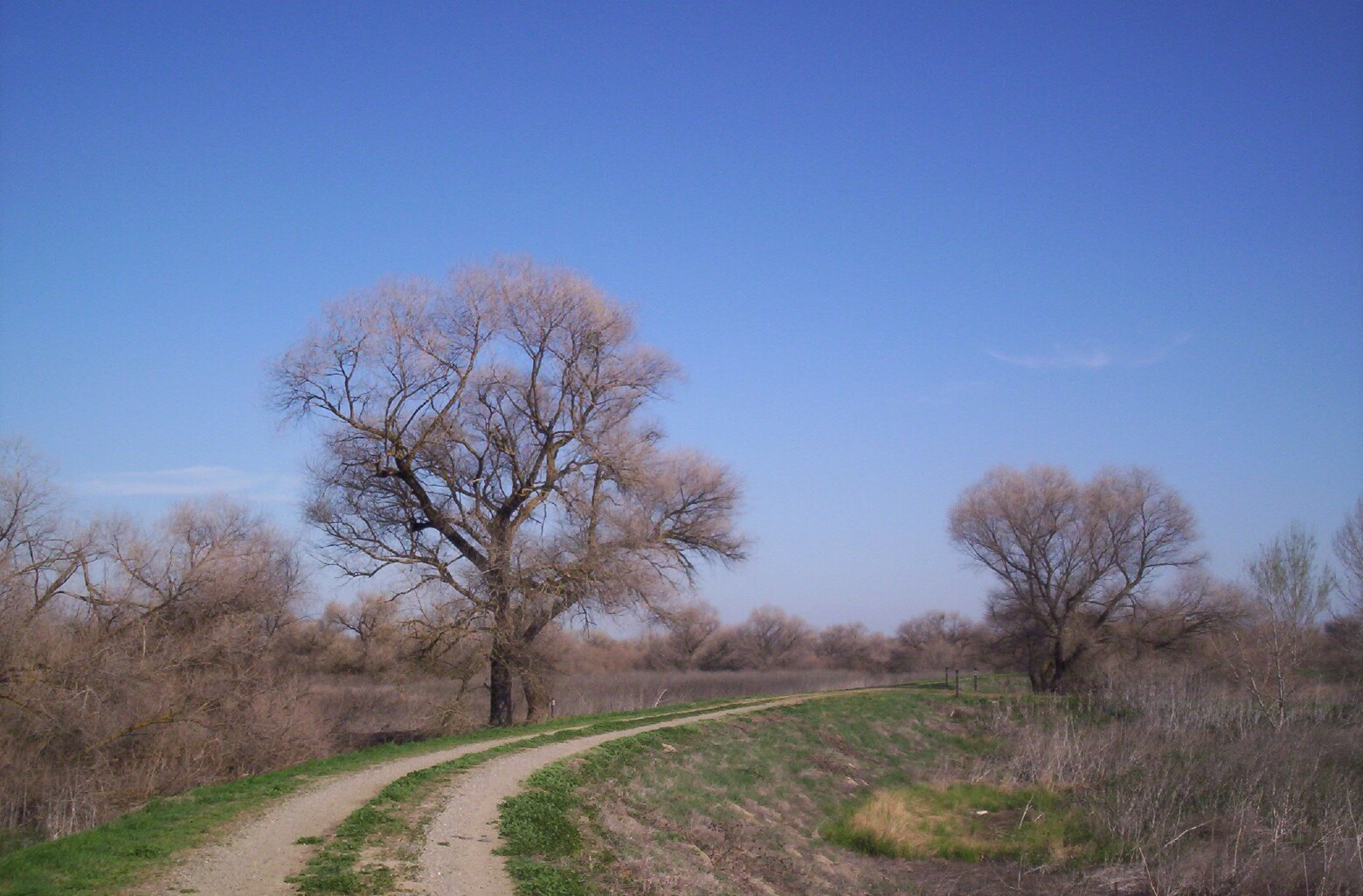
A road in the San Luis National Wildlife Refuge, one of the few remaining wetland areas along the San Joaquin River

Hundreds of years ago, the San Joaquin flowed freely through a grass and marsh-dominated region variously known as the "California prairie", "California annual grassland", or "Central Valley grasslands". It is widely believed that the dominant grass species throughout the San Joaquin River valley and Tulare Basin, as well as the Sacramento Valley, the Sierra foothills and Coast Ranges, was Nassella pulchra, a type of bunchgrass more commonly known as purple needlegrass. Today, this vegetation community exists only in isolated pockets because of development of the valley for agriculture, and in much of the remnant open areas where it once thrived, now grows introduced flora such as annual rye and wild oat. The vegetation communities created by the introduced grasses are sometimes referred to as "valley grassland", which is highly seasonal but is spread throughout the Central Valley from near Redding to south of Bakersfield. These grasses all thrive in the Mediterranean climate that dominates much of the San Joaquin Valley.

The San Joaquin River and its marshes and wetlands provide a critical resting and breeding stop for migratory birds along the Pacific Flyway. Once, the seasonal bird populations in the San Joaquin basin were immense, especially in the now-dry Tulare Lake region: "It took something different, though, to capture the sound of the blue sky as it turned dark and deafening from the wings and cries of millions of native and migratory birds – Canada geese, mallards, swans, pelicans, cranes, teal, and curlews. How to mimic the sudden flight of flocks so immense they extinguished the sun? One of the first white men to camp along the lake could think of only one noise, the roar of a freight train, that compared with the takeoff of the birds." Historically, the grasslands and the fringes of the great marshes and lakes provided habitat for large grazing animals including pronghorn, mule deer and the endemic tule elk, as well as predators such as the San Joaquin kit fox; all of these species have seen dramatic population declines as their native habitat has fallen under the plow.

Human activities have replaced or altered over 95 percent of the historic wetlands as well as the California oak woodland habitat, which originally occurred along stream and river corridors in the foothills, and the tule grass that once thrived in huge stands on the edges of marshes and lakes. Some of the richest remaining marsh habitats are in the Sacramento-San Joaquin Delta, which, despite significant agricultural and infrastructure development, has retained many of its original swamps and backwaters. Before the 19th century, the delta was a region of numerous islands of nutrient-rich peat, alluvial deposits, winding channels and waterways. Since then, most of the Delta islands have been cultivated, and consistent use of the land has resulted in subsidence, in some cases up to 25 ft (7.6 m). Water diversions from the rivers feeding it have increased salinity, which has in turn caused declines in fish populations that once thrived in the region.

As defined by the World Wildlife Fund, the San Joaquin River watershed is part of the Sacramento-San Joaquin freshwater ecoregion, which supports almost 40 species of freshwater fish. These include several types of lampreys, sturgeons, sunfish, perch and various anadromous fish species such as salmon and steelhead. Some of these fish are believed to have descended from fishes of the Columbia Basin in geologically ancient times, when the upper reaches of the Sacramento River watershed were connected with that of the Snake River. Up to 75 percent of the historic species were endemic to the Sacramento-San Joaquin basin. Most native fish stocks have suffered because of predation by introduced species and dam construction. In a study from 1993 to 1995, it was found that the main stem of the San Joaquin River was mainly populated by fathead minnow, red shiner, threadfin shad and inland silverside, all of which were introduced. Downstream portions of the river's main tributaries were populated mainly by largemouth and smallmouth bass, redear sunfish and white catfish, while native species have survived relatively well in the upper reaches of the river and its tributaries, which also play host to introduced brown trout.

=== Pollution ===
For its size, the San Joaquin River is one of the most polluted rivers in the United States, especially in its lower course. Years of pesticides and fertilizers being applied to the surrounding lands as well as municipal runoff have led to elevated levels of selenium, fluoride, nitrates and other substances in the river and its tributaries; pesticide pollution is now considered "ubiquitous" to the San Joaquin River system. The selenium is believed to originate from soils on the west side of the valley and in the Coast Ranges, which are rich with the element. Additionally, the San Joaquin is suffering chronic salinity problems due to high levels of minerals being washed off the land by irrigation practices. Abandoned mines contribute toxic acid mine drainage to some tributaries of the river. One of the worst environmental disasters was at Kesterson Reservoir, a disposal site for agricultural drain water which doubled as a wildlife refuge. Initially, animals and plants thrived in the artificial wetlands that were created here, but in 1983, it was found that birds had suffered severe deformities and deaths due to steadily increasing levels of chemicals and toxins. In the next few years, all the fish species died except for the mosquito fish, and algae blooms proliferated in the foul water. These have had not only an adverse impact on San Joaquin River ecology, but also cause pollution to the sources of most of the large aqueducts in the state – the California and Delta-Mendota Canals, for example.

=== Salmon ===
Before irrigation development, the San Joaquin River and its tributaries once supported the third largest run of Pacific salmon in California, including prodigious spring, summer, fall, and late-fall runs of chinook salmon. The California Department of Fish and Game estimated in the 1930s that the historic salmon run was likely in the vicinity of 200,000 to 500,000 spawners annually, but by the mid-20th century, reduction in river flows led to the run dropping to about 3,000-7,000. Some sources put the historic populations as high as three hundred thousand, but this is highly unlikely because of the limited habitat available in the watershed.

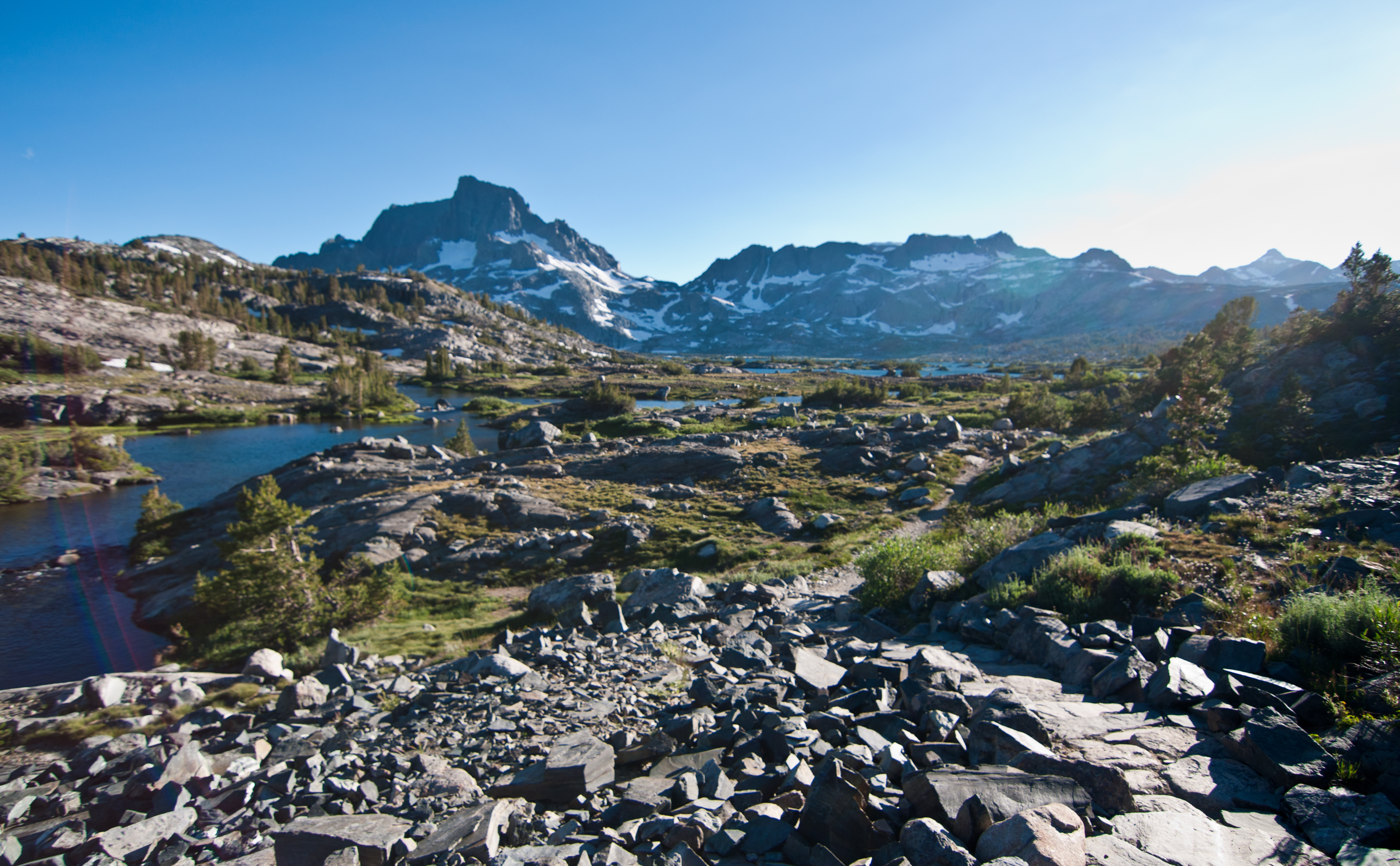
Salmon are now prevented by dams from reaching the headwaters of the San Joaquin River.

Construction of dams in the San Joaquin watershed has led to nearly all of the good spawning streams, located higher in the mountains near the headwaters of the San Joaquin and its tributaries, being cut off to the salmon. The remaining areas left for the salmon to spawn in are undesirable. Prior to the building of the Friant Dam in 1944, the San Joaquin River was believed to have over 6,000 miles of streambed suitable and available to spawning salmon. However, in 1993 it was estimated that there was just 300 miles.

This significant loss of suitable spawning habitat is due to lack of spawning-sized gravel recruitment from lateral and upstream sources due to the installation of manmade barriers that block this gravel from passing naturally downstream. Without recruitment, high flow releases scour gravel from spawning beds, so that they gradually become smaller and smaller. The smaller pieces of gravel are more easily picked up and moved downstream, leaving behind larger pieces that the salmon are unable to move to bury their eggs in a process called redd construction. This further crowds the salmon into smaller and smaller suitable spawning beds, which increases the likelihood of redd superimposition. This is when spawners construct their redds, or pockets in the gravel to lay their eggs in, on top of preexisting redds, thereby killing or burying some of the eggs in the pre-existing redds. The EPA has also stated that the remaining gravel is "probably fairly highly embedded and therefore of reduced quality and unavailable to fish for spawning". The Temperature of the water can also affect the level of spawning. The best temperatures for spring and fall run Chinook salmon are between 42 °F and 57 °F. However, in 77% of the years studied by the San Joaquin River Restoration Program, water temperatures were elevated above 57 °F and abnormalities and egg morbidity rates increased.

The introduction of predatory fish species such as bluegill and various types of bass that prey on salmon smolt are also a major contributor to the decline. The San Joaquin's point of divergence with the distributary Old River has historically created a sort of bottleneck for out migrating salmon because the Old River in turn branches into many side-channels and sloughs of the delta as well as various canal intakes. Recent years have seen work by the California Department of Water Resources and the California Department of Fish and Game to construct and manage temporary rock barriers at the head of the Old River in order to keep fish in the main channel of the San Joaquin River. In the fall of 2009, just 2,236 salmon returned to the entire river system to spawn; this has led to a government ban on salmon fishing off the coasts of northern California and Oregon. Recent years have seen efforts to bring back some of the salmon population to the San Joaquin and some of its tributaries; these include the establishment of fish hatcheries. As of 2011, plans had been finalized for a $14.5 million hatchery near Friant Dam as part of a $20 million federal restoration project for the fish.

In late 2012, even though there are still dams in the way of allowing salmon to navigate the entire river, attempts were made to get salmon to lay eggs in the upper portion of the river near Friant Dam.

The closest example of a revived salmon population is the Butte River near Chico.

=== Groundwater overdraft ===
Because of the heavy demand of water for agriculture and the insufficient flow of the San Joaquin River, groundwater in the San Joaquin Valley's rich aquifer has been an important source of irrigation supply since the late 19th century. Historically, surface water was able to provide all the needed supply, but as agricultural lands spread across more and more of the valley, groundwater pumping became increasingly common. Also, with the introduction of better technology that allowed farmers to dig deeper wells and install electrical pumps, groundwater was seen as an often cheaper and easily accessible source compared to the river. Water imported from Northern California through the Central Valley Project managed to stave off increasing rates of withdrawal for several years, until the 1977 California drought heavily decreased water supplies from these sources for a while and caused many farmers to return to groundwater pumping.

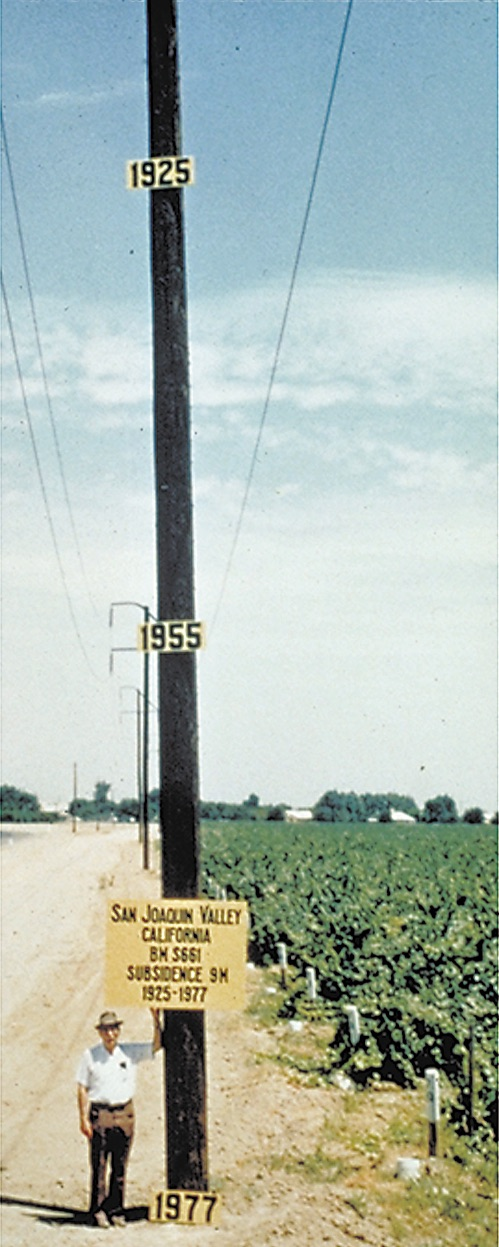
Pole marking the location of maximum land subsidence in the San Joaquin Valley – more than 28 ft (8.5 m) – near Mendota

Groundwater withdrawal reached its peak during the 1960s with more than 8,000,000 acre⋅ft (9,900,000 dam^{3}) being drawn from the aquifer each year – over twice the present flow of the San Joaquin River – which accounted for 69.6% of all the groundwater pumped within the Central Valley, and nearly 14 percent of all the groundwater withdrawn in the United States. In a 1970 study, it was found that more than 5,200 sq mi (13,000 km^{2}) of the San Joaquin River valley had been affected by land subsidence in excess of 1 ft (0.30 m). The maximum drop in elevation was near Mendota, the northward bend of the San Joaquin River, at over 28 feet (8.5 m). In some areas, the water table has declined more than 400 feet (120 m) vertically, forcing farmers to sink their wells as deep as 3,500 ft (1,100 m) to hit more abundant pockets of the underground water.

Even after better practices and new sources of water through federal projects, groundwater pumping continues at a tremendous rate. The San Joaquin Valley aquifer lost about 60,000,000 acre⋅ft (74,000,000 dam^{3}) from 1961 to 2003, which despite being a dramatic reduction from the 1960s, still amounts to nearly 1,500,000 acre⋅ft (1,900,000 dam^{3}) per year. The subsidence caused by groundwater withdrawal has threatened infrastructure in the San Joaquin Valley, including the California Aqueduct, a State Water Project facility that conveys water from the delta region to coastal-central and southern California. Subsidence has also damaged highways and power lines as well as causing some areas to be more susceptible to flooding.

=== Reconnecting to the ocean ===
In 2009, the Bureau of Reclamation began to release water from Friant Dam in an effort to restore two once-dry stretches of the San Joaquin of about 64 mi (103 km). These two reaches are from below the dam to Mendota Pool, and from the Sack Dam, a diversion dam approximately 24 mi (39 km) downstream, to the confluence with the Merced River. The flows were initially 350 cu ft/s (9.9 m^{3}/s) in that year. The increased flows will not only begin to restore large areas of desiccated riverside habitat below the dam, but will serve the primary purpose of restoring salmon runs in the upper San Joaquin watershed. The restoration flows, however, will cause a 12 to 15 percent reduction of water provided by the Friant Division of the CVP with complaints from irrigators in the valley as a result. There has also been a lawsuit regarding damage to farmland west of the San Joaquin, near the town of Los Baños, claiming that the flows are seeping through levees that have not seen use in years due to the drying out of the river channel.

In addition to the dry reaches, the higher discharge in the San Joaquin will help restore a total of 153 mi (246 km) of river, figuring in stretches with low or polluted flows. It is also hoped that the water will help dilute contaminants in the river caused by pesticides and fertilizers that are applied to the surrounding farmland. In turn, the boost in flow could assist restoration efforts and help flush out saline water in the Sacramento-San Joaquin Delta, where water is pumped into state aqueducts which provide water supplies to two-thirds of Californians.

Phase One improvements include the following: The San Joaquin River east of Los Banos will be increased to route up to 475 cu ft/s (13.5 m^{3}/s) of water by December 2011. Salmon will be re-introduced to the river in 2012, most habitat conservation work on the San Joaquin River will be completed by the end of 2013. Phase One will include interim flows of up to 475 cu ft/s (13.5 m^{3}/s). Capacity will be increased to handle up to 4,500 cu ft/s (130 m^{3}/s) from Friant Dam to the Mendota Dam by December 2013. A fish ladder will also be added to the Sack Dam.

Phase Two improvements include the following: The USBR will begin releasing up to 600 cu ft/s (17 m^{3}/s), or "full restoration flows", from the Friant Dam in 2014. Flows will depend on whether the year is wet, dry or for intermediate levels of precipitation. Additional rehabilitation work is projected to continue until 2016 to ensure that the river can transport 4,500 cu ft/s (130 m^{3}/s) of water through rainfall and releases from Friant Dam all the way to Bear Creek and the Eastside bypass. The higher capacity of the river is also to accommodate rainfall or prevent flooding.

The total cost of the restoration, one of the largest river recovery efforts in the United States, could be up to $800 million or even a billion dollars. Approximately $330 million will be paid by Central Valley farmers, and the state and federal governments will provide the remaining funding.

The San Joaquin River was last connected to the ocean in 2010. By reconnecting, it means the portion from Friant Dam to where the San Joaquin River joins the Merced river above Vernalis. This may happen in 2016 or 2017.

=== Wetlands ===
Efforts have been under way to restore wetlands along the San Joaquin River as well as on the historic shores of Tulare Lake. These primarily entail the cleanup of existing wetlands and procuring additional water supplies, rather than converting agricultural land back into the original swamp and marsh. Since wetlands can provide a natural form of flood control – wetlands act like sponges, absorbing flood flows during the rainy season and releasing the accumulated water during the dry season – and also can filter out many forms of toxins, especially from fertilizers, they are important to maintaining good water quality in the San Joaquin River. Wetlands preservation group Ducks Unlimited was awarded a $1 million grant in 2005 as part of the North American Wetlands Conservation Act in order to conduct restoration work on 23,000 acres (9,300 ha) of swamps and marshes throughout the San Joaquin Valley.

== Watershed ==
At 15,600 sq mi (40,000 km^{2}), the San Joaquin River watershed proper drains a fair swath of inland central California, an area comparable to the size of the Upper Peninsula of Michigan. If combined with the 16,200 sq mi (42,000 km^{2}) Tulare Basin, which historically (and still rarely) experiences northerly outflow to the San Joaquin River, it would be the largest single drainage basin entirely in the state. The San Joaquin River basin is roughly synonymous with the San Joaquin Valley, and is bounded by the Sierra Nevada to the east, the Coast Ranges on the west, and the Tehachapi Mountains on the south.

The San Joaquin Valley's major southeast–northwest axis runs roughly parallel with the Pacific coast of California; it measures 280 by 115 mi (451 by 185 km) covering all or parts of seventeen California counties (Note: The counties at least partially in the San Joaquin-Tulare watershed are, in alphabetical order: Alameda, Alpine, Amador, Calaveras, Contra Costa, Fresno, Kings, Kern, Madera, Mariposa, Merced, Sacramento, San Benito, San Joaquin, Stanislaus, Solano, Tulare, and Tuolumne.) stretching from north of Lodi to well south of Bakersfield. Most of the elevation change in the San Joaquin occurs within the first 97 mi (156 km) above Friant Dam. Its highest headwaters are at over 12,000 ft (3,700 m), but by the time the river reaches the foothills, it is a mere 580 ft (180 m) above sea level.

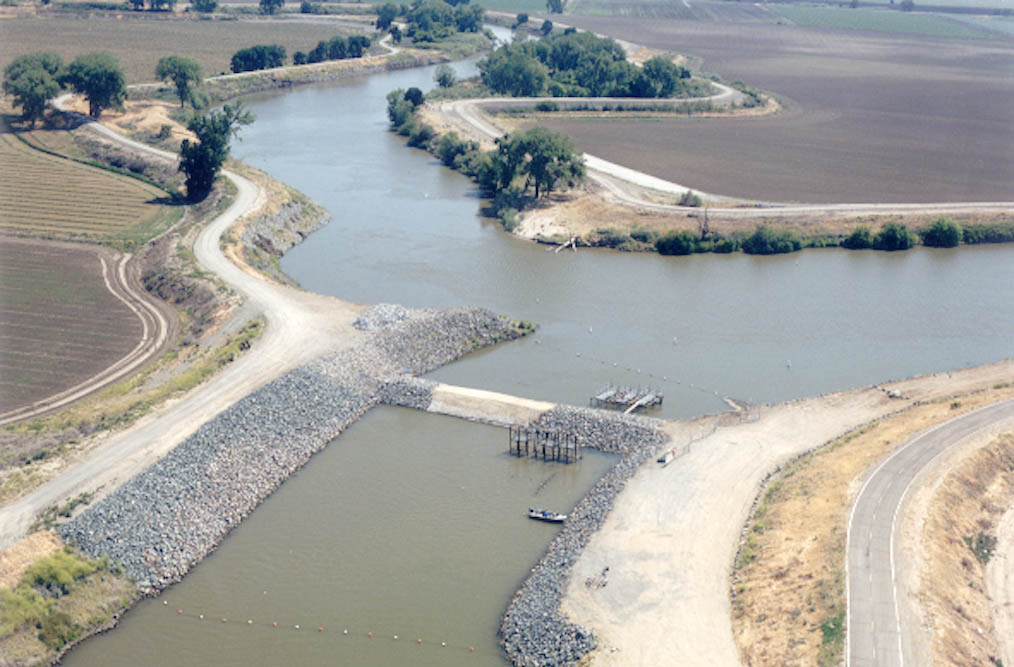
The lower San Joaquin River, at the head of the distributary Old River

On the west and northwest, the San Joaquin watershed borders those of rivers draining into the Pacific, while beyond almost all of the other divides lie endorheic basins, mostly of the Great Basin. To the north, a low series of ridges separates the San Joaquin River basin from that of the Sacramento River. The Coast Ranges bound the watershed on the west and borders on the drainages of the Pajaro River, Salinas River and the endorheic Carrizo Plain. On the south, the Tehachapis wall off the Tulare Basin from the Mojave Desert. To the east, the Sierra Nevada separate the San Joaquin drainage from those of multiple smaller rivers that terminate in various Great Basin lakes. From north to south, these are the Carson, Walker, and Owens Rivers. The sloping alluvial fan of the Kings River divides the northern San Joaquin Valley from the Tulare Basin.

The overwhelming majority of the economic base in the San Joaquin River watershed is provided by agriculture. The valley is widely considered one of the most productive farming regions in the world, and the top four U.S. counties ranked by agricultural production are all located in the San Joaquin watershed and Tulare Basin. The crops grown in these four counties alone are valued at over $12.6 billion annually, while the production of the entire valley is estimated at more than $14.4 billion. The main crop in the valley by annual sales is cotton, but more than 200 types of produce are grown along the San Joaquin River and in the Tulare Basin, including rice, almonds and lettuce. Livestock raising is also a major business in the valley. This prodigious output has earned the basin many names, including the "breadbasket" or "salad bowl" of the United States.

As of 2009, the San Joaquin River watershed had a human population of roughly 4,039,000, (Note: The population was calculated by adding the populations of 13 of the 18 counties together. Alameda, Sacramento, San Benito, Solano and Contra Costa counties are omitted because they have barely any land within the San Joaquin watershed; in addition, their main population centers are outside of the basin.) about 1.9 million of whom live within the section of the watershed not including the Tulare Basin. The largest cities are Bakersfield, near the south end of the valley on the Kern River; Fresno, roughly in the geographic center; Modesto, on the Tuolumne River; and Stockton, on the southeast fringe of the Delta region. Other major cities include Visalia, Tulare, Hanford, Porterville, Madera, Merced, Turlock, Manteca and Lodi. Population growth is among the highest in the state of California and more than twice the U.S. average. In Madera County, near the geographic middle of the basin, growth was 51.5% between 1990 and 2003, the highest in the San Joaquin basin. Most of the major cities lie on the State Route 99 corridor, which runs along the entirety of the San Joaquin Valley and forms the primary thoroughfare for the valley. Interstate 5 provides the major transportation route for the west side of the valley.

Land cover in the watershed is predominantly agriculture and forest, and large expanses of shrubland and semiarid foothill terrain also occupy portions of the basin in addition to a growing urban percentage. Irrigated land covers 30% of the watershed followed by forested areas in addition to national forest and park land that encompass 26.8% of the total land area. Built-up areas use a much smaller percentage of the watershed, at just 1.9%. In the San Joaquin's direct drainage region (not including the Tulare Basin) agricultural cover was 19.2%, forests embraced 28.4%, and urban areas occupied 2.4% as of 1995. The basin's main population centers are in the north and south and population density generally increases from west to east. In fact, despite the relatively small percentage of developed areas, more than 50% of the population lives in the watershed's four largest cities: Fresno, Bakersfield, Stockton and Modesto.

=== Tributaries ===
Seven major tributaries flow directly into the San Joaquin River, all of which run from the Sierra Nevada westwards into the main stem. In addition, some of the discharge of the Kings River also enters the San Joaquin directly (but seasonally) through a distributary. Of these, the Tuolumne River is the largest in any respect: longest, greatest drainage basin, and highest discharge. The Merced River is the second largest by length and drainage basin, but the Mokelumne River has a greater flow. Tributaries are listed below proceeding from the mouth upstream, with their respective main-stem length, watershed and discharge noted. Rivers of the Tulare Basin are noted below the San Joaquin's direct tributaries with their individual data. Most of the tributaries had much larger flows before irrigation diversions – for example, the Tuolumne's historic discharge was almost 48% higher than it is now.

Name	Length		Drainage basin		Discharge		Notes
	mi	km	mi^{2}	km^{2}	cfs	m^{3}/s	
Mokelumne River	95	153	1,700	4,400	1,070	30	
Calaveras River	52	84	470	1,200	225	6.4	
Stanislaus River	96	154	1,075	2,780	962	27.2	
Tuolumne River	149	240	1,960	5,100	1,330	38	
Merced River	145	233	1,726	4,470	661	18.7	
Chowchilla River	54	87	254	660	100	2.8	
Fresno River	68	109	320	830	110	3.1	
Kings River (Note: Some water from the Kings flows directly into the San Joaquin via Fresno Slough depending on the season.)†	133	214	1,693	4,380	2,287	64.8	
Kaweah River†	59	95	828	2,140	554	15.7	
Tule River†	49	79	410	1,100	197	5.6	
Kern River†	164	264	3,612	9,360	941	26.6	

†Tributaries in the Tulare Lake basin

== See also ==
- List of rivers of California
- List of most-polluted rivers
- Fine Gold Creek
- San Joaquin River National Wildlife Refuge

== Works cited ==
- Arax, Mark; Wartzman, Rick (2005). The King of California: J.G. Boswell and the Making of A Secret American Empire. PublicAffairs. ISBN 1-58648-281-5.
- Beck, Warren A.; Haase, Ynez D. (1992). Historic Atlas of the American West. University of Oklahoma Press. ISBN 0-8061-2456-3.
- Benke, Arthur C.; Cushing, Colbert E. (2005). Rivers of North America. Academic Press. ISBN 0-12-088253-1.
- California Department of Engineering (1914). Biennial report of the Department of Engineering of the State of California. California State Printing Office.
- Curtis, Edward S. (1924). The North American Indian. Volume 14 - The Kato. The Wailaki. The Yuki. The Pomo. The Wintun. The Maidu. The Miwok. The Yokuts. Classic Books Company. ISBN 0-7426-9814-9.
- Gudde, Erwin G.; Bright, William (2004). California Place Names: The Origin and Etymology of Current Geographical Names. University of California Press. ISBN 0-520-24217-3.
- Heizer, Robert Fleming; Elsasser, Albert B. (1980). The natural world of the California Indians. California Natural History Guides. Vol. 46. University of California Press. ISBN 0-520-03896-7.
- Heizer, Robert; Sturtevant, William C. (1978). Handbook of North American Indians: California, Volume 3. Government Printing Office. ISBN 0-16-004574-6.
- Hicks, Jack (2000). The Literature of California: Native American beginnings to 1945. University of California Press. ISBN 0-520-21524-9.
- Hittell, Theodore Henry (1861). The adventures of James Capen Adams: mountaineer and grizzly bear hunter of California. Crosby, Nichols, Lee and Company.
- Hoover, Mildred Brooke; Kyle, Douglas E. (2002). Historic spots in California. Stanford University Press. ISBN 0-8047-4482-3.
- Hundley, Norris (Jr.) (1992). The Great Thirst: Californians and Water, 1770s-1990s. University of California Press. ISBN 0-520-07786-5.
- Igler, David (2001). Industrial cowboys: Miller & Lux and the transformation of the Far West, 1850-1920. University of California Press. ISBN 0-520-22658-5.
- Johnson, Stephen; Haslam, Gerald W.; Dawson, Robert (1993). The Great Central Valley: California's Heartland. University of California Press. ISBN 0-520-06411-9.
- Merchant, Carolyn (1998). Green versus gold: sources in California's environmental history. Island Press. ISBN 1-55963-580-0.
- Putnam, Frederick Ward; Kroeber, Alfred Louis; Lowis, Robert Harry (1907). Publications in American archaeology and ethnology. Vol. 2. University of California Press.
- Pritzker, Barry (2000). A Native American encyclopedia: history, culture and peoples. Oxford University Press. ISBN 0-19-513877-5.
- Rose, Gene (2000). The San Joaquin: A River Betrayed. Quill Driver Books. ISBN 1-884995-20-9.
- Waldman, Carl (2007). Atlas of the North American Indian. Infobase Publishing. ISBN 978-0-8160-6859-3.
- Walker, Paul Robert (1999). Exploring the Great Rivers of North America. National Geographic Society. ISBN 0-7922-7847-X.
