= Rancho Lomerias Muertas =

Mexican land grant in California

Coordinates: 36.890°N 121.530°W

Rancho Lomerias Muertas was a 6,660-acre (27.0 km^{2}) Mexican land grant in present-day San Benito County, California given in 1842 by Governor Juan B. Alvarado to José Antonio Castro. The name means "barren hills". The grant was between the Pajaro River and the San Benito River, south of present-day Gilroy.

== History ==
General José Castro was the son of José Tiburcio Castro, administrator of the secularized Mission San Juan Bautista, and grantee of Rancho Sausal.

In 1844, José Antonio Castro sold Rancho Lomerias Muertas to José María Sanchez. Sanchez was the grantee in 1835 of Rancho Llano de Tesquisquita directly to the north of Rancho Lomerias Muertas. Jose Maria Sanchez (1804–1852), came to California from Mexico in 1825 forming a partnership with Francisco Perez Pacheco, grantee of Rancho Ausaymas y San Felipe. In 1840, Sanchez married Maria Encarnacion Ortega (1824–1894), the daughter of Quentin Ortega and Vicenta Butron of Rancho San Ysidro. The first rancho Sanchez bought was Rancho Las Animas from the widow of Mariano Castro in 1835.

With the cession of California to the United States following the Mexican-American War, the 1848 Treaty of Guadalupe Hidalgo provided that the land grants would be honored. As required by the Land Act of 1851, a claim for Rancho Lomerias Muertas was filed with the Public Land Commission in 1852, and the grant was patented to the heirs of José M. Sanchez in 1866.

With the acquisition of Rancho Lomerias Muertas, the Sanchez domain extended over 49,000 acres (198 km^{2}) with the Pajaro River dividing his lands. Sanchez drowned in the Pajaro River on Christmas Eve, 1852, leaving his widow, Maria Encarnacion Ortega Sanchez, and five children (sisters: Vicenta, Refugia, Candelaria, Guadalupe and one brother, José Gregorio). Numerous men saw an opportunity to gain control of the vast Sanchez estate. In 1853, Maria married her attorney, Thomas B. Godden, who was helping her defend her estate against crooked authorities in Monterey County that were attempting to embezzle her wealth. Godden was killed in the explosion of the steamboat "Jenny Lind" en route from Alviso to San Francisco on April 11, 1853. Maria's two husbands had died within four months of each other. In 1853, Maria married Dr. Henry L. Sanford. In 1855, Sanford was killed in a shootout with one of the men who was defrauding the family, and Maria Encarnacion Ortega married George W. Crane (1827–1868), who died of measles in 1868.

In 1864, the Sanchez heirs started selling their share of the land to Henry Miller. By 1867, Miller and Lux owned 44,000 acres (178 km^{2}) of the Sanchez ranchos.

In 1871, and Maria Encarnacion Ortega married her fifth husband, Anastacio Alviso, who shortly after their marriage was accidentally shot and killed while hunting.

== See also ==
- Ranchos of California
- List of Ranchos of California
