= Rancho Las Animas =

Human settlement in California, United States of America

Coordinates: 36.980°N 121.560°W

Rancho Las Ánimas (also called Las Ánimas o La Poza de Carnedero or La Brea) was a 26,519-acre (107.32 km^{2}) Spanish land concession in present-day Santa Clara County given in 1803 by Viceroy Félix Berenguer de Marquina to José Mariano Castro. The rancho was regranted in 1835 to Castro's widow Josefa Romero de Castro by Mexican Governor José Figueroa. The present-day city of Gilroy is within the grant.

== History ==
In 1803, Feliz Beranceur, then Viceroy and Governor of New Spain, made a conditional grant of the Las Ánimas Ranch to José Mariano Castro (1765–1828). Castro, the son of Joaquin Ysidro de Castro and Maria Marina Botiller, was a soldier in the Monterey garrison.

Mariano Castro died in 1828, leaving a widow, Josefa Romero de Castro, and eight children. The property descended to his heirs in the following proportions: To the widow, one-half, and to the children each one-sixteenth. Governor Figueroa confirmed the grant to Josefa Romero de Castro in 1835. In 1835, Josefa Romero de Castro and four of the children sold their interest in the rancho to Jose Maria Sanchez (1804 - 1852), thus giving Sanchez a title to three-fourths of the property. The remaining fourth continuing to be the property of the other four Castro children. Sanchez was also the owner of Rancho Llano de Tesquisquita and Rancho Lomerias Muertas.

With the cession of California to the United States following the Mexican-American War, the 1848 Treaty of Guadalupe Hidalgo provided that the land grants would be honored. As required by the Land Act of 1851, José Maria Sanchez filed his petition for Rancho Las Ánimas with the Public Land Commission in 1852. Shortly after, Sanchez drowned in the Pajaro River on Christmas Eve, 1852 leaving his widow, Maria Encarnacion Ortega Sanchez, and five children (sisters: Vicenta; Refugia; Candelaria; Guadalupe and one brother, José Gregorio). In 1873, a patent for 26,842 acres (109 km^{2}) was issued to the heirs of Jose Maria Sanchez.

Josefa Castro sold her one sixteenth interest to Martin Murphy, who sold it Johanna Fitzgerald. Vicente Castro sold his sixteenth interest to Alexis Godey, who sold it to Thomas Rea. Encarnacion Castro and Maria Lugardo Castro sold their sixteenth interests to Henry Miller. When the land commission issued its patent in 1871, Johanna Fitzgerald, Thomas Rea and Henry Miller owned over 80% of the 26,518 acres (107 km^{2}) rancho.

After Henry Miller's death, the Miller family sold land around Miller's summer home to Santa Clara County to form Mount Madonna County Park. On the Glen Ranch section of the Miller land, Miller built the Miller Red Barn.
