= Rancho Llano de Tesquisquita =

Former Mexican land grant

Coordinates: 36.960°N 121.490°W

Rancho Llano de Tesquisquita was a 16,016-acre (64.81 km^{2}) Mexican land grant in present-day San Benito County and Santa Clara County, California given in 1835 by Governor José Castro to José María Sanchez. The name means "flats of Tesquisquita". The grant extended from the Pajaro River to Tesquisquita Slough, south of present-day Gilroy.

== History ==
José María Sanchez (1804–1852) came to modern-day California from Mexico in 1825, forming a partnership with Francisco Perez Pacheco, grantee of Rancho Ausaymas y San Felipe. In 1840, Sanchez married Maria Encarnacion Ortega (1824–1894), the daughter of Quentin Ortega and Vicenta Butron of Rancho San Ysidro. Sanchez first bought Rancho Las Animas from the widow of Mariano Castro in 1835. Sanchez was granted Rancho Llano de Tesquisquita in 1835. In 1844 Sanchez bought Rancho Lomerias Muertas from Jose A. Castro. Although he owned thousands of cattle, meat was not in demand at the time, so Sanchez made money by selling hides and tallow, as well as manufacturing soap from the tallow. San Felipe Lake, also called Upper Soap Lake, is a permanent lake on the upper reaches of the Pajaro River.

With the cession of California to the United States following the Mexican-American War, the 1848 Treaty of Guadalupe Hidalgo provided that the land grants would be honored. As required by the Land Act of 1851, a claim for Rancho Llano de Tesquisquita was filed with the Public Land Commission in 1852, and the grant was patented to the heirs of José María Sanchez in 1873.

With the acquisition of Rancho Lomerias Muertas, the Sanchez domain extended over 49,000 acres (198 km^{2}), with the Pajaro River dividing his lands. When the California gold rush began in 1848, the influx of American prospectors brought a high demand for beef and horses, and the value of Sanchez's holdings multiplied manyfold. His wealth increased even more by gambling with prospectors who traveled up from Mexico to mine gold, and passed through his spacious estates on the way back home. These miners would bet on their card games with the gold they carried. With Sanchez being a canny gambler, and having supplied the miners with all the liquor they could drink, he quickly accumulated large amounts of gold in the form of coins, flakes and dust. He earned additional income by loaning money to residents of Monterey. As American settlers moved into California, his land also multiplied in value. His estate would eventually be valued at $300,000 ($12.5 million in 2025).

However, Sanchez drowned in the Pajaro River on Christmas Eve 1852, leaving behind a widow, Maria Encarnacion Ortega Sanchez, and five children (four sisters: Vicenta; Refugia; Candelaria; Guadalupe, and one brother: José Gregorio). Numerous men saw an opportunity to gain control of the vast Sanchez estate by wedding Maria. In 1853, Maria married her attorney, Thomas B. Godden. Godden was killed in the explosion of the steamboat "Jenny Lind" en route from Alviso to San Francisco on April 11, 1853. Maria's two husbands had died within four months of each other. In 1853, Maria married Dr. Henry L. Sanford.

In 1855, California jurist and Democratic politician David S. Terry took up the cause of "Widow Sanchez" after it was found she was being cheated by local authorities, including the sheriff, William Roach, who took her fortune under the guise of guardianship. After kidnapping Roach with the help of a local gunslinger named Anastacio Garcia, Terry and his allies held Roach in a jail cell in Stockton until he agreed to release the widow's gold. But Roach had bribed a guard to ride to Monterey and urge Roach's family to hide the gold. The treasure was hidden somewhere in Carmel Valley, California by Roach's brother-in-law, Jerry MacMahon. Later that day, MacMahon had a run-in at a hotel bar with Maria's third husband Henry Sanford. Drawing their guns, they shot each other dead, and the location of the gold was lost forever.

A few months later, Maria married George W. Crane (1827–1868). In 1864, the Sanchez heirs started selling their share of the land to Henry Miller. By 1867, Miller and Lux owned 44,000 acres (178 km^{2}) of the Sanchez ranchos. Maria moved with her fourth husband Crane to San Juan, where Crane died of measles in 1868.

In 1871, Maria Encarnacion Ortega married her fifth husband, Anastacio Alviso, who shortly after their marriage was shot and killed in a hunting accident.

== See also ==
- Ranchos of California
- List of Ranchos of California
