= Henry Miller (rancher) =

German-American rancher

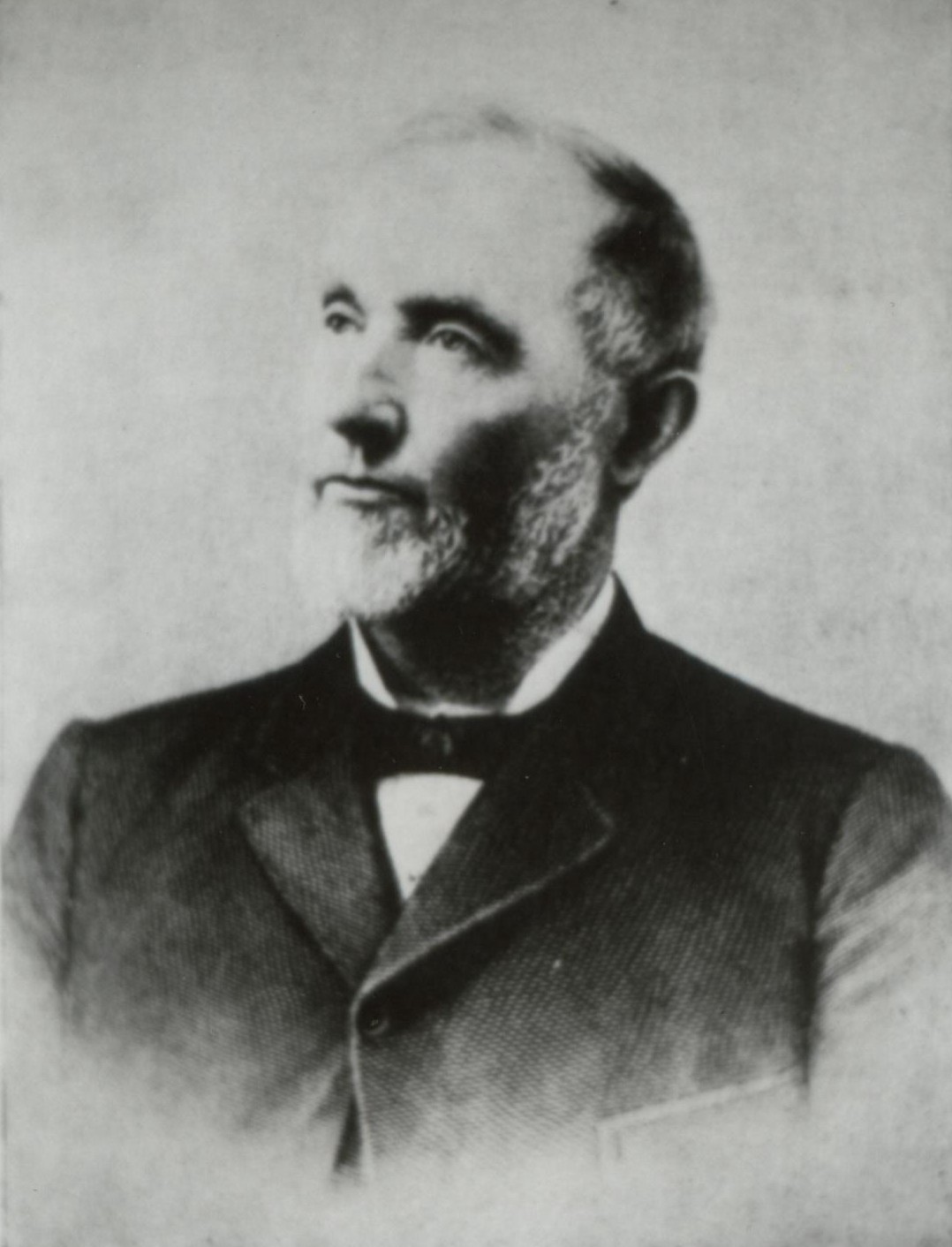
Henry Miller, c. 1887

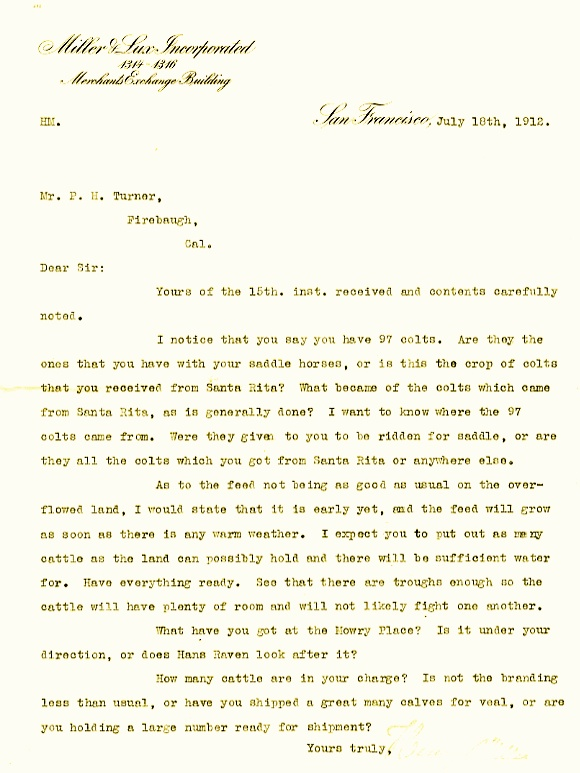
Correspondence between Henry Miller and his superintendent, P.H. Turner

Henry Miller (July 21, 1827 – October 14, 1916) was a German-American rancher known as the "Cattle King of California" who at one point in the late 19th century was one of the largest land-owners in the United States.

== Life and work ==
Born in Brackenheim, Duchy of Württemberg as Heinrich Albrecht Kreiser (Kreyser), he emigrated to New York City in 1846, where he worked as a butcher. He moved to California in 1850 under the name Henry Miller, a name borrowed from the non-transferable steamer ticket he had purchased from a friend in New York.

Miller built up a thriving butcher business in San Francisco, later going into partnership with Charles Lux, also a German immigrant and a former competitor, in 1858. The Miller and Lux company expanded rapidly, shifting emphasis from meat products to cattle raising, and soon became the largest producer of cattle in California and one of the largest landowners in the United States, owning 1,400,000 acres (5,700 km^{2}) directly and controlling nearly 22,000 square miles (57,000 km^{2}) of cattle and farm land in California, Nevada, and Oregon.

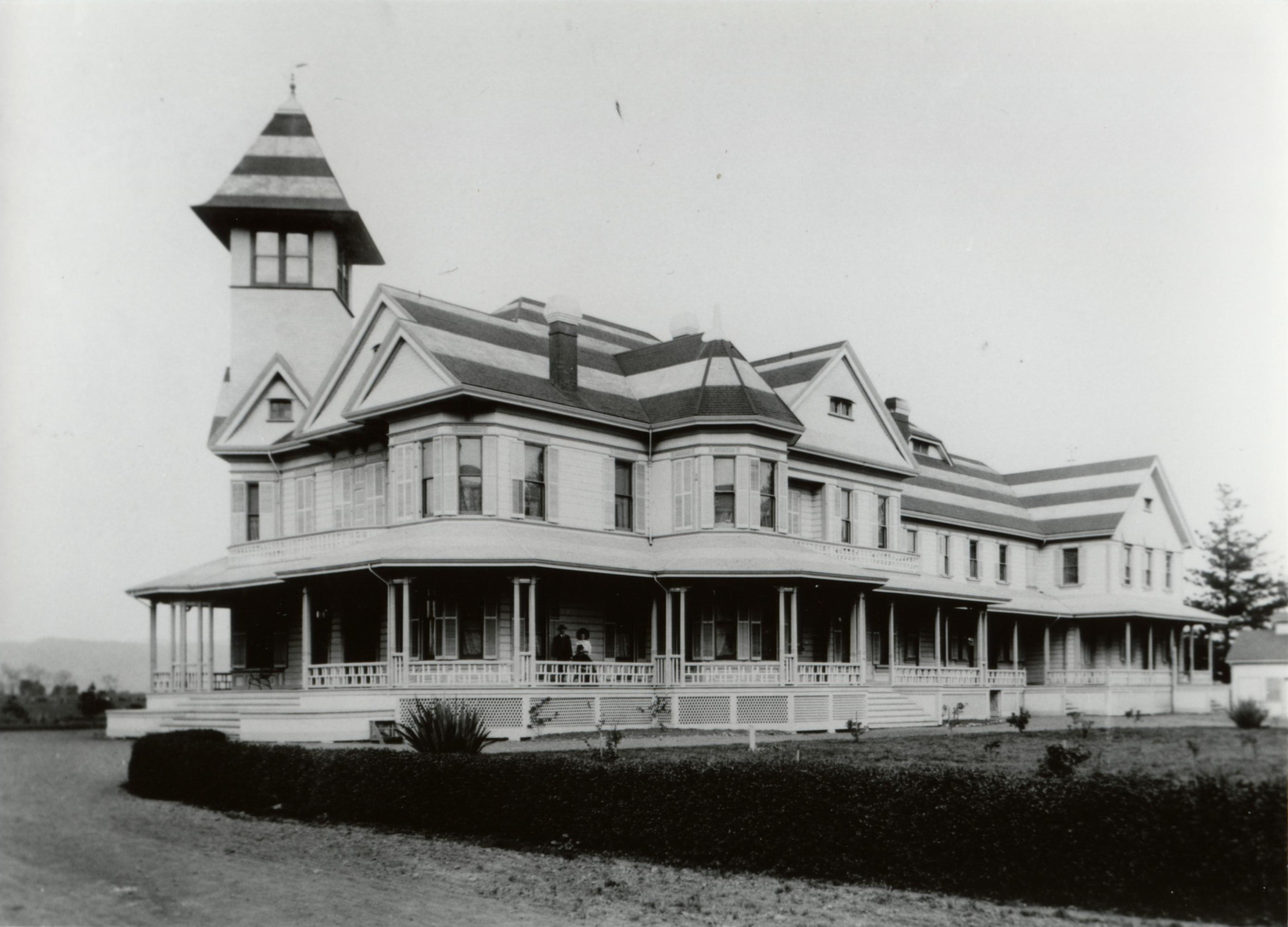
Bloomfield, the home of Henry Miller, completed in 1887

Miller purchased most of the Spanish/Mexican land grants lying between San Francisco and the San Joaquin for about $1.15 per acre, ranged his cattle over the area and eventually forced the land grant heirs to sell out to him at his price. Grants he purchased all or part of included Rancho Las Animas and Rancho Llano de Tesquisquita (in Santa Clara County); and Rancho Lomerias Muertas (in San Benito County); Rancho Sanjon de Santa Rita (in Merced County), and Rancho San Lorenzo (in Monterey County). He also "kept the local officials, particularly the county assessors, in his debt.". The Miller and Lux Corporation was headquartered in Los Banos, on the west side of the San Joaquin Valley. Miller and Lux also became owners of the lakebed of the Buena Vista Lake. Miller played a major role in the development of much of the San Joaquin Valley during the late 19th century and early 20th century. His role in maintaining and managing his corporate farming empire illustrates the growing trend of industrial barons during the Gilded Age. This detailed correspondence with Superintendent Turner reflects his micromanagement business style and underscores the lack of autonomy of rural farmers in the region. Miller persistently corresponded with his subordinates in order to verify that all the cattle met his standards before being sold. The correspondences demonstrate his attention to detail, especially in regards to the weather conditions and the amount of food and water the ranches contained. In 1910, his upstream water rights to the San Joaquin River, which crossed much of the company's land, were acquired by the Big Creek Hydroelectric Project; the project's planned reservoir storage of snowmelt would greatly reduce flooding and increase river flow during the dry season.

At the time of his death, in California, Miller's estate was appraised at some US$40,000,000 (equivalent to about $1,183,000,000 in 2025), somewhat less than during his prime. The Henry Miller Trust dissolved after the death of Miller's last grandchild in 1962 and the remaining land was split between Miller's heirs. Miller's grandson George Nickel reorganized the holdings and became a large farmer and land developer. Some of his descendants continue to farm in the area around Los Banos and to operate as farmers and land developers in Bakersfield and Kern County. Miller's contemporary descendants include Wiley Nickel, an American politician and former member of the U.S House of Representatives from North Carolina’s 13th congressional district; journalist Nellie Bowles; and Tucker Carlson, who is a descendant of Miller through his birth mother, Lisa McNear Lombardi.

== See also ==
- Tule Elk State Natural Reserve
