= Charles Lux =

American businessman and rancher

Charles Lux (December 28, 1823 – March 15, 1887) was a businessman-rancher and (with his partner Henry Miller) one of the largest landowners in California.

== Biography ==
Lux was born to Nicolas Lux and Marie Anne (Linck) in the commune of Hatten, in Alsace on the Rhine between Strasbourg and Karlsruhe. While yet a boy, he emigrated to New York City, where he found employment as a delivery boy for a retail butcher in Fulton Market. He eventually became a butchers' helper, making six dollars per month.

He left New York for San Francisco in 1849; by 1853 he had opened his own S.F. retail butcher shop at 931 Washington Street. In 1856, he bought 1,500 acres of land south of San Bruno Mountain from the children of Jose Antonio Sanchez (a former alcalde of San Francisco), on which he established both a feedlot to supply his business and a large home (one of the first Peninsula 'mansions') which he named Baden after the grand duchy across the Rhine from his birthplace. The Baden development was serviced by the San Francisco and San Jose Railroad (later incorporated into the Southern Pacific) when it ran its lines south of San Francisco in 1863, and later formed a nucleus of the city of South San Francisco.

The success of the wholesale feedlot enterprise soon overshadowed his retail business, and Lux became interested in acquiring that business' suppliers. Much of California's best farming and ranching lands was entitled by Spanish and Mexican land-grants, particularly the 800+ grants signed (and back-dated) by Mexican Governor Pio Pico in 1846. At the same time, the Panic of 1857 and President Buchanan's monetary remedies deprived the Western states of capital for investment San Francisco, however, continued growing (from 24,000 in 1850 to 56,000 in 1860 and 155,000 in 1870) - financed by the gold-mining industry and (after 1857) the silver from the Comstock Lode. Growth and financial surfeit meant that the Lux businesses were cash-rich at a time when many hopeful ranchers lacked access to credit in turn, this enabled Lux to begin buying large tracts from California land-grants.

== Miller & Lux ==
In 1862, Lux formed a partnership with fellow-butcher Henry Miller under the name of Miller & Lux. Beginning as cattle dealers and wholesale butchers, the firm continued to invest in ranching properties, at one point owning more than 2,200 square miles of Western land. Eventually, their expanding cattle empire collided with the interests of land-developers; in 1879 this led to the historic Lux v. Haggin water-rights case.

In 1870, Lux moved to South Park in downtown Los Angeles, from which he supervised many of the activities of Miller & Lux, although he often visited his Baden estate.

== Family Life ==
Lux married the widow of a miner, Miranda Potter (née Sheldon) during his San Francisco residency. She was active in charities, including the establishment of the German Hospital, and funding a number of educational institutions. She and her husband were instrumental in establishing the Golden Gate Park Conservatory. Lux died of pneumonia in Los Angeles in 1887.
