= Chinese Peak =

Chinese Peak may refer to:

- Chinese Peak (California), a mountain in California
- Chinese Peak (Idaho), a mountain in Idaho
