= Camp Kern =

Boy Scout camp in California, US

- Owner: Southern Sierra Council
- Headquarters: Bakersfield, CA
- Location: Lakeshore, California
- Country: United States
- Coordinates: 37°15′07″N 119°10′18″W
- Founded: 1939
- Camp Director: Unknown
- Program Director: Unknown
- Website sscscouts.org

Camp Kern was a Scouting America summer camp owned and operated by the Southern Sierra Council. Camp Kern was located along the south eastern shore of Huntington Lake in the Sierra National Forest in Fresno County, California.

During the Creek Fire of 2020, Camp Kern suffered considerable wildfire damage, with the dining hall, bathroom buildings, camp store, and all other camp structures completely destroyed.

== History ==
Camp Kern was established by the BSA in 1939. The camp was originally named Camp Huntington, with 39 Boy Scouts attending the first weekly session. By the mid-1990s, the camp was hosting over 3,000 Scouts each summer. The summer before the fire, attendance was down to just a few hundred, and it was a financial failure.

In September, 2020, Camp Kern was fully engulfed in the Creek Fire. All of the camp's structures were completely destroyed.

Camp Kern is gone now. The Southern Sierra Council (who maintained Camp Kern) is also gone now. Everything except for one small structure burned up, and the probability of any restoration or otherwise development is nil. Membership in the new "Scouting America" is dwindling, and many former scout camps are closing...rebuilding this one is not viable.

== Program ==
Camp Kern, like most Scouts BSA summer camps, divided activities into different program areas such as Waterfront, Nature, Shooting Sports, and Outdoor Skills. Each area has its own staff members (age 16+) and a director (age 21+) trained at BSA's National Camp School.

During the 2019 season, Camp Kern offered 34 different merit badges and a "Trail to First Class" advancement program. The camp also offered additional several awards and training programs for both older scouts (age 15+) and adults (age 18+), including BSA Lifeguard, Leave No Trace Awareness, and Safe Swim Defense.
