= Pacific Skyline Council =

Boy Scouts of America regional council

Pacific Skyline Council (#031)
- Owner: Boy Scouts of America
- Headquarters: Foster City, California
- Country: United States
- Founded: 1994
- President: Bill Long
- Council Commissioner: Dan Callaghan
- Scout Executive: Brian Curtis
- Website pacsky.org

One of the four Boy Scouts of America councils that serves the San Francisco Bay area, the Pacific Skyline Council was founded in 1940 as the Stanford Area Council (#031). In 1994, the Stanford Area Council merged with the San Mateo County Council (#020) to form the current council which serves youth in San Mateo County and northern Santa Clara county.

== Organization ==
- Discovery District: northern/western San Mateo County, including Brisbane, El Granada, Half Moon Bay, Millbrae, Moss Beach, Pacifica, San Bruno, South San Francisco, and the southern portions of Colma and Daly City
- Redwood District: southern San Mateo County, including Atherton, Belmont, Burlingame, Foster City, Hillsborough, Menlo Park, Portola Valley, Redwood City, San Carlos, San Mateo, Woodside, and La Honda
- Stanford District: northern Santa Clara County, including Palo Alto, Los Altos, Los Altos Hills, and Mountain View

== Camps ==
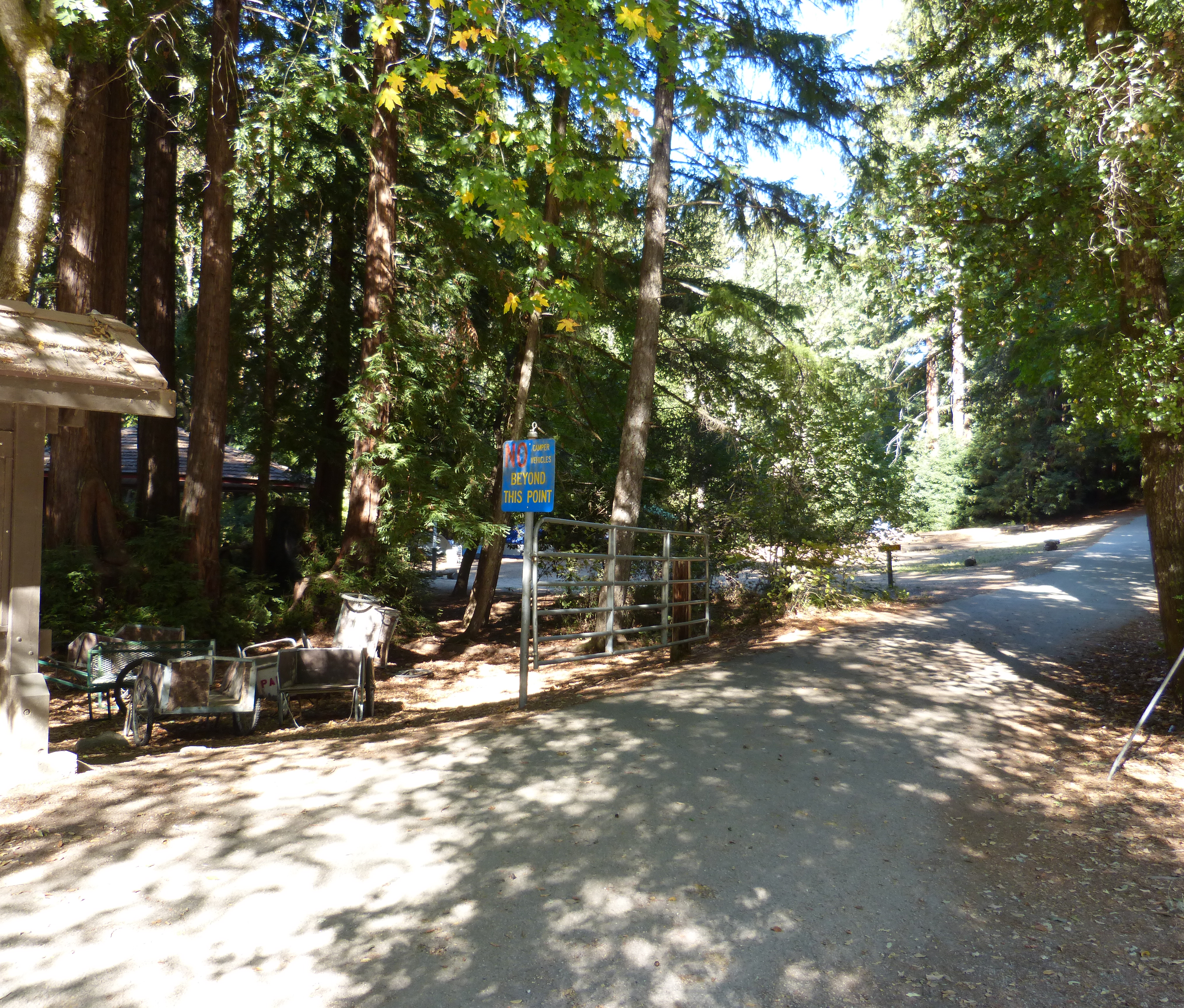
Boulder Creek Scout Reservation entrance

- Cutter Scout Reservation (located in the Santa Cruz Mountains) is a Scout camp set in a redwood grove north of Big Basin Redwoods National Park. The camp contains many activities including a pool, a lake (Lake Gamlen), and an operational C.O.P.E. course. Many council weekend events are held at the reservation including Camporees, Order of the Arrow ordeals, and fellowships. In August 2020, the CZU Lightning Complex Fire burned through the camp. Several bigger structures, including the Harkson Lodge, were lost in the blaze, but the Troop Services Building, the Pool, and a number of smaller structures survived.
- Boulder Creek Scout Reservation is located in the Santa Cruz Mountains near Boulder Creek, California. The reservation is home to the council's National Youth Leadership Training program performed every summer.
- Camp Oljato is a Scout camp located at Huntington Lake in Lakeshore, CA (Fresno County). The site was previously a pair of Jewish resident camps known as Camp Kelowa for Boys and Camp Singing Trail for Girls, which are now known as Camp Tawonga. In 1942, the camp was converted to a Boy Scout camp. The camp's property ranges in elevation from 7,000 to just under 8,000 feet (2,400 m) above sea level. Camp Oljato is primarily accessible by pontoon boats; these boats run on a regular schedule during the Scout camping season running from mid June to mid August.

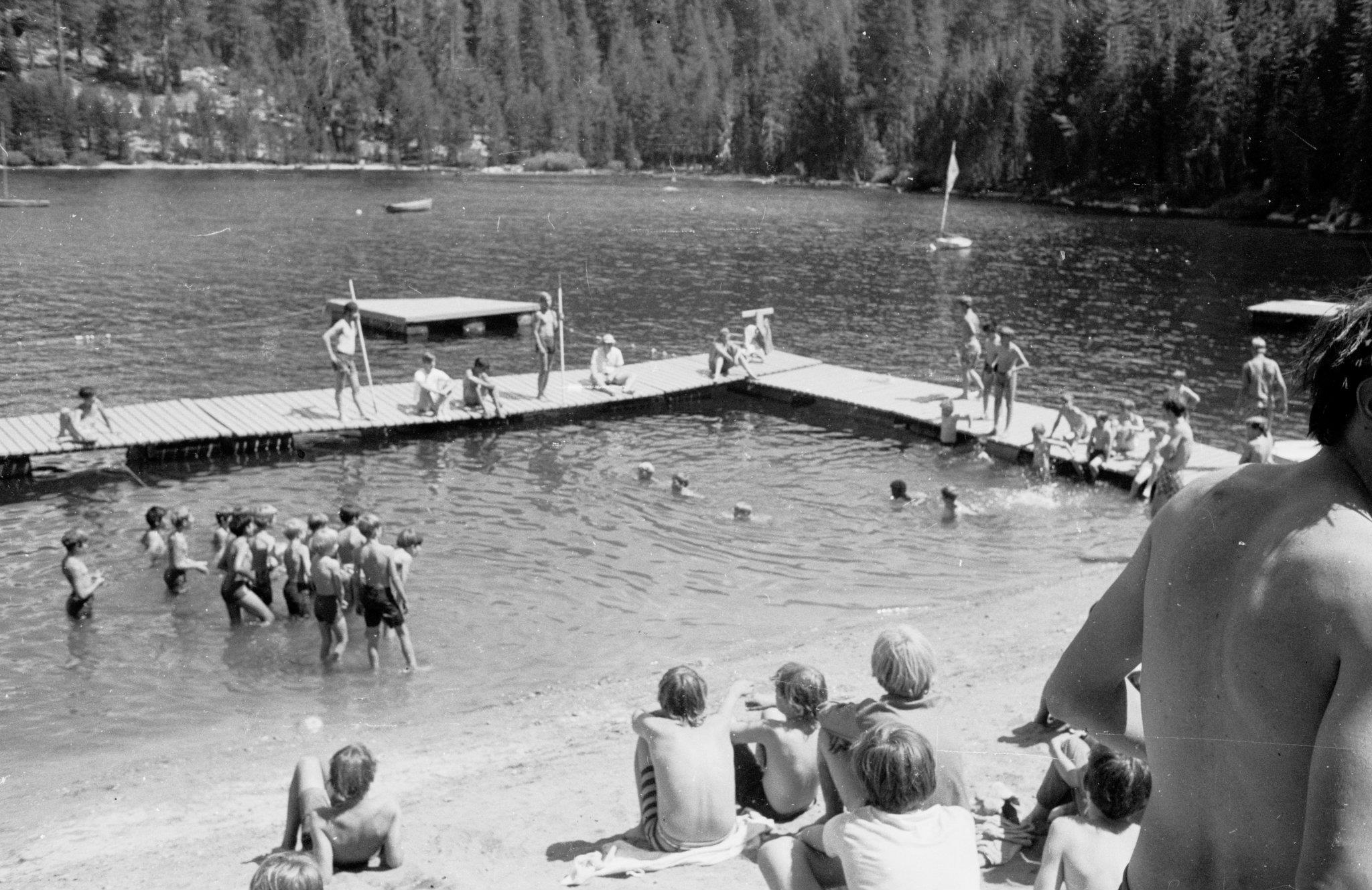
The swimming area at Camp Oljato, about 1973.

== Order of the Arrow ==
Ohlone Lodge #63 serves as the Order of the Arrow lodge for the Pacific Skyline Council. It was formed on January 1, 1995, with the merger of the Pomponio and Stanford-Oljato lodges. The lodge is named in honor of the Ohlone tribes of Native Americans. The lodge's totem is the California sea otter.

== See also ==
- Scouting in California
