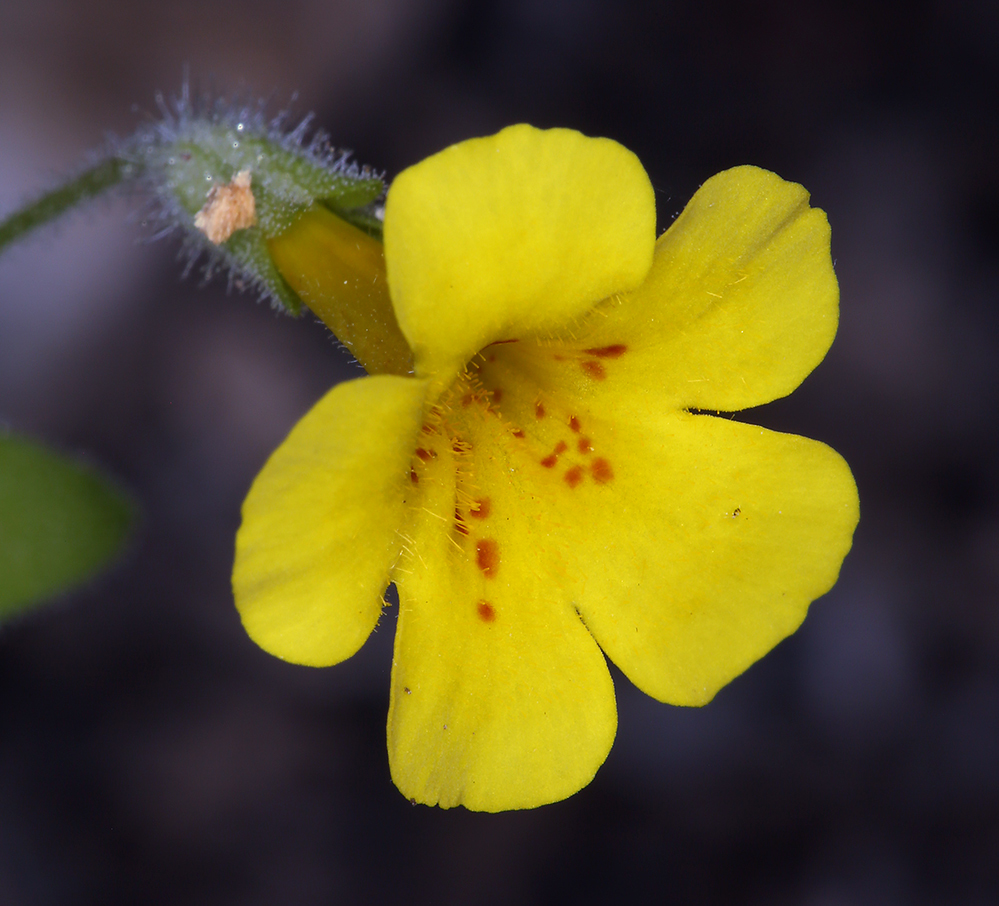
- Fresno County, California, 2018

Conservation status
- Vulnerable (NatureServe)

Scientific classification
- Kingdom: Plantae
- Clade: Embryophytes
- Clade: Tracheophytes
- Clade: Angiosperms
- Clade: Eudicots
- Clade: Asterids
- Order: Lamiales
- Family: Phrymaceae
- Genus: Erythranthe
- Species: E. arenaria

Binomial name
- Erythranthe arenaria (A.L.Grant) G.L.Nesom (2012)

Synonyms
- Mimulus arenarius A.L.Grant (1925)

= Erythranthe arenaria =

Species of plant

Erythranthe arenaria, formerly Mimulus arenarius, also known as sand-loving monkeyflower, is a species of flowering plant. This plant is native to eastern California in the United States, where it is found in the central and southern Sierra Nevada mountains. Sand-loving monkeyflower is usually found in "sandy flats, sand bars, washes, seasonal creek beds" in the foothills and the High Sierra.

The type specimen was collected from near Huntington Lake in Fresno County, in 1917. This plant was moved from the genus Mimulus to the genus Erythranthe in 2012.

== See also ==
- Ecology of the Sierra Nevada
