= China Peak =

Ski resort in California, United States

- Location in California China Peak (the United States)
- Location: Chinese Peak
- Nearest city: Lakeshore, California
- Coordinates: 37.2297°N 119.1583°W
- Top elevation: 8,709 ft (2,655 m)
- Base elevation: 7,030 ft (2,140 m)
- Skiable area: 1,200 acres (490 ha)
- Trails: 45
- Longest run: 2.25 mi (3.62 km) (Academy)
- Lift system: 9 lifts: 2 quads, 4 triples, 1 handle tow, 2 moving carpets
- Terrain parks: The Park, Ullmann's Alley
- Snowfall: 300 in (760 cm)
- Snowmaking: extensive
- Night skiing: None
- Website: www.SkiChinaPeak.com

China Peak, briefly renamed Sierra Summit, is a ski area in Central California, near Fresno. It opened in 1958, and was named at that time after the mountain, Chinese Peak.

== Location and terrain ==
China Peak is located on the south shore of Huntington Lake, about 70 miles (110 km) northeast of Fresno. It has 1,200 acres (4.9 km^{2}) of skiable terrain, with 40% of it covered by snowmaking. The mountain has a vertical rise of 1,700 from base to top, and a maximum elevation of 8,700 feet.

As of the 2025-2026 season, China Peak is on the Cali Pass.

== History ==
China Peak opened in 1958. The original owner was Knut Flint. Flint recognized the skiers in the San Joaquin Valley would have to drive to Lake Tahoe or Badger Pass, since there were no other resorts on the southwest side of the Sierras. He recruited Herbert Schwarz, an Austrian immigrant with ski industry experience to be the general manager. He coordinated the permitting, construction, start-up and operations. During this time the Forest Service was quite receptive to development in the Sierras.

The first chairlift was installed during the summer of 1958. At the time it was the longest chairlift in the U.S. at over one mile, including a midway station. It was manufactured by Riblet Lift Company based in Washington state, using what was then some very novel design concepts. This included support towers that were not vertical but rather 90 degrees to the ground surface. The chairs were attached to the cable by weaving a bar into the center of the cable. This eliminated the uncomfortable bump when chairs passed over tower wheels due to the typical external clamp design. Since there was no power available in the area a large diesel generator and fuel tank with fuel capacity for the entire season were hauled to the summit. This also required that someone either stay on top or take the Tucker snow-cat up to start the generator and chairlift each day. Boyd Turner was the construction manager, but not a skier, living in Shaver Lake. He would volunteer with others to man the top station during that first year.

The first year was relatively successful, but it had been recognized that the lack of sleeping and food facilities in the area limited attendance. Most people drove up from Fresno via the Toll House road which was a long haul. Schwarz had set up a very simple snack bar and rental hut at the base and lived in a cabin near Shaver Lake, some 18.9 miles (30.4 km) away. So a lodge was developed by architect Art Lavanino. Flint wanted a first class facility including an outdoor pool. A simple dorm was also added for staff and some guests. This was a costly investment closely following the original infrastructure. To give the resort greater presence, Schwarz recruited a well known Austrian ski school director to offer instruction on the latest skiing techniques

The hotel was completed just in time for one of the heaviest winter snow falls in local history. Schwarz had become good friends with the road department, but they were not prepared for this. After one big snow fall he would have to follow a snow blower for many hours just to reach the resort. The dorm collapsed due to snow weight that year. Worst of all skiers could not reach the resort during much of the winter. Without the revenue the resort declared bankruptcy and in 1960-61 was taken over by others.

In 1964, Joe Weirick and his father purchased China Peak Ski Resort near Huntington Lake where he managed and operated the resort for nearly 15 years. During his time at China Peak, Weirick and his wife Joanna were able to significantly grow the resort, adding additional chairlifts, a snowmaking system, and new buildings.

In 1981 the resort was purchased by the Snow Summit company and the name was changed to Sierra Summit before the 1982-1983 season. During this period, it was operated by Dick Kun. In the spring of 2010 it was sold to Tim Cohee and the original China Peak name was restored beginning in the 2010-2011 season. From 2010 to 2022, Cohee has been the CEO and general manager. In December 2022, China Peak was sold to Karl Kapuscinski who is the current owner of Mountain High and Dodge Ridge Mountain Resort.

In 2020, the Creek Fire damaged part of the resort, but it reopened on time for the 2021-2022 season.
