= Creek Fire =

2020 wildfire in Central California

- Part of the 2020 California wildfires
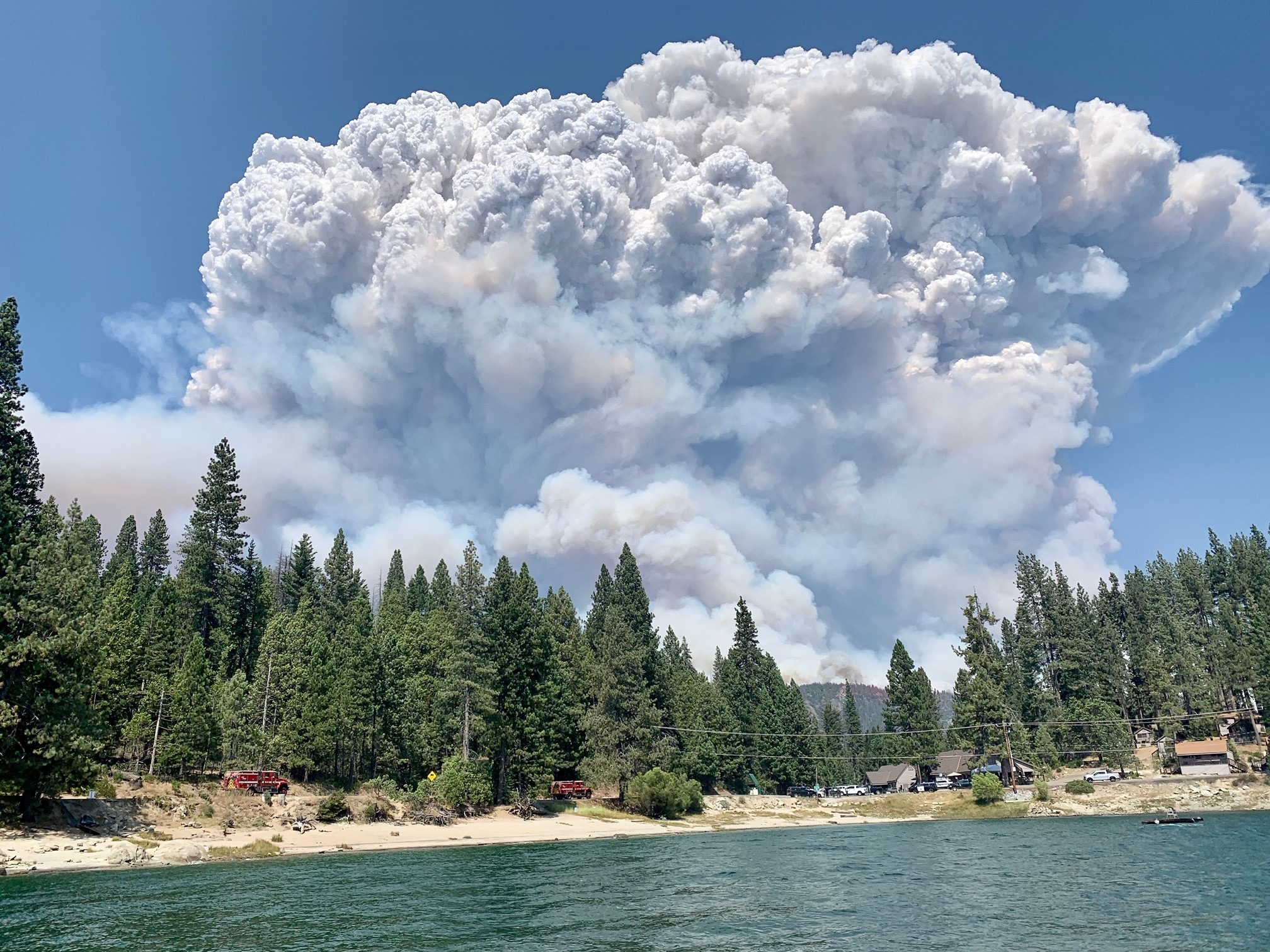
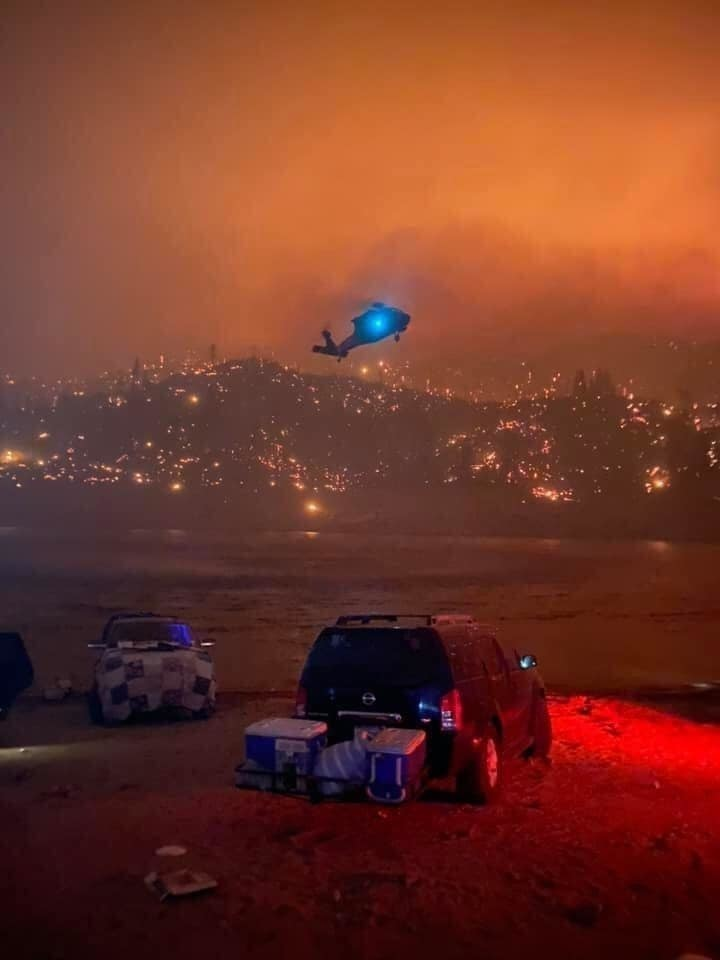
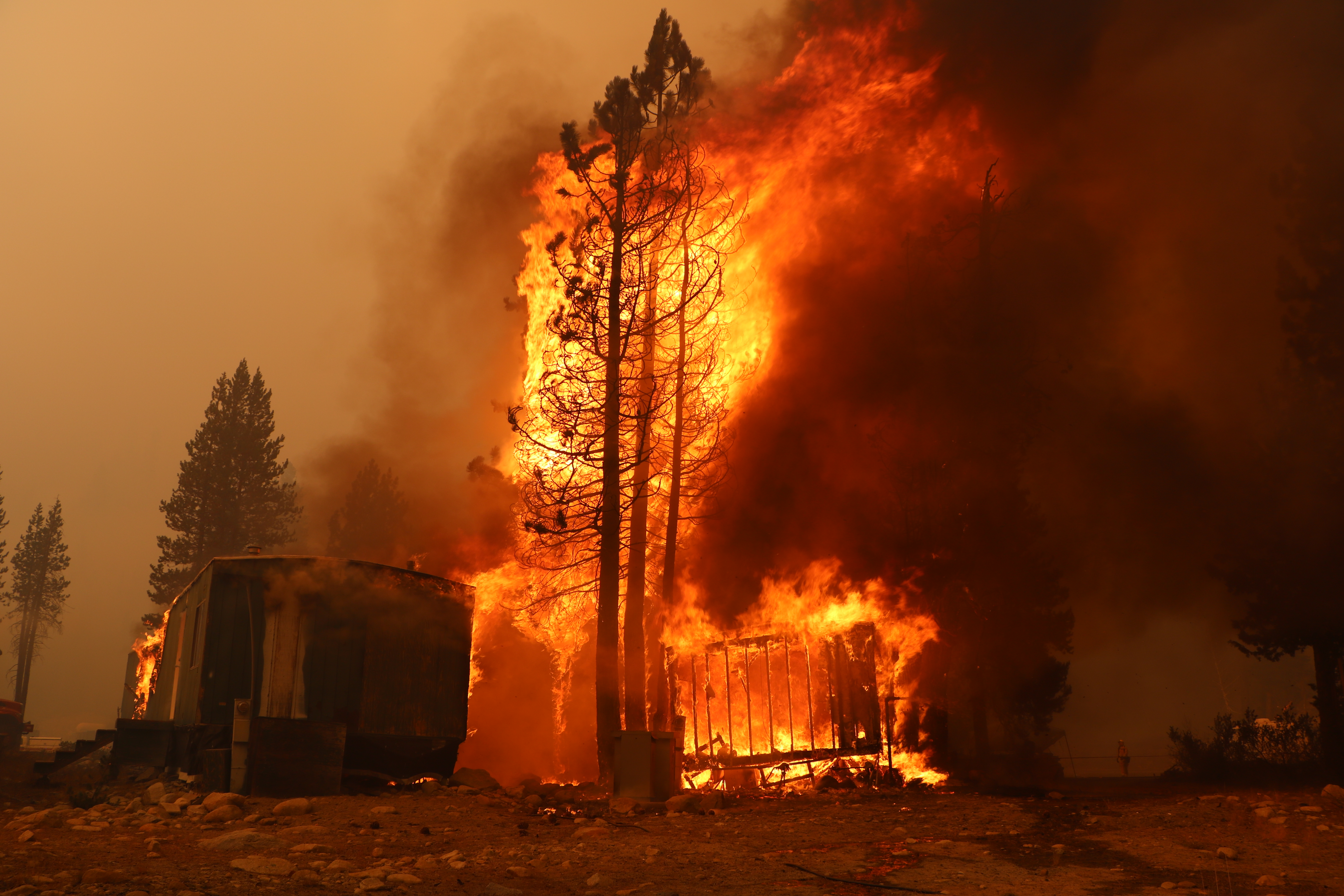
- Top: The Creek Fire's smoke plume; Bottom left: A National Guard helicopter hovers above Mammoth Pool Reservoir; Bottom right: The fire burns trees and a manufactured home on September 8, 2020
- Date: September 4 –; December 24, 2020; (112 days)
- Location: Fresno County & Madera County, Central California, United States
- Coordinates: 37.19147°N 119.261175°W

Statistics
- Total area: 379,895 acres (153,738 ha; 594 sq mi; 1,537 km^{2})

Impacts
- Deaths: 0
- Injuries: 26 (12 campers and 14 firefighters)
- Evacuated: >30,000
- Structures destroyed: 856
- Cost: >$500 million (2020 USD)

Ignition
- Cause: Undetermined

Map
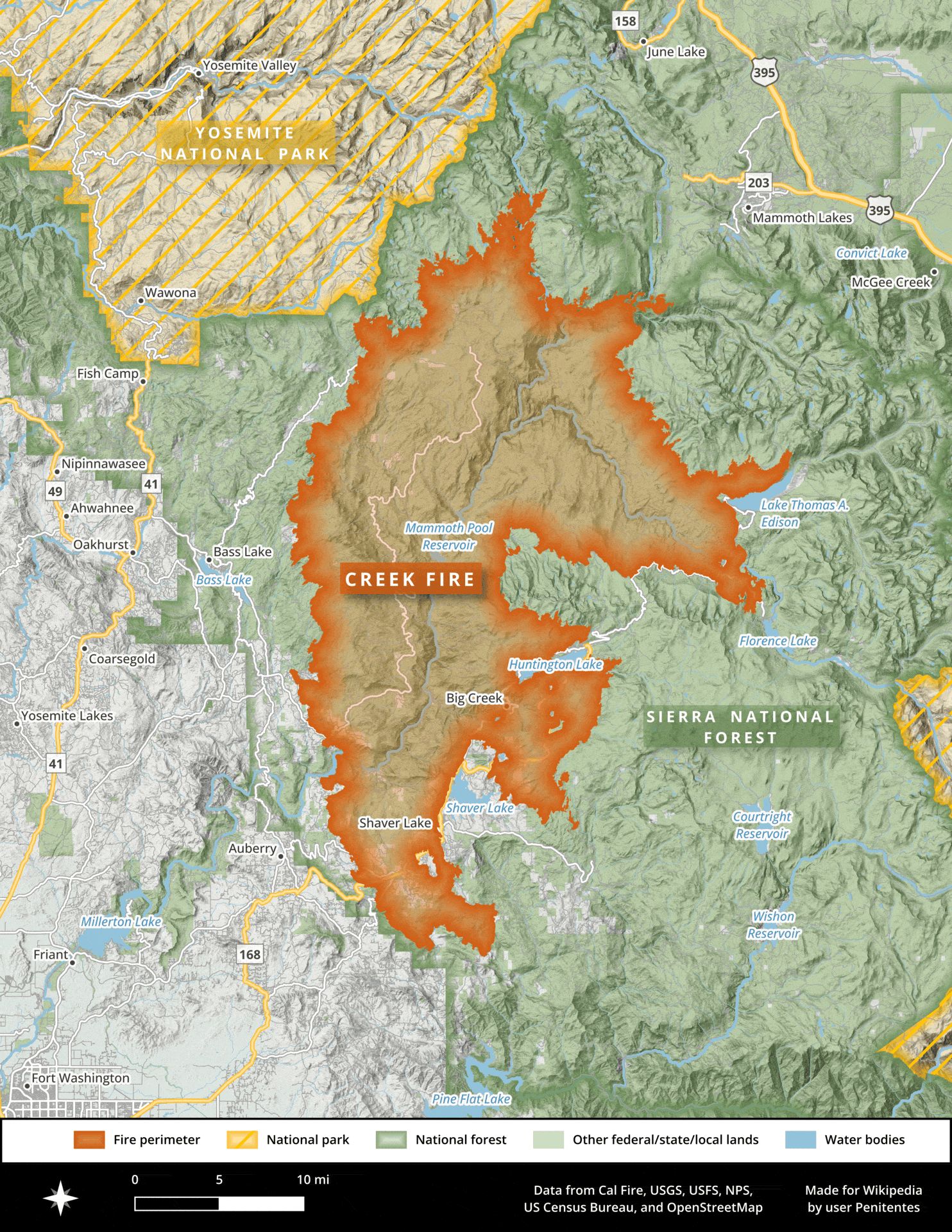
- The footprint of the Creek Fire, with Yosemite National Park at top and Fresno at bottom left

- The general location of the Creek Fire in central California

The 2020 Creek Fire was a very large wildfire in central California's Sierra National Forest, in Fresno and Madera counties. One of the most significant fires of California's record-setting 2020 wildfire season, it began on September 4, 2020, and burned 379,895 acres (153,738 ha) over several months until it was declared 100% contained on December 24, 2020. The Creek Fire is the sixth-largest wildfire in recorded California history and the third-largest single fire—i.e. not part of a larger wildfire complex—following the 2021 Dixie Fire.

Tens of thousands of residents in Fresno and Madera counties were forced to evacuate, and the fire also necessitated the helicopter rescue of hundreds of people by the California National Guard after they became trapped at Mammoth Pool Reservoir. Despite this, the fire caused zero fatalities, though there were more than twenty injuries. The Creek Fire destroyed hundreds of structures in Sierra Nevada communities, adding up to 856 buildings destroyed and dozens more damaged. The combined cost of the months-long firefighting effort and damage to private and county property exceeded $500 million.

== Background ==
The Creek Fire occurred amid an already quite active wildfire season in California, which until early September had largely been driven by an outbreak of dry thunderstorms in mid-August. Between August 15 and September 9 alone, more than 1.6 million acres (650,000 ha) had burned, more than five times California's average acreage burned by that date. Over Labor Day weekend, the state suffered "one of its hottest weekends in memory", leading the National Weather Service to issue widespread heat advisories and red flag warnings. The first two days of the Creek Fire's growth saw abnormally hot and dry conditions for the region.

The Creek Fire burned largely in the Sierra National Forest, which spans more than 1.3 million acres (530,000 ha) at an elevation range of ~900–14,000 feet (270–4,270 m). The burn area largely comprised mixed coniferous forest containing ponderosa pine, sugar pine, white fir, incense-cedar, and California black oak trees. Bark beetle infestation and California's drought between 2012 and 2016 killed almost 150 million trees in the Sierra Nevada, including more than 36 million trees in the Sierra National Forest alone between 2015 and 2019—the most of any national forest in California. Tree mortality rates reached 80% in what became the Creek Fire footprint. The U.S. Forest Service estimated that dead stands of trees that burned in the fire contained 2,000 tons of fuel for every one acre (0.40 ha).

== Progression ==
GOES-17 satellite imagery of a pyrocumulonimbus cloud exploding above the Creek Fire on September 5

=== September 4–5 ===
According to the U.S. Forest Service, the Creek Fire began at approximately 6:45 p.m. PDT on Friday, September 4, 2020, in the Big Creek drainage area between Shaver Lake, Big Creek, and Huntington Lake, California. The fire had burned 2,000 acres (810 ha) by the following morning and 5,000 acres (2,000 ha) by that afternoon.

Driven by powerful diurnal up-canyon winds within the San Joaquin River drainage, the Creek Fire quickly became a firestorm. Roughly eighteen hours after the fire had begun, the Creek Fire began producing a pyrocumulonimbus cloud, which, observed by radar and satellite, became one of the largest such events on record in the United States, or even North America. (Note: From the Lee, Mirocha, Laureau, et al. source: "...superlative pyroCb depth (the deepest on record for North America in a decades-long community archive of pyroCbs...) From the NASA source: “The pyrocumulonimbus cloud created aerosol index values indicate that this is one of the largest (if not the largest) pyroCb events seen in the United States...") The fire was fed in part by these cloud formations, which generated downdrafts that supplied the fire with additional oxygen and pushed it across fire lines. The fire has been characterized as a plume-dominated blaze, where the environment allows for the continued upward blowing of smoke and the vertical transfer of heat, causing extreme fire behavior, such as multiple fire tornadoes observed using Doppler weather radar data.

The Creek Fire also spawned two fire tornadoes on September 5; the first was rated EF2 with 125-mile-per-hour (201 km/h) winds near Huntington Lake, and the second was rated EF1 with 100-mile-per-hour (160 km/h) winds near Mammoth Pool. Damage included uprooted pine trees as well as stripped bark. These "firenadoes" formed due to the intense heat the fire had generated, which pulled in air, creating rotational vortices. The Mammoth Pool firenado trapped hundreds of campers in the area, while the Huntington Lake one caused severe damage to trees in the Camp Silver Fir, B.S.A. & Kennolyn Camps area.

The fire had initially trapped about 1,000 people near Mammoth Pool Reservoir after it jumped the San Joaquin River, with at least 200 trapped at a boat launch. The California National Guard, using CH-47 Chinook and UH-60 Black Hawk helicopters and night goggles, flew multiple sorties to evacuate people from near Mammoth Pool Reservoir. The Chinook flew three flights, carrying 67, 102, and 37 people each time (not including crew). The Black Hawk flew another three times, carrying 15, 22, and 21 people each time. Evacuees were taken to the California Army National Guard base at the Fresno Yosemite International Airport and were triaged on the tarmac before being transported to local hospitals or temporary shelters.

=== September 6–9 ===
Within the first four days, the Creek Fire rapidly exploded, expanding anywhere between 20,000 acres (81 km^{2}) to 50,000 acres (200 km^{2}) each day from September 4–9. Reasons for this explosive behavior included strong, gusty winds pushing east from the Central Valley into the Sierra Nevada and a pileup of dead trees due to the 2011–17 California drought and subsequent bark beetle infestation.

=== September 10 onwards ===
Thick smoke lying over the fire, as well as reduced winds and lower temperatures, allowed firefighters to notch six percent containment by September 10.

With over 290,000 acres (1,200 km^{2}) burned on September 23, the Creek Fire became the largest single blaze (i.e. not a wildfire complex) in the history of California, though it was surpassed just one year later by the 2021 Dixie Fire in Northern California.

Over the next month, the Creek Fire continued to grow in size, exceeding 300,000 acres (120,000 ha) on September 27. In October, most of the new growth in the Creek Fire was coming from the eastern flank of the fire, which was expanding towards Mono Hot Springs and Lake Thomas A Edison. On October 26, the Creek Fire had grown to 369,362 acres (149,475 ha), while containment was at 63 percent.

The fire was fully contained on December 24.

== Cause ==
The U.S. Forest Service Law Enforcement and Investigations department led the investigation into the cause of the Creek Fire, with assistance from the California Department of Forestry and Fire Protection (Cal Fire). On July 16, 2021, the U.S. Forest Service announced that the results of its months-long investigation into the cause of the Creek Fire had been inconclusive. According to Dean Gould, the supervisor of the Sierra National Forest, investigators "spent countless hours hiking rugged terrain to determine the cause, interviewed numerous leads, and eliminated multiple potential causes." The Forest Service ruled out that the fire had been sparked by equipment use, an escaped campfire, powerlines, or spontaneous combustion, among multiple other discarded possibilities. Investigators judged that the "most probable cause" of the fire was a lightning strike, but noted that they could not rule out arson or smoking. The lightning strike assessment was substantiated by a Douglas fir snag, bearing signs of lightning damage, that early-arriving firefighters had seen going up in flames. The Creek Fire's cause is officially listed as "undetermined".

== Effects ==
An interactive map of the Creek Fire's perimeter

There were no fatalities in the Creek Fire; an early report of one death by the Fresno Fire Department never materialized. Twenty of those trapped at Mammoth Pool Reservoir were injured, and some were taken to hospitals after the evacuation flights. Two people, including a 14-year-old girl, were badly burned and initially in "very serious condition". Other injuries ranged from abrasions to broken bones.

=== Damage ===
The cost of the Creek Fire exceeded $500 million. The Sierra National Forest calculated the cost of fighting the fire at $193 million, and Fresno County Supervisor Nathan Magsig put the cost of private property damage at no less than $250 million and the cost of damage to county assets (such as roads) at $20–30 million.

The Creek Fire destroyed 856 structures and damaging a further 71. Half the homes in Big Creek were reported to have been destroyed by the fire.

On September 17, the Boy Scouts of America - Southern Sierra Council announced that the fire had badly damaged Camp Kern, with some significant structures fully destroyed by the fire.

On September 9, at least 60 homes were destroyed and 278 commercial-residential structures were destroyed along with the historic Cressman's General Store, a local-landmark. On September 9, the fire reached explosives stored by the China Peak Mountain Resort, used to control avalanches. The cache exploded, doing some damage to the resort. Firefighters had been warned of the cache and evacuated prior to the fire reaching the explosive materials, and no injuries resulted.

=== Closures and evacuations ===
On September 5, hours after the fire broke out, the Fresno County Sheriff's Office closed Shaver Lake, a popular destination for boating and camping. The California Highway Patrol also shut down California State Route 168 for access only to emergency responders and evacuees.

On September 7, California governor Gavin Newsom issued a state of emergency for the Creek Fire in the Fresno, Madera, and Mariposa counties, as the fire crossed State Route 168 and was rapidly moving southward, threatening the community of Shaver Lake. The town of Big Creek was already decimated on September 5. 1,000 firefighters were called to fight this fire, which was already 78,000 acres (320 km^{2}) large with no containment, moving quickly towards cabins, homes, and shops.

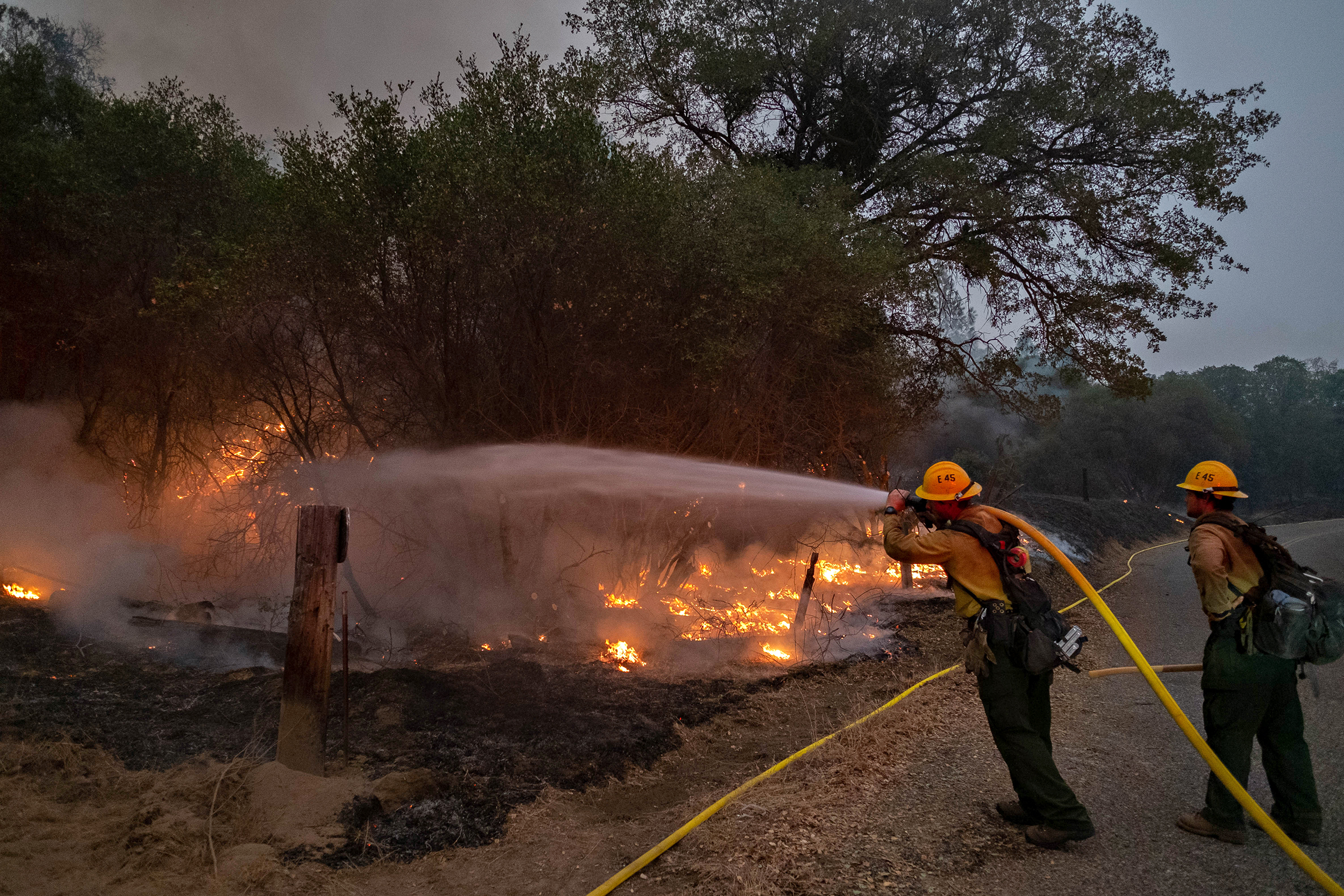
Firefighters extinguish a controlled burn to stop the spread of the Creek Fire

A color-coded map of the Creek Fire's day-by-day progression as of October 26, 2020

Scores of people were airlifted from hiking trails within the Sierra National Forest in the early days of the fire, with at least 150 people and some dogs evacuated by September 8.

Evacuations were issued in North Fork, Bass Lake, Big Creek, Shaver, Huntington Lake, Tollhouse and Auberry, California.

By September 22, the fire had forced the evacuation of over 30,000 people in Fresno and Madera Counties.

Multiple organizations and locations housed pets and livestock during the evacuations, such as the Fresno Fairgrounds, Clovis Rodeo Grounds and local high schools. The Red Cross organized hotel rooms for evacuees; group shelters were not an available option due to COVID-19 pandemic social distancing requirements.

Two people were arrested for entering evacuation zones illegally on September 9.

=== Environmental impacts ===
Smoke from the fire worsened the air quality in the Central Valley area and caused an increase in at-risk individuals and children to be affected by respiratory issues and an increase in the use and prescribing of inhalers.

A study published in Forest Ecology and Management in 2022 found that 41% of the area burned in the Creek Fire did so at high severity, 35% at moderate severity, 21% at low severity, and 3% at a severity that left the area unchanged.

=== Political response ===
On September 15, Gavin Newsom and California senator Kamala Harris travelled to Fresno County to survey fire damage. They were met with both supporters and protestors. They talked to first responders about their efforts to fight the fire, as well as wildfire evacuees. Forrest mis-management and neglect was never addressed. An Auberry family accused the pair of using their property for photo-op purposes before even the family themselves could survey the damage.

== Growth and containment ==
Fire containment status Gray: contained; Red: active; %: percent contained;
Date	Area burned (in acres)	Personnel	Containment
Sep 5	36,000	...	
Sep 6	73,278	...	
Sep 7	78,790	...	
Sep 8	152,833	...	
Sep 9	163,138	...	
Sep 10	175,893	...	
Sep 11	182,225	...	
Sep 12	196,667	...	
Sep 13	201,908	2,301 personnel	
Sep 14	212,744	...	
Sep 15	228,025	...	
Sep 16	220,025	2,878 personnel	
Sep 17	246,756	...	
Sep 18	248,256	2,978 personnel	
Sep 19	271,938	...	
Sep 20	278,368	2,915 personnel	
Sep 21	280,425	...	
Sep 22	283,724	3,171 personnel	
Sep 23	286,519	3,106 personnel	
Sep 24	291,426	3,075 personnel	
Sep 25	291,426	3,085 personnel	
Sep 26	292,172	3,263 personnel	
Sep 27	302,870	3,263 personnel	
Sep 28	304,640	3,172 personnel	
Sep 29	305,204	3,675 personnel	
Sep 30	307,051	1,837 personnel	
Oct 1	309,033	1,919 personnel	
Oct 2	311,703	1,974 personnel	
Oct 3	313,044	...	
Oct 4	316,673	...	
Oct 5	322,089	...	
Oct 6	326,706	...	
Oct 7	328,595	...	
Oct 8	330,899	...	
Oct 9	331,954	...	
Oct 10	333,350	...	
Oct 11	333,350	...	
Oct 12	333,350	...	
Oct 13	337,655	...	
Oct 14	337,655	1,369 personnel	
Oct 15	341,722	964 personnel	
Oct 16	344,042	987 personnel	
Oct 17	346,477	983 personnel	
Oct 18	348,085	...	
Oct 19	350,331	...	
Oct 20	352,339	...	
...	...	...	...
Oct 22	357,656	...	
...	...	...	...
Oct 25	360,834	...	
Oct 26	369,362	...	
Oct 27	374,466	...	
Oct 28	378,701	...	
...	...	...	...
Nov 1	380,345	961 personnel	
Nov 2	380,663	865 personnel	
Nov 3	378,201	878 personnel	
Nov 4	378,730	896 personnel	
...	...	...	...
Nov 7	379,716	868 personnel	
...	...	...	...
Nov 13	379,802	428 personnel	
Nov 14	379,802	428 personnel	
Nov 15	379,802	356 personnel	
Nov 16	379,895	335 personnel	
Nov 17	379,895	361 personnel	
Nov 18	379,895	286 personnel	
Nov 19	379,895	235 personnel	
Nov 20	379,895	230 personnel	
...	...	...	...
Dec 24	379,895	...	

== See also ==
- List of California wildfires
