= Chinese Peak (California) =

Mountain in California

- Location within California Location within the United States

Highest point
- Elevation: 8,695 ft (2,650 m)
- Prominence: 305 ft (93 m)
- Coordinates: 37°13′8.46″N 119°9′16.97″W

Geography
- Location: Fresno County, California, United States
- Parent range: Sierra Nevada
- Topo map: USGS Huntington Lake

Chinese Peak is a summit in Fresno County, California, in the United States. With an elevation of 8,705 feet (2,653 m), Chinese Peak is the 842nd highest summit in the state of California. China Peak ski area is situated on the mountain.

The mountain was named for Yung Lee, a local Chinese shepherd.
