= Chinese Peak (Idaho) =

Mountain in the United States of America

- Location within Idaho

Highest point
- Elevation: 6,791 ft (2,070 m); NAVD88
- Prominence: 1191 ft (363 m)
- Isolation: 5.85 mi (9.41 km)
- Listing: North America highest peaks; US highest major peaks; Idaho peaks 1069th
- Coordinates: 42°50′56″N 112°21′47″W

Geography
- Location: High point of Rocky Mountains and Bannock County, Idaho, U.S.
- Parent range: Portneuf Range, List of mountain ranges of Idaho of the Pocatello range.
- Topo map(s): USGS 7.5' topographic map Chinese Peak, Idaho

Geology
- Mountain type

Climbing
- Easiest route: Bicycle route

Chinese Peak is a summit in Bannock County, Idaho, in the United States. This peak is the highest point in the portion of the Portneuf Range called the Pocatello Range. With an elevation of 6,791 feet (2,070 m), Chinese Peak is the 1069th highest summit in the state of Idaho. The peak is a fire lookout site and a road/bike trail leads to the top.

Formerly called Chinks Peak, the summit was named for a Chinese man who died near the summit in the 1890s. Following controversy over the use of ethnic slur "chink", the name was officially changed by the Geographic Names Information System in 2001.
