= Huntington Lake =

Reservoir in California, US

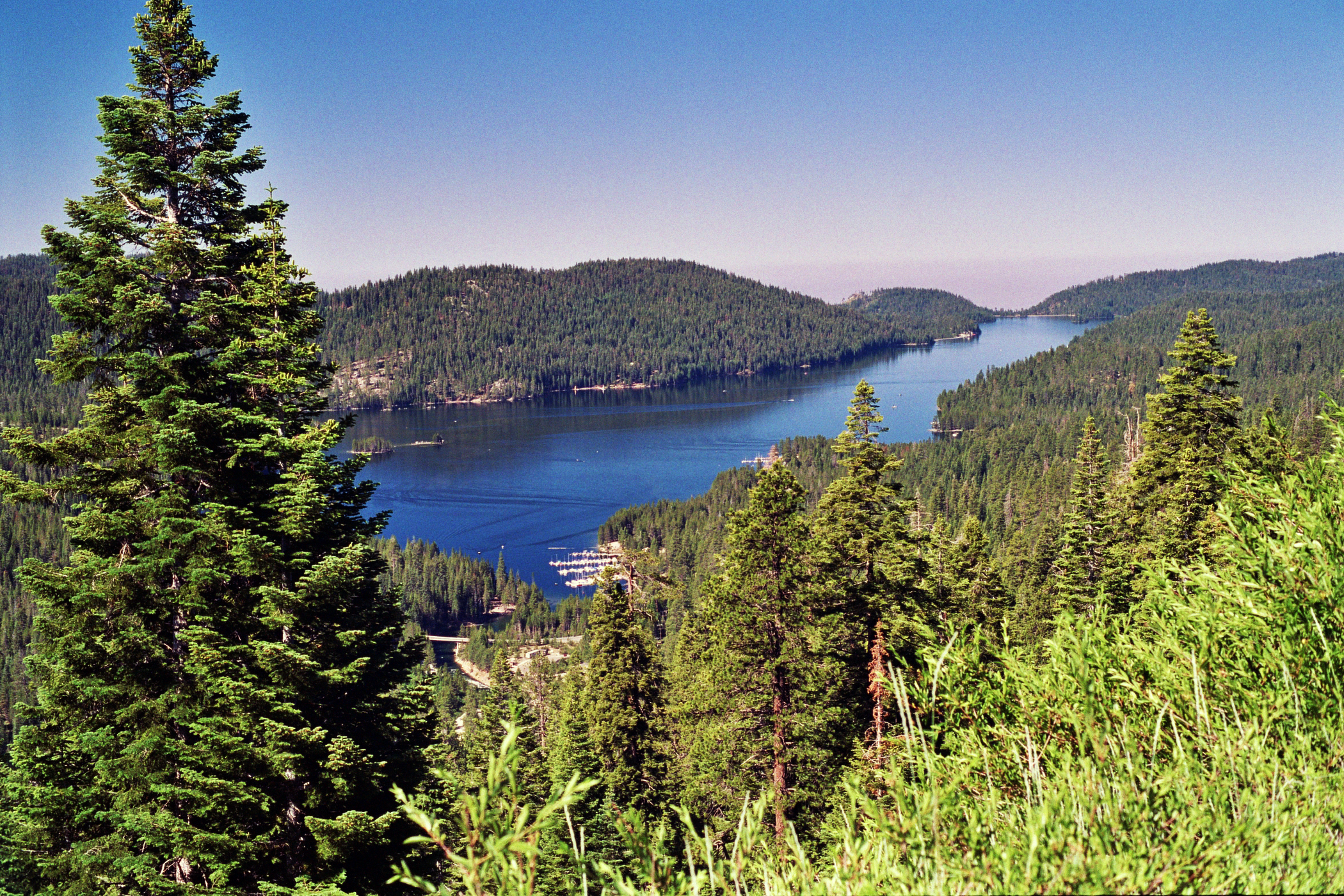

- Location within California Location within the United States
- Location: Fresno County, California
- Coordinates: 37°14′N 119°12′W
- Type: Reservoir
- Primary inflows: Big Creek
- Primary outflows: Big Creek
- Basin countries: United States
- Surface area: 1,441 acres (583 ha)
- Surface elevation: 2,120 m (6,955 ft)

Huntington Lake is a reservoir in Fresno County, California on Big Creek, located in the Sierra Nevada at an elevation of 6,955 feet (2,120 m). The lake receives water from Southern California Edison's Big Creek Hydroelectric Project, as well as the many streams that flow into the lake. Some water leaving the lake flows to Big Creek, while some is diverted to nearby Shaver Lake. The lake is home to a variety of recreational activities, including camping, horse-back riding, skiing, sailing, fishing and more. It is drained and refilled through the Big Creek dam system each year, with winter water levels often dipping below 50 percent of the lake's capacity.

== History ==
=== Construction ===
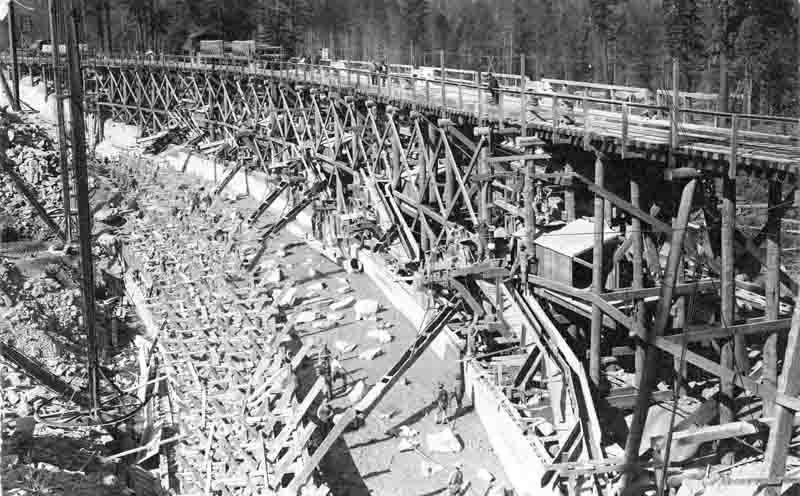
Construction underway in the Big Creek Hydroelectric Project in 1912

Huntington Lake was constructed in 1912 as a part of the enormous Big Creek Hydroelectric Project envisioned by John S. Eastwood to provide power for a growing California. The lake was named for Henry Edwards Huntington, the railroad magnate who financed the earliest work to develop the Big Creek project which includes a system of lakes, tunnels, steel penstocks and power houses.

Four dams form the lake, which has a capacity of 88,834 acre-feet (109,575 dam^{3}) and a surface area of 1,441 acres (583 ha). There were originally three dams, completed in 1913, but a fourth dam, completed in 1919, was built to increase the lake's capacity. The other three dams were raised and covered with concrete. State Route 168 passes along the east shore of the lake where China Peak, a ski resort, is located.

On December 6, 1943, a B-24 bomber with six men aboard crashed into Huntington Lake. The crew had taken off from nearby Hammer Field in Fresno, California to search for a second B-24 which had disappeared a day earlier during a night training flight. Two members of the original eight man crew, a radio operator and the co-pilot, bailed out of the troubled plane and survived. Some have speculated that the pilot may have mistaken the lake for a sierra meadow and tried to make an emergency landing during a snow storm. The wreckage of the plane, and the remains of its crew were discovered by a survey team in August 1955, when the lake had been drained for dam repairs. The original B-24 they had been searching for was discovered in July 1960 in Hester Lake, a small body of water in a remote area not far from Huntington. Neither plane has been recovered.

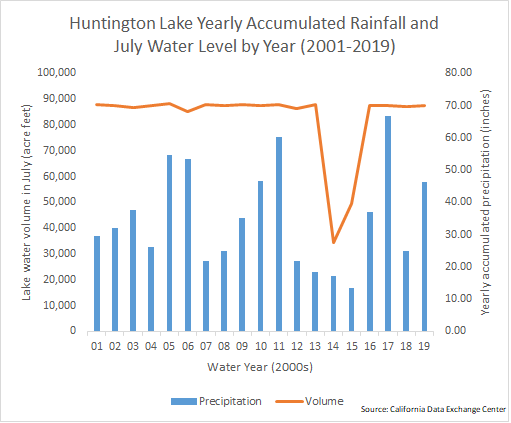
The effects of the drought were drastic on the lake — peak season water levels were reduced to lower than half of normal as rainfall sharply declined.

=== Impact of the 2012–2013 North American drought ===
Water levels in the lake began falling during the 2012–2013 North American drought. By July 2014, the lake was at a third of its normal level, and the High Sierra Regatta was canceled for the first time in 60 years.

== Recreation ==
Water levels and weather drastically change at the lake between summer and winter—while nearly uninhabitable in the winter, it is a popular recreation location in the summer.

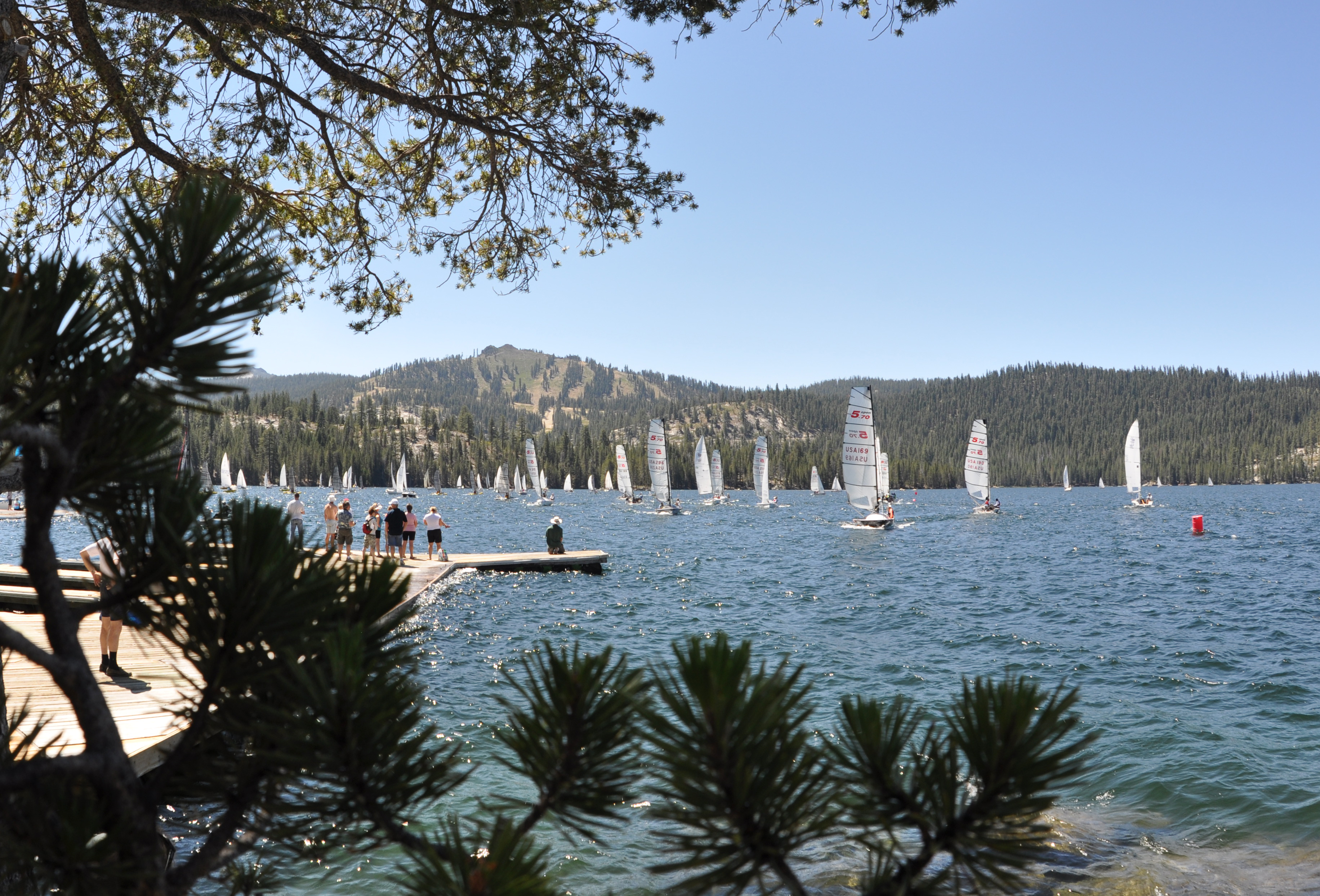
High Sierra Regatta

=== Sailing ===
Due to Huntington Lake being 5 miles (8.0 km) long, and having steady winds of about 15 mph (24 km/h), it is a favorable location for sailing. Many regattas have been held there, including the North American Sailing Championships. Additionally, Huntington Lake is the site of the High Sierra Regatta, an annual sailing event organized by the Fresno Yacht Club.

=== Fishing ===
Anglers catch brown and rainbow trout, as well as kokanne salmon, on the lake and surrounding streams. Regulations limit the amount of fish allowed to be taken from the lake—fishers can catch and keep five fish a day, and are only allowed 10 total in possession.

=== Camping ===
There are nine campgrounds in the surrounding Huntington Lake Recreation Area: Badger Flat Campground, Billy Creek Lower Campground, Billy Creek Upper Campground, Catavee Campground, College Campground, Deer Creek Campground, Kinnikinnick Campground, Rancheria Campground, and West Kaiser Campground. West Kaiser is a first come first served site, while reservations must be made for the other eight campgrounds.

=== Horse-back riding ===
D&F Pack Station, which offers horse-back riding trips into the Sierra Wilderness, operates on the lake. The outfit runs both quick, day trips as well as multi-day wilderness pack trips.

=== Snow Skiing ===
With snow levels often rising to over 50 in (130 cm) in the winter, China Peak, located above the eastern shore of the lake, is a popular ski resort in colder months. The resort has a vertical gain of 1,679 ft (512 m), with its peak at just over an elevation of 8,700 ft (2,700 m). There are seven chairlifts and over 40 ski runs.

=== Boy Scouts ===
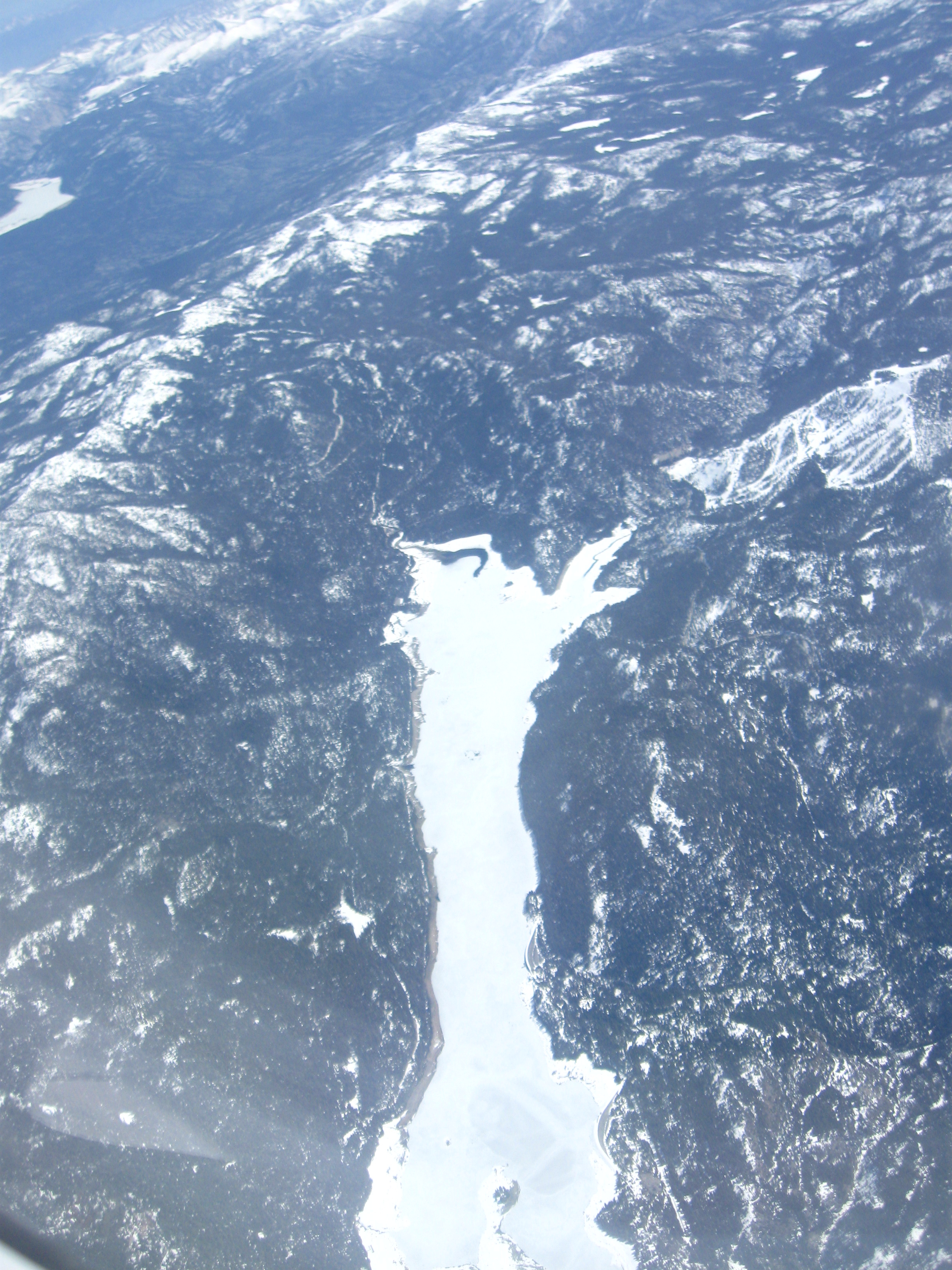
View from the air in winter

Due to its relative accessibility and semi-remote terrain, Huntington Lake is the location of many Boy Scout camps, including Boy Scout Camp Kern, operated by the Southern Sierra Council headquartered in Bakersfield, California. Additionally, Huntington Lake houses Camp Oljato, operated by Pacific Skyline Council (PacSky), along with a variety of other scouting facilities.

The former Camp Mirimichi, a Boy Scout facility operated by Sequoia Council, lies at the southern eastern shore of Huntington Lake as well.

== Housing ==
Cabins, condominiums and vacation rentals make up the real estate on the lake. There are 420 privately owned cabins – each cabin owner pays an annual fee to the United States Forest Service for a "special use permit" to use their cabin and surrounding property, as they are all built on USFS lands. Many are inaccessible in the winter except by snowmobile, while a few have their tracts plowed to the cabins.

== Map ==
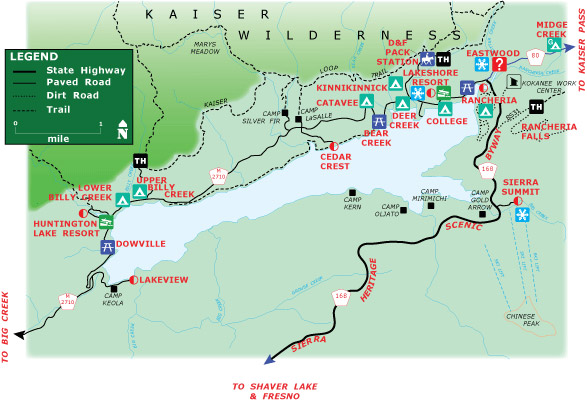

== See also ==
- Lake Thomas A Edison
- List of dams and reservoirs in California
- List of lakes in California
