= Southern Sierra Council =

Local council of Scouting America

Southern Sierra Council #030
- Owner: Scouting America
- Headquarters: Bakersfield, California
- Location: Kern, Inyo and Mono County
- Country: United States
- Founded: 1919
- Defunct: 2026
- President: Stephen Boyle
- Council Commissioner: Cindy Basham
- Scout Executive: None
- Website www.sscbsa.org

The Southern Sierra Council (#030) was a local council of the Scouting America. The council was headquartered in Bakersfield, California and served over 1,500 scouts in Cub Scout packs, Scouts BSA troops, and Explorer posts. It served Kern, Inyo, and Mono counties in California. Southern Sierra Council was the northernmost council of Area 4 in Boy Scouts of America's Western Region.

== History ==
The Southern Sierra Council was officially founded in 1919 under the name Bakersfield Council. Roland Dye was the first Scout Executive of the council, and W.J. Schultz served as the first council president.

Scouting came to Kern County in 1912 after a group of boys from the National Guard auxiliary met at Armory hall. In May of that year, a troop was formed in Taft with one of the first scoutmasters, Scotty Houston, having been an alumnus of the scouting program in England. The first troop in the city of Bakersfield was formed in March 1914 Roland Dye along with scoutmaster Arthur H. Myer. At the time of the council's foundation in 1919, scout troops formed in multiple central California cities with membership of approximately 450 boys. In 1921 the council changed its name to the Kern County Council.

In the 1930s the council acquired the 160-acre Kern River Country Club, which the council eventually sold to fund building a council office in Bakersfield. Shortly thereafter, the council's first Cub Scout pack was formed in Taft, CA. The scout office in Bakersfield was built in 1952 and still serves the area as both an administrative office as well as a trading post.

Due to the name "Kern County Council" causing confusion with other local governmental agencies, as well as the inclusion of other counties served by the council, a contest was held to create a new name for the council. On January 1, 1966, after a final selection by the executive board, the council officially became the Southern Sierra Council.

In 2026, the council had shrunk to where it was not viable as a stand alone council, and it was absorbed by the Golden Empire Council in Sacramento, the former Southern Sierra Council becoming a "service area" for the Golden Empire, which subsequently changed it's name to Greater California Council

== Organization ==
- Desert District
- Tejon District

== Council Camps ==
- Camp Kern Destroyed by fire in 2020
- Camp Mirimichi bought from Sequoia council and then later was sold
- Camp Jewett was sold in 2008

== Order of the Arrow ==
- Yowlumne Lodge #303

== See also ==
- Scouting in California
