= Lakeshore, Fresno County, California =

Unincorporated community in California, United States

Lakeshore
- Unincorporated community
- Location in California Lakeshore (the United States)
- Coordinates: 37°15′11″N 119°10′29″W
- Country: United States
- State: California
- County: Fresno
- Elevation: 6,995 ft (2,132 m)

Lakeshore is an unincorporated community in Fresno County, California, United States. It is located on the north shore of Huntington Lake, at an elevation of 6995 feet (2132 m).

The first Lakeshore post office opened in 1924.
