= List of rivers of California =

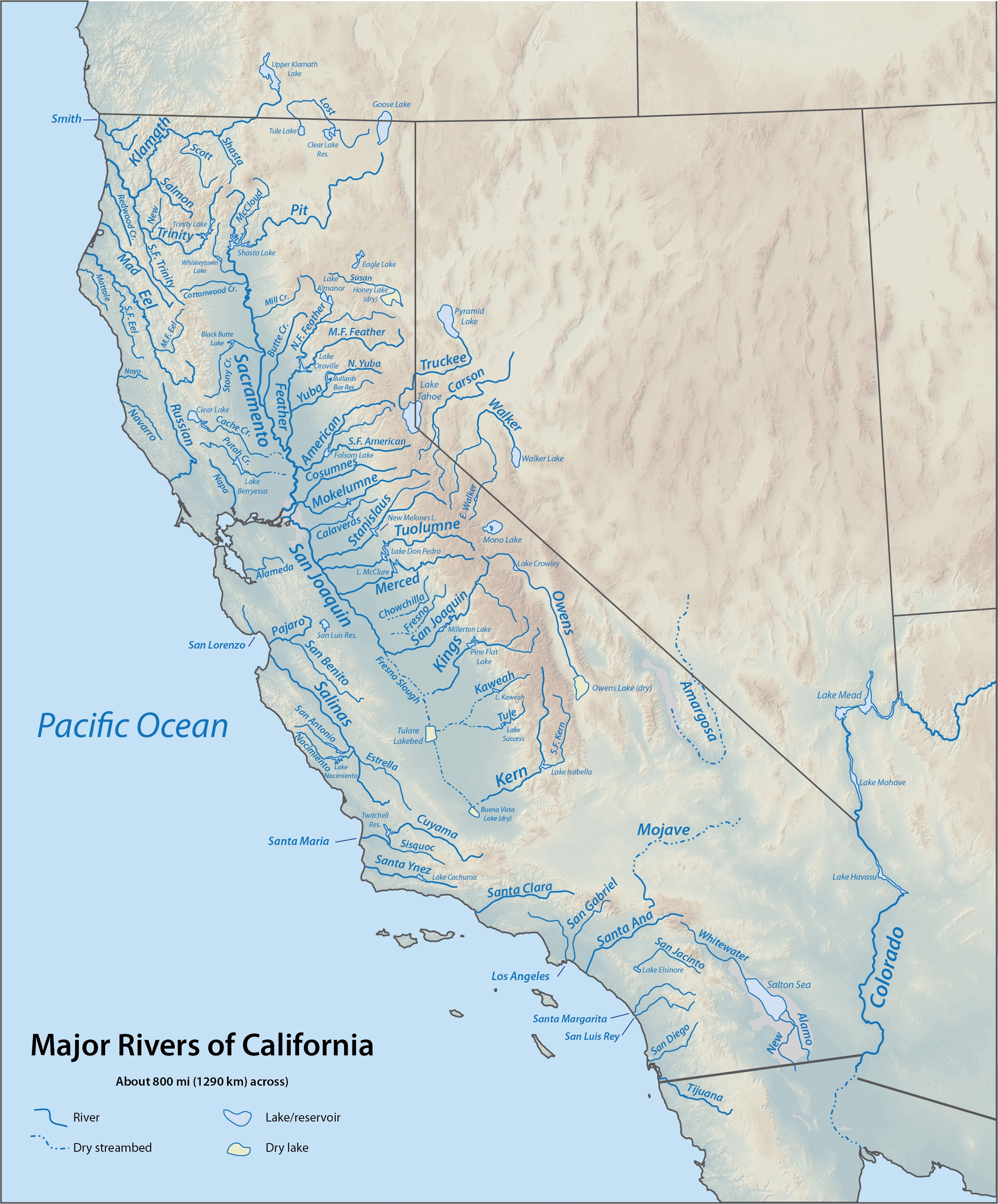
Map of some major California rivers and lakes

The US state of California has a multitude of large and small rivers. Its most prominent river system is formed by the Sacramento and San Joaquin rivers. The Klamath and Trinity Rivers drain a large area in far northwestern California. The Eel River and Salinas River each drain portions of the California coast, north and south of San Francisco Bay, respectively. The Mojave River is the primary watercourse in the Mojave Desert, and the Santa Ana River drains much of the Transverse Ranges as it bisects Southern California. The Colorado River forms the state's southeast border with Arizona.

Most of California's major rivers are dammed as part of two massive water projects: the Central Valley Project, and the California State Water Project. In August 2024, the largest dam removal project in US history, part of the Klamath Basin Restoration Agreement, was completed. The state's coasts, rivers, and other bodies of water are regulated by the California Coastal Commission.

The rivers listed here are grouped by region. Major lakes and reservoirs, if applicable, are indicated in italics.

== North Coast (north of Humboldt Bay) ==
Rivers and streams between the Oregon border and Humboldt Bay that empty into the Pacific Ocean (arranged north to south; tributaries with those entering nearest the sea first). Bold indicates rivers with more detailed lists in following sections.

- **Smith River** (jump to tributaries)
- Elk Creek
- Wilson Creek
- **Klamath River** (jump to tributaries)
- **Redwood Creek** (jump to tributaries)
- Little River
- **Mad River** (jump to tributaries)

=== Smith River ===
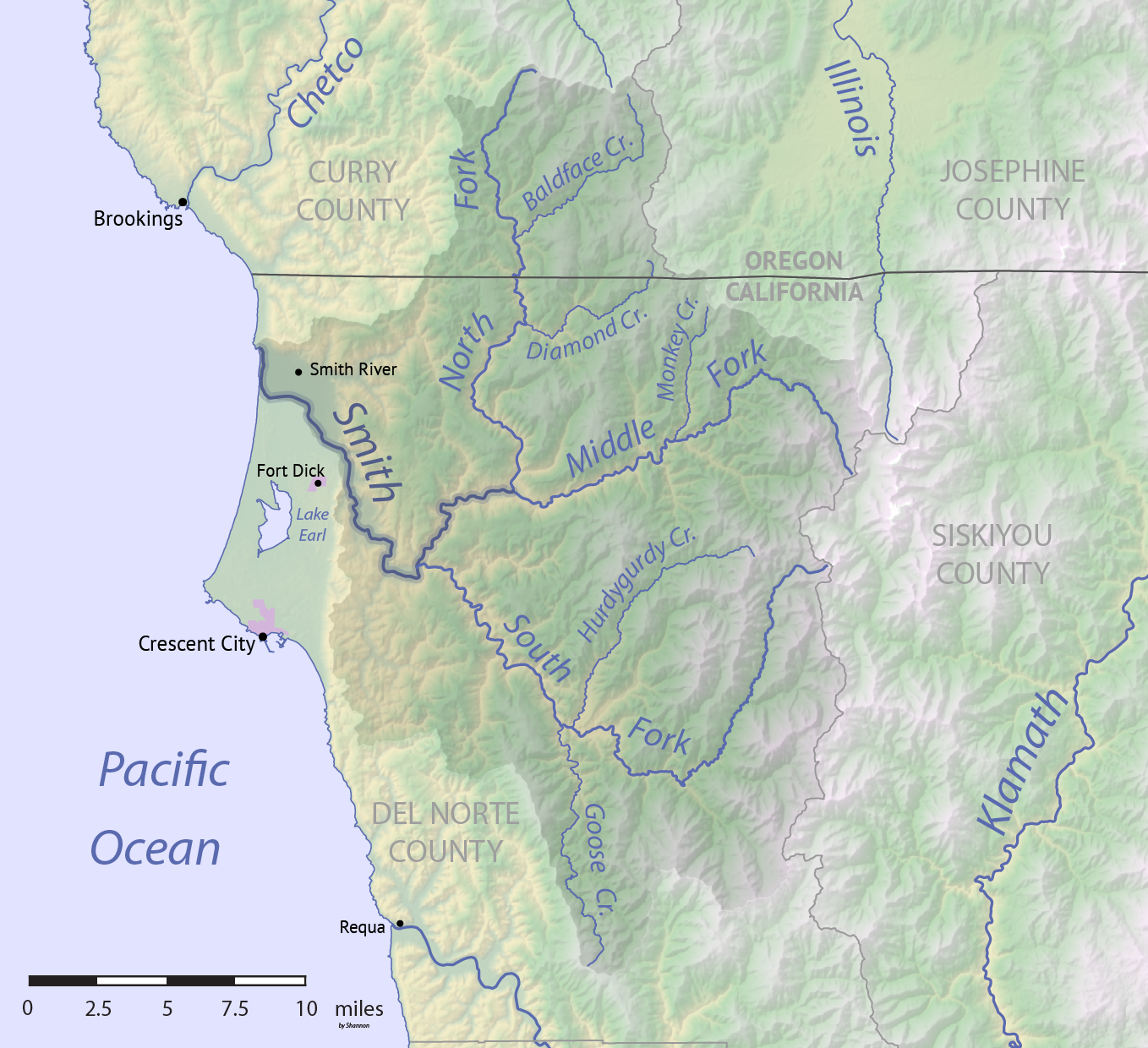
Smith River drainage basin

- Smith River
  - Rowdy Creek
  - Mill Creek
  - Myrtle Creek
  - South Fork Smith River
    - Craigs Creek
    - Coon Creek
    - Rock Creek
    - Gordon Creek
    - Goose Creek
    - Hurdygurdy Creek
    - Jones Creek
    - Buck Creek
    - Quartz Creek
    - Eightmile Creek
    - Harrington Creek
    - Prescott Fork Smith River
  - Middle Fork Smith River
    - Patrick Creek
    - Little Jones Creek
    - Monkey Creek
    - Siskiyou Fork Smith River
    - Griffin Creek
    - Knopki Creek
  - North Fork Smith River
    - Stony Creek
    - Still Creek
    - Diamond Creek

=== Klamath River ===
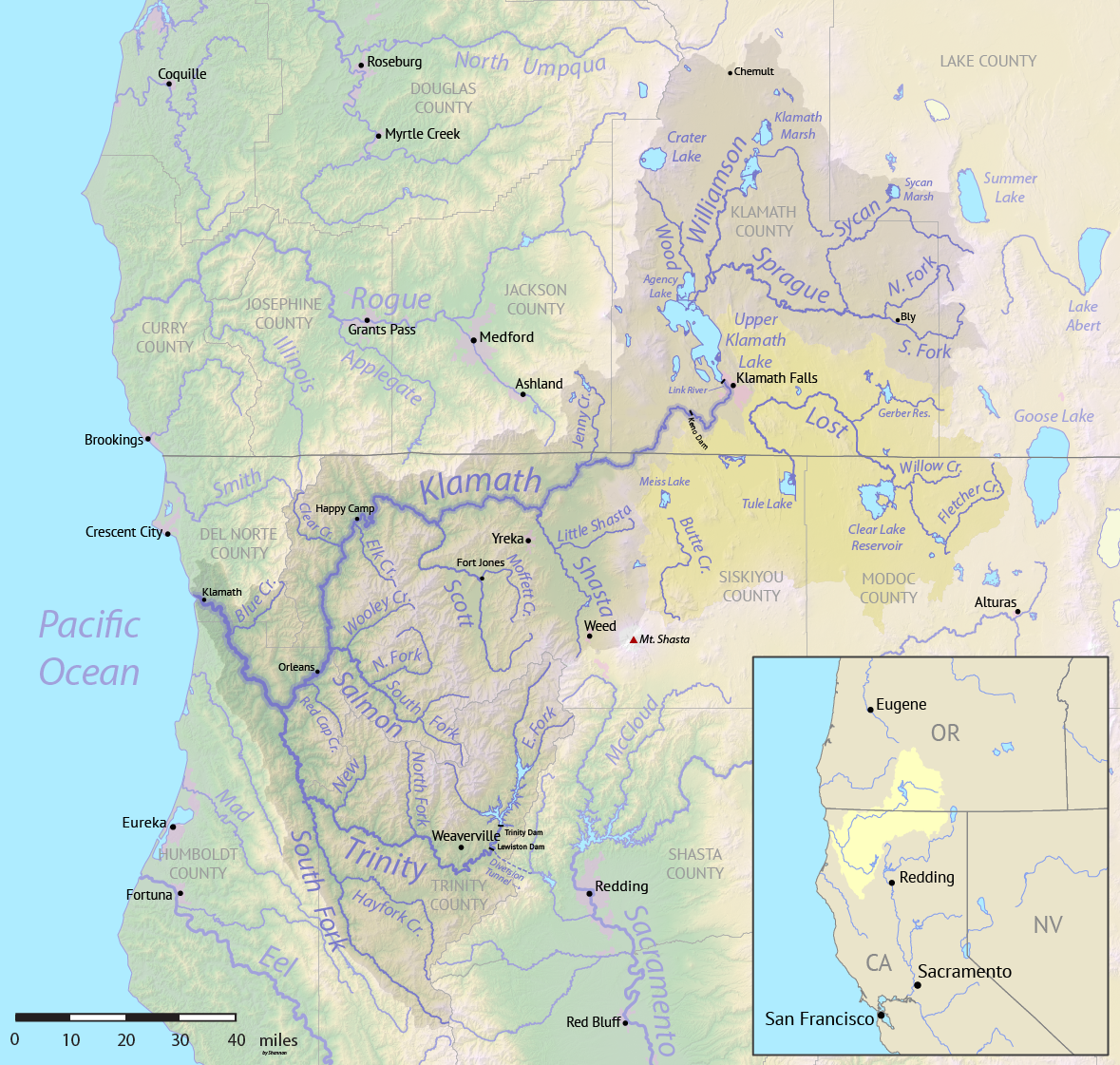
Klamath River drainage basin

- Klamath River
  - Hunter Creek
  - Turwar Creek
  - Blue Creek
    - West Fork Blue Creek
    - Nikowitz Creek
    - Crescent City Fork Blue Creek
    - East Fork Blue Creek
  - Ah Pah Creek
  - Tectah Creek
  - Pecwan Creek
  - Mettah Creek
  - Roach Creek
  - Tully Creek
  - Pine Creek
  - **Trinity River** (jump to tributaries)
  - Hopkins Creek
  - Indian Creek
  - Bluff Creek
    - Fish Creek
    - East Fork Bluff Creek
    - Notice Creek
    - North Fork Bluff Creek
  - Slate Creek
  - Red Cap Creek
    - North Fork Red Cap Creek
    - Middle Fork Red Cap Creek
  - Boise Creek
  - Camp Creek
  - Pearch Creek
  - **Salmon River** (jump to tributaries)
  - Rogers Creek
  - Irving Creek
  - Rock Creek
  - Swillup Creek
  - Ukonom Creek
    - McCash Fork
  - King Creek
  - Independence Creek
  - Clear Creek
    - South Fork Clear Creek
    - Fivemile Creek
    - Tenmile Creek
    - Bear Valley Creek
    - Red Hill Creek
    - West Fork Clear Creek
    - Doe Creek
  - Oak Flat Creek
  - Elk Creek
    - East Fork Elk Creek
    - Doolittle Creek
    - Bear Creek
    - Granite Creek
      - Burney Valley Creek
    - Toms Valley Creek
    - Rainy Valley Creek
  - Indian Creek
    - Doolittle Creek
    - East Fork Indian Creek
    - South Fork Indian Creek
      - Twin Valley Fork Indian Creek
    - Mill Creek
    - Granite Creek
    - Green Creek
  - China Creek
  - Thompson Creek
  - Fort Goff Creek
  - Portuguese Creek
  - Seiad Creek
  - Grider Creek
  - Walker Creek
  - Scott River
    - Mill Creek
    - Kelsey Creek
    - Shackleford Creek
    - Indian Creek
    - Moffett Creek
    - Kidder Creek
    - Etna Creek
      - Alder Creek
    - Sugar Creek
    - East Fork Scott River
    - South Fork Scott River
  - Shasta River
    - Yreka Creek
    - Oregon Slough
    - Little Shasta River
    - Willow Creek
    - Parks Creek
    - Whitney Creek
  - Cottonwood Creek
  - Bogus Creek
  - Jenny Creek
  - Butte Creek (joins the Klamath in Oregon)
  - Lost River (joins the Klamath in Oregon)
    - Rock Creek
    - Willow Creek
    - Mowitz Creek

==== Trinity River ====
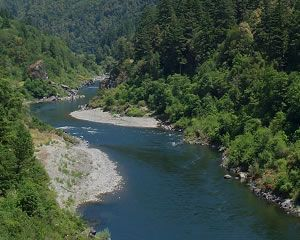
Trinity River

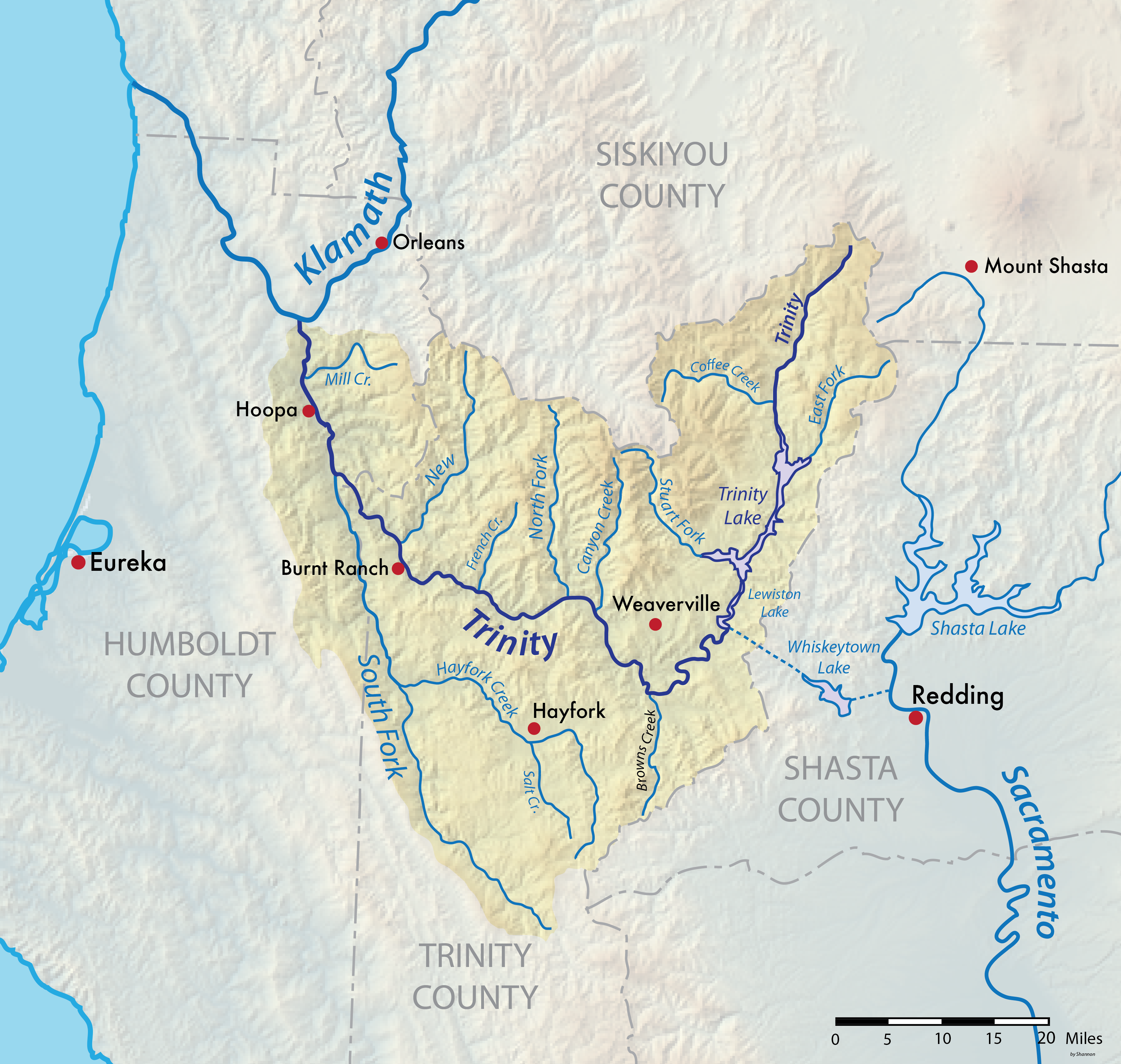
Trinity River drainage basin

- Trinity River
  - Mill Creek
  - Tish Tang o Tang Creek
  - Horse Linto Creek
  - Willow Creek
  - South Fork Trinity River
    - Madden Creek
    - Grouse Creek
      - Mosquito Creek
    - Buckeye Creek
    - Hayfork Creek
      - Corral Creek
      - Salt Creek
      - Big Creek
      - Carr Creek
      - East Fork Hayfork Creek
    - Indian Valley Creek
      - Butter Creek
    - Plummer Creek
    - Rattlesnake Creek
    - Smoky Creek
    - Happy Camp Creek
    - East Fork South Fork Trinity River
      - Prospect Creek
    - Shell Mountain Creek
  - Sharber Creek
  - Quinby Creek
  - Hawkins Creek
  - New River
    - Bell Creek
    - Big Creek
    - China Creek
    - Panther Creek
    - Quinby Creek
    - Devils Canyon Creek
    - East Fork New River
    - Slide Creek
    - Virgin Creek
  - Canadian Creek
  - Big French Creek
  - Little French Creek
  - Price Creek
  - Manzanita Creek
  - Big Bar Creek
  - Sailor Bar Creek
  - North Fork Trinity River
    - East Fork North Fork Trinity River
    - Backbone Creek
    - Whites Creek
    - China Creek
    - Rattlesnake Creek
    - Gas Creek
    - Grizzly Creek
  - Canyon Creek
    - Big East Fork Canyon Creek
    - Little East Fork Canyon Creek
  - Oregon Gulch
  - Soldier Creek
  - Dutch Creek
  - Browns Creek
    - Little Creek
  - Reading Creek
  - Weaver Creek
    - Little Browns Creek
    - East Weaver Creek
    - West Weaver Creek
  - Indian Creek
  - Grass Valley Creek
    - Little Grass Valley Creek
  - Rush Creek
  - Deadwood Creek
  - Papoose Creek
  - Stuart Fork
    - Hobel Creek
    - Mule Creek
    - Stoney Creek
    - Owens Creek
    - Deep Creek
    - Boulder Creek
    - Deer Creek
  - Swift Creek
    - Granite Creek
  - East Fork Trinity River
    - Cedar Creek
    - Mumbo Creek
    - Crow Creek
    - Baker Creek
  - Coffee Creek
    - Little Boulder Creek
    - Boulder Creek
    - Sugar Pine Creek
    - East Fork Coffee Creek
    - North Fork Coffee Creek
    - Union Creek
    - South Fork Coffee Creek
  - Scorpion Creek
  - Eagle Creek
  - Ramshorn Creek
  - Bear Creek
  - Tangle Blue Creek
  - Scott Mountain Creek
  - Little Trinity River
  - Sherer Creek
  - Picayune Creek
  - Cedar Creek
  - Bear Creek
  - High Camp Creek

==== Salmon River ====
- Salmon River
  - Merrill Creek
  - Somes Creek
  - Wooley Creek
    - Steinacher Creek
    - Bridge Creek
    - Rock Creek
    - Hancock Creek
    - North Fork Wooley Creek
      - Cuddihy Fork
    - Hell Hole Creek
    - Big Meadows Creek
    - South Fork Wooley Creek
    - Big Elk Fork
    - Bear Skull Creek
  - Butler Creek
  - Morehouse Creek
  - Nordheimer Creek
  - Crapo Creek
  - North Fork Salmon River
    - Little North Fork Salmon River
    - Russian Creek
    - Right Hand Fork North Fork Salmon River
  - South Fork Salmon River
    - Knownothing Creek
    - Methodist Creek
    - Black Bear Creek
    - Plummer Creek
    - St Claire Creek
    - Crawford Creek
    - Cecil Creek
    - East Fork South Fork Salmon River
      - Taylor Creek
    - Rush Creek
    - Little South Fork Salmon River

=== Redwood Creek ===
- Redwood Creek (Humboldt County)
  - Prairie Creek (California)
    - Lost Man Creek
  - McArthur Creek
  - Tom McDonald Creek
  - Bridge Creek
  - Copper Creek
  - Devils Creek
  - Coyote Creek
  - Panther Creek
  - Garrett Creek
  - Lacks Creek
  - Minor Creek
  - Lupton Creek
  - Noisy Creek
  - High Prairie Creek
  - Minon Creek
  - Lake Prairie Creek
  - Bradford Creek
  - Pardee Creek
  - Twin Lakes Creek

=== Mad River ===
- Mad River
  - Lindsay Creek
  - North Fork Mad River
  - Canon Creek
  - Maple Creek
  - Boulder Creek
  - Black Creek
  - Pilot Creek

== Humboldt Bay ==
Primary streams entering Humboldt Bay are listed north to south beginning north of the entrance to the bay and continuing in a clockwise direction. Tributaries entering nearest the bay are listed first.

For additional detail on Humboldt Bay streams, see Humboldt Bay: Bay tributaries and sloughs.

- Jacoby Creek
- Eureka Slough
  - Freshwater Slough
    - Freshwater Creek
- Elk River (California)
- Salmon Creek (Northern Humboldt County)

== North Coast (south of Humboldt Bay) ==
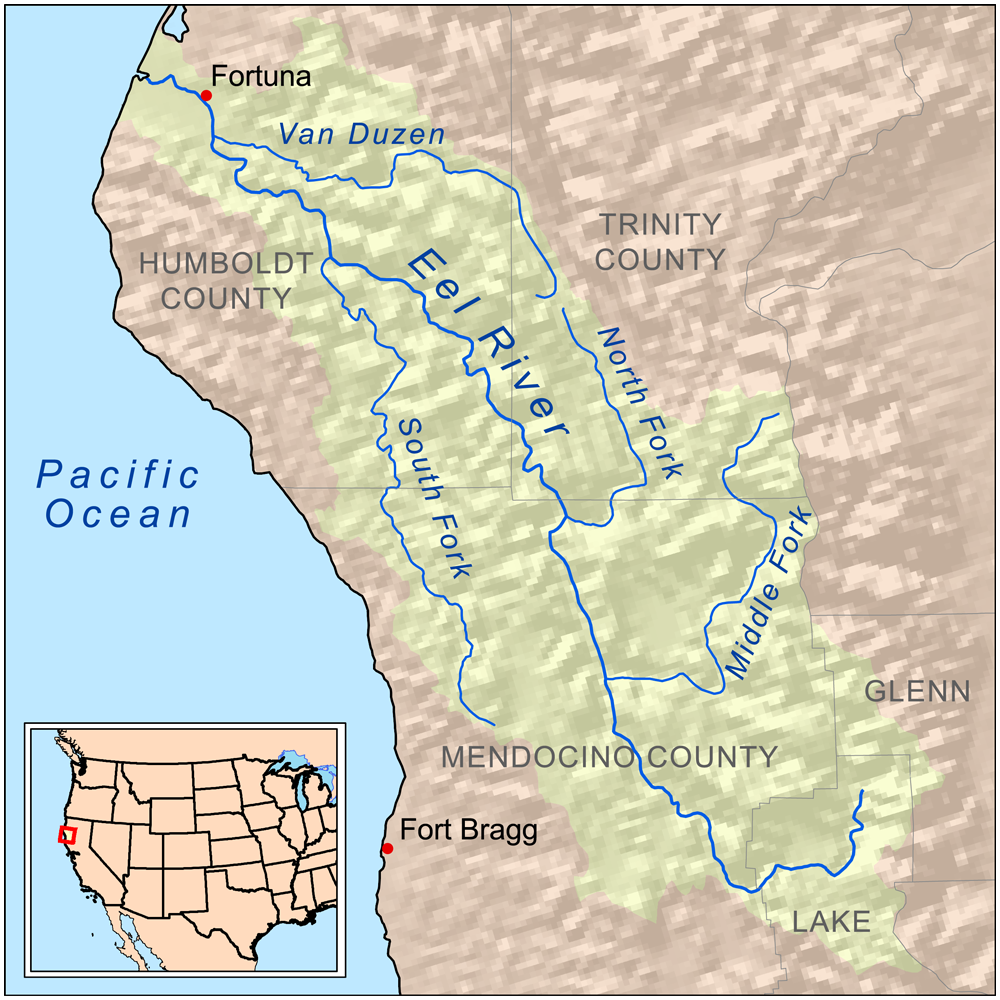
Eel River watershed map

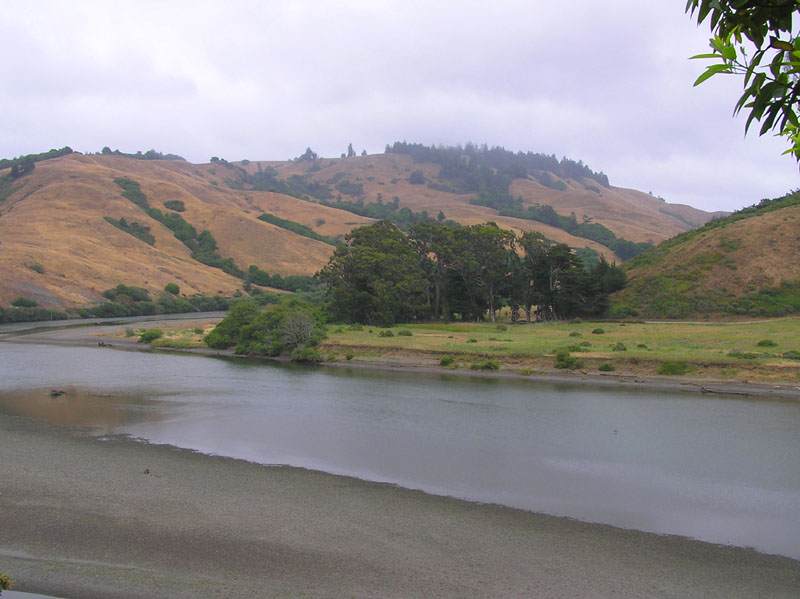
Russian River near Duncan's Mills

Rivers and streams between Humboldt Bay and the Golden Gate that empty into the Pacific Ocean (arranged north to south; tributaries with those entering nearest the sea first):

- Eel River
  - Salt River
  - Van Duzen River
    - Yager Creek
  - South Fork Eel River (see List of tributaries of the South Fork Eel River for additional detail)
    - Bull Creek
    - East Branch South Fork Eel River
    - Cedar Creek
    - Tenmile Creek
  - North Fork Eel River
  - Middle Fork Eel River
    - North Fork Middle Fork Eel River
    - Thatcher Creek
    - Black Butte River
    - Rice Fork
  - Outlet Creek
- Bear River
- Mattole River
  - North Fork Mattole River
  - Upper North Fork Mattole River
- Usal Creek
- Ten Mile River
- Noyo River
- Big River
- Little River
- Albion River
- Big Salmon Creek
  - Little Salmon Creek
- Navarro River
  - Rancheria Creek
  - Anderson Creek
- Garcia River
- Gualala River
  - Wheatfield Fork
- Russian River
  - East Fork Russian River
  - Ackerman Creek

For details of the Sonoma and Marin coasts, see List of watercourses in the San Francisco Bay Area.

== San Francisco Bay ==
Streams that empty into San Francisco Bay or its tributary bays (arranged clockwise, starting at the north side of the Golden Gate; tributaries are listed from those entering nearest the bays to farthest). The Central Valley watershed feeding into Suisun Bay via the Sacramento–San Joaquin Delta is excluded; see the following section for the Sacramento and San Joaquin river systems.

For additional detail on Bay Area creeks, see List of watercourses in the San Francisco Bay Area.

=== San Pablo Bay (north of Carquinez Strait) ===
- Corte Madera Creek
- Novato Creek
- Petaluma River
- Sonoma Creek
- Napa River
  - Carneros Creek

=== Suisun Bay ===
Clockwise

- Suisun Slough
  - Cordelia Slough
  - Suisun Creek
- Montezuma Slough
- Sacramento River (jump to tributaries)
- San Joaquin River (jump to tributaries)
- Kirker Creek
- Hastings Slough
  - Seal Creek
    - Mount Diablo Creek
- Pacheco Creek
- Alhambra Creek

=== San Pablo Bay (south of Carquinez Strait) and San Francisco Bay ===
- San Pablo Creek
- Pinole Creek
- San Leandro Creek
- San Lorenzo Creek
- Alameda Creek
- Coyote Creek
- Guadalupe River
- Stevens Creek
- San Francisquito Creek
- Redwood Creek (San Mateo County)
- San Mateo Creek

For additional detail on Bay Area creeks, see List of watercourses in the San Francisco Bay Area.

== Sacramento–San Joaquin River Delta ==
The Sacramento and San Joaquin River systems drain the western slope of the Sierra Nevada and most of the Central Valley, forming the Sacramento–San Joaquin River Delta before emptying into Suisun Bay; together, they are the largest river system in California.

=== Sacramento River ===
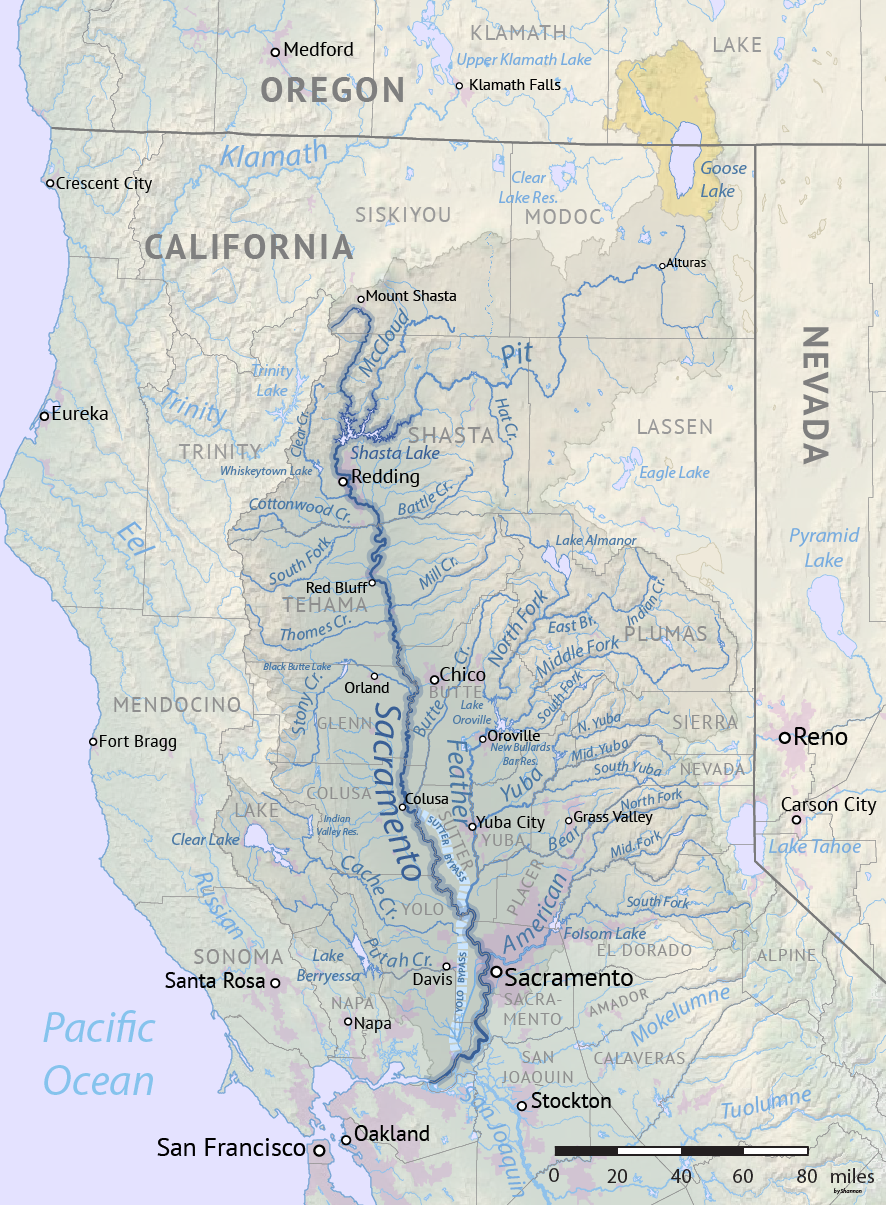
Map of Sacramento River

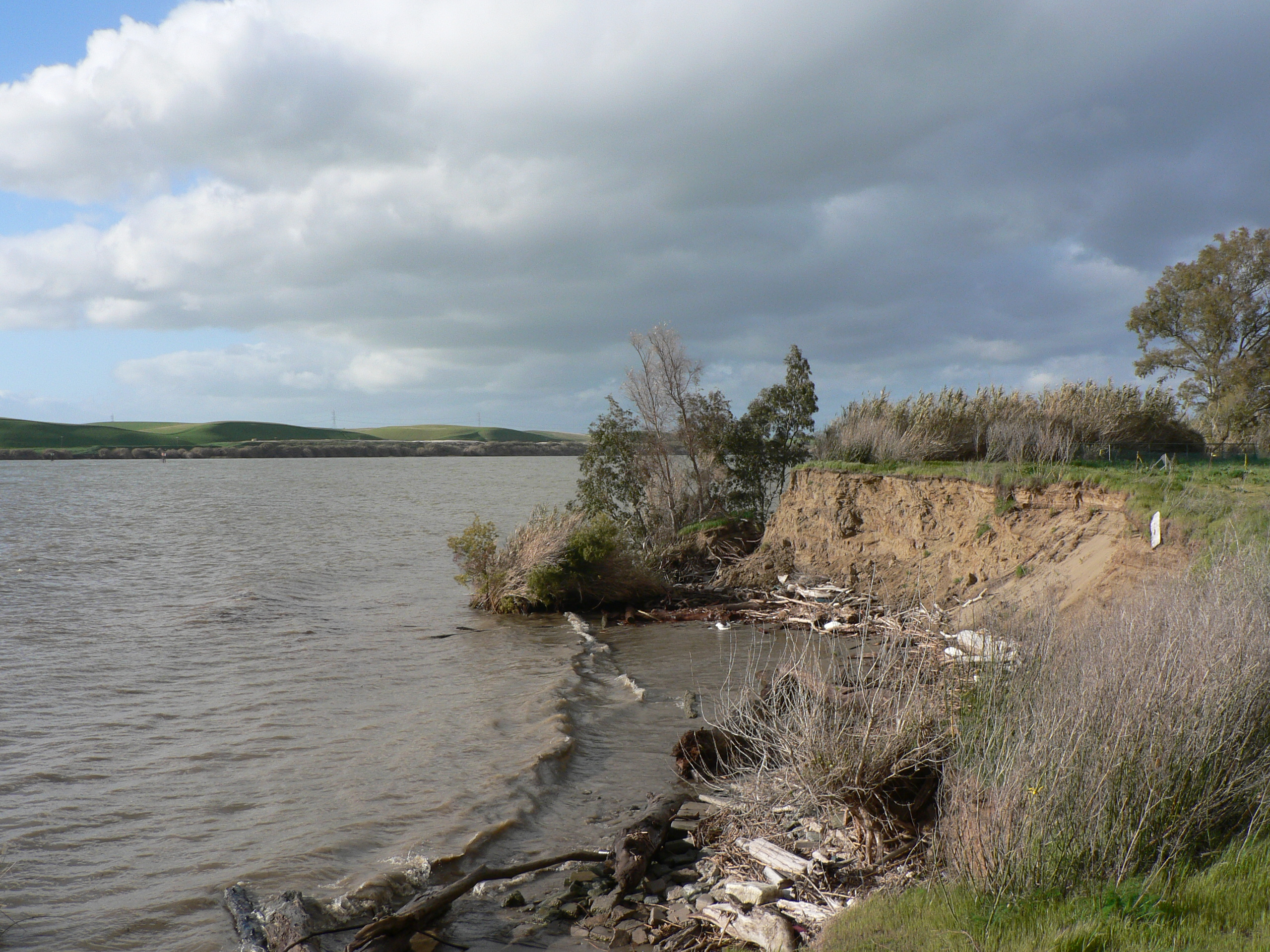
Sacramento River near the mouth

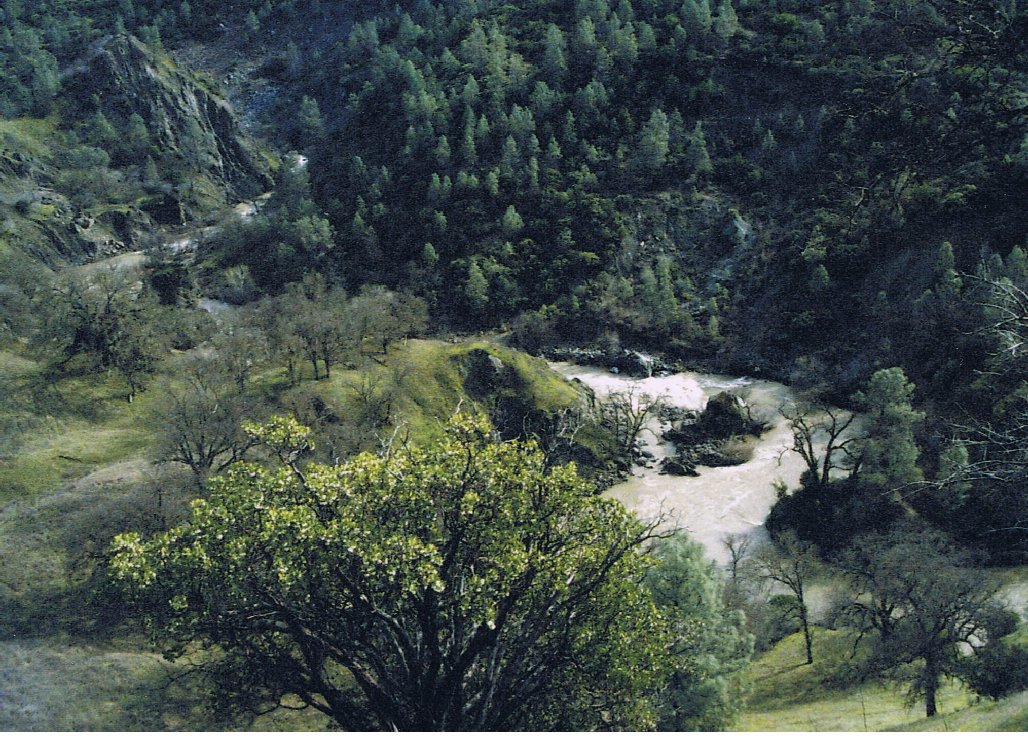
Cache Creek, in the Coast Ranges

- Sacramento River
  - Cache Slough
    - Steamboat Slough (splits from the Sacramento River upstream near Courtland)
    - Elkhorn Slough
    - Miner Slough
    - Sacramento Deep Water Ship Channel (splits from the Sacramento River upstream at the Port of Sacramento)
    - Prospect Slough
      - Dickson Creek
    - Lindsey Slough
    - Shag Slough
    - Yolo Bypass (jump to tributaries) – manmade floodway, occasionally receiving floodwaters from the Sacramento River via Fremont Weir near Knights Landing.
    - Alamo Creek
    - Ulatis Creek
  - American River (jump to tributaries)
  - Dry Creek
  - Feather River (jump to tributaries)
  - Colusa Basin Drainage Canal
    - Sand Creek
    - Cortina Creek
    - Salt Creek
    - Stone Corral Creek
    - Funks Creek
    - Hunter Creek
    - Willow Creek
  - Butte Creek
    - Angel Slough
      - Little Chico Creek
    - Little Dry Creek
    - Little Butte Creek
    - West Branch Butte Creek
  - Stony Creek
    - Black Butte Dam and Black Butte Lake
    - North Fork Stony Creek
    - Grindstone Creek
    - Elk Creek
    - Briscoe Creek
    - Little Stony Creek
    - North Fork Stony Creek
    - Middle Fork Stony Creek
    - South Fork Stony Creek
  - Big Chico Creek
    - Mud Creek
      - Rock Creek
  - Burch Creek
  - Jewett Creek
  - Deer Creek
  - Thomes Creek
    - Mill Creek
    - Fish Creek
  - Mill Creek
    - Little Mill Creek
  - Elder Creek
  - Willow Creek
    - Oat Creek
  - Dye Creek
  - Antelope Creek
    - Little Antelope Creek
  - Red Bank Creek
  - Reeds Creek
  - Dibble Creek
  - Payne's Creek
  - Battle Creek
    - North Fork Battle Creek
    - South Fork Battle Creek
  - Cottonwood Creek
    - Hooker Creek
    - South Fork Cottonwood Creek
      - Dry Creek
        - Salt Creek
      - Cold Fork Cottonwood Creek
      - Buck Creek
    - Dry Creek
    - North Fork Cottonwood Creek
      - Roaring River
        - Wilson Creek
      - Jerusalem Creek
      - Moon Fork Cottonwood Creek
    - Middle Fork Cottonwood Creek
      - Beegum Creek
        - South Fork Beegum Creek
  - Ash Creek
  - Bear Creek
  - Cow Creek
    - Little Cow Creek
      - Swede Creek
      - Dry Creek
      - Cedar Creek
    - Oak Run Creek
    - Clover Creek
    - Old Cow Creek
      - Glendenning Creek
    - South Cow Creek
  - Clear Creek
    - South Fork Clear Creek
    - Whiskeytown Dam, Whiskeytown Lake
    - Crystal Creek
    - East Fork Clear Creek
  - Rock Creek
  - Keswick Dam, Keswick Reservoir
  - Spring Creek
    - Spring Creek
    - Slickrock Creek
    - Boulder Creek
  - Flat Creek
  - Shasta Dam, Shasta Lake
  - Backbone Creek
  - Pit River (jump to tributaries)
  - Salt Creek
  - Castle Creek
  - Soda Creek
  - North Fork Sacramento River
  - Middle Fork Sacramento River
  - South Fork Sacramento River

==== Yolo Bypass ====
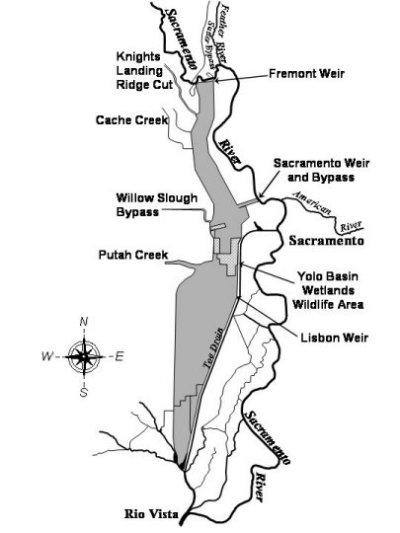
Yolo Bypass location

- Yolo Bypass
  - Putah Creek
    - Big Canyon Creek
    - Pleasant Creek
    - Monticello Dam, Lake Berryessa
    - Capell Creek
    - Pope Creek
    - Eticuera Creek
    - Hunting Creek
    - St Helena Creek
  - Willow Slough
  - Cache Creek
    - Bear Creek
      - Sulphur Creek
    - Rocky Creek
    - North Fork of Cache Creek
      - Long Valley Creek
      - Wolf Creek
      - Indian Valley Dam, Indian Valley Reservoir
      - Bartlett Creek
    - Clear Lake (inflow streams listed clockwise starting at outlet)
      - Kelsey Creek
      - Adobe Creek
      - Forbes Creek
      - Rodman Slough
        - Scotts Creek
        - Middle Creek
          - Clover Creek

==== American River ====
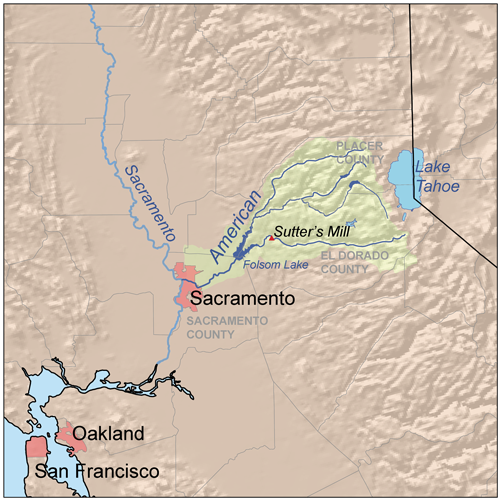
American River drainage basin

- American River
  - Folsom Dam, Folsom Lake
  - North Fork American River
    - Middle Fork American River
      - Canyon Creek
      - Otter Creek
      - North Fork of the Middle Fork American River
        - El Dorado Canyon
        - Peavine Creek
        - Grouse Creek
        - Secret Canyon
      - Rubicon River
        - Long Canyon
        - Pilot Creek
        - South Fork Rubicon River
          - Gerle Creek
        - Hell Hole Dam, Hell Hole Reservoir
        - Five Lakes Creek
      - Duncan Canyon
      - French Meadows Dam, French Meadows Reservoir
    - Clipper Creek
    - Owl Creek
    - Bunch Canyon
    - Shirttail Canyon
    - Indian Creek
    - Canyon Creek
    - North Fork of North Fork American River
      - East Fork of North Fork of North Fork American River
    - Big Granite Creek
  - South Fork American River
    - Weber Creek
    - Greenwood Creek
    - Dutch Creek
    - Rock Creek
    - Slab Creek
    - Silver Creek
      - South Fork Silver Creek
      - Little Silver Creek
      - Union Valley Dam, Union Valley Reservoir
      - Jones Fork
      - Bassi Fork
    - Alder Creek
    - Silver Fork American River
      - Caples Creek
    - Pyramid Creek

==== Feather River ====
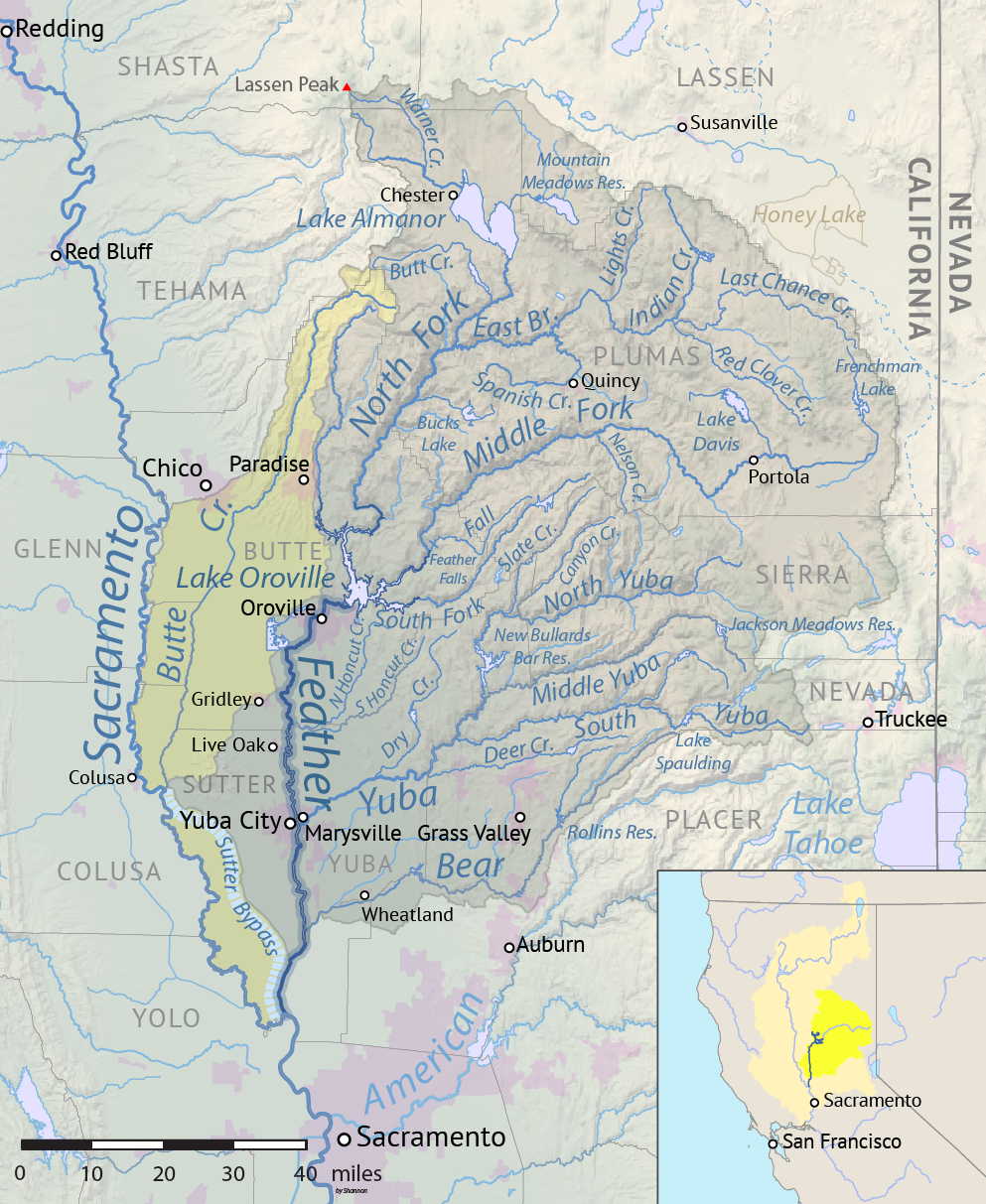
Feather River drainage basin

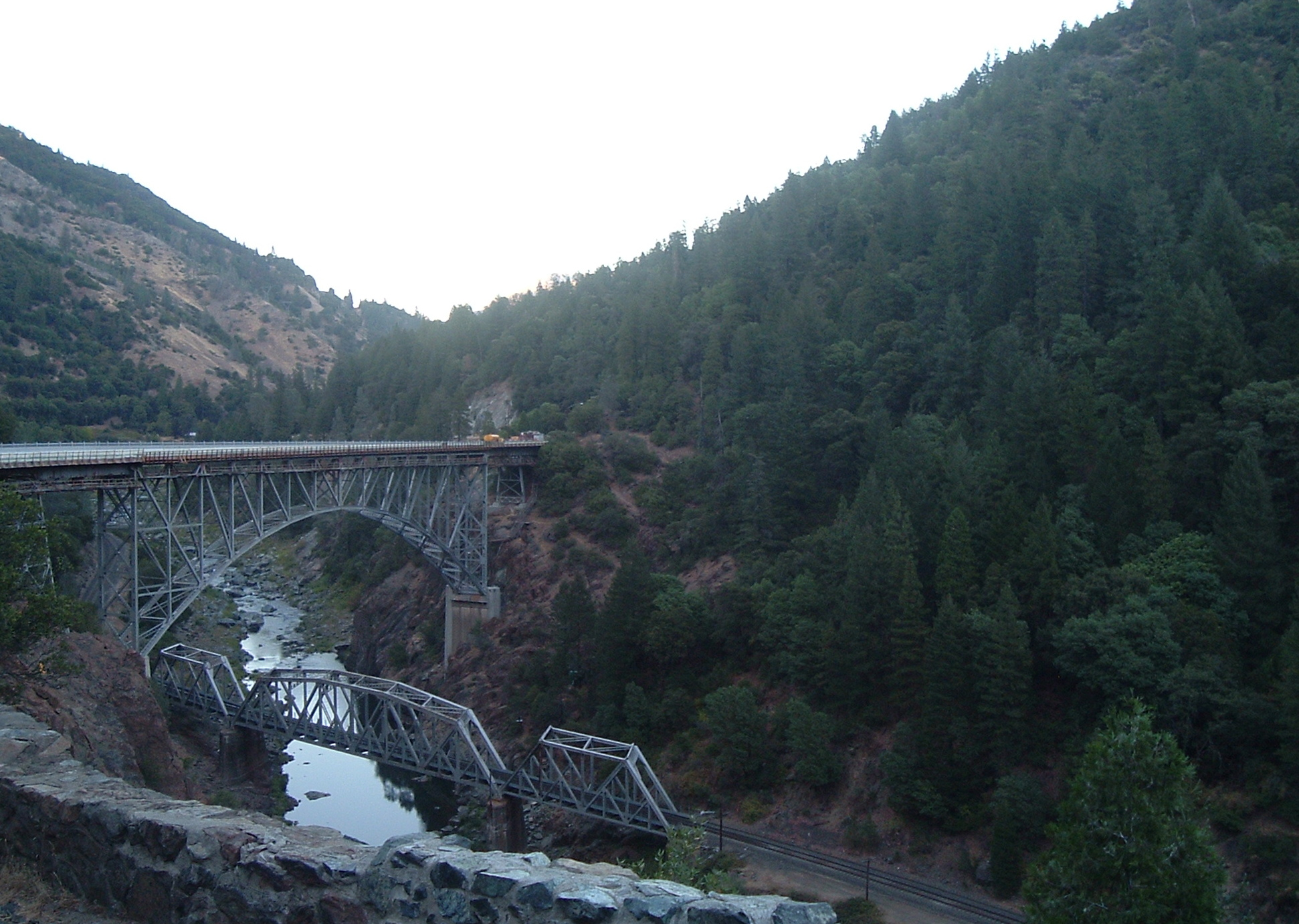
Headwaters of the Feather River

- Feather River
  - Sutter Bypass - manmade floodway, occasionally receives floodwaters from the Sacramento River upstream and Butte Creek
  - Bear River
    - Algodon Slough
      - Best Slough
      - Hutchinson Creek
      - Feeds Creek
    - Dry Creek
    - Camp Far West Dam, Camp Far West Reservoir
    - Rock Creek
    - Wolf Creek
    - Rollins Dam, Rollins Reservoir
    - Greenhorn Creek
    - Steephollow Creek
  - Yuba River (jump to tributaries)
  - Honcut Creek
    - North Honcut Creek
    - South Honcut Creek
  - Oroville Dam and Lake Oroville
  - North Fork Feather River
    - Canyon Creek
    - West Branch Feather River
      - Concow Creek
      - Little West Fork Feather River
      - Big Kimshew Creek
      - Last Chance Creek
    - French Creek
    - Grizzly Creek
    - Bucks Creek
    - Chips Creek
    - Yellow Creek
    - East Branch North Fork Feather River
      - Rush Creek
      - Indian Creek
        - Wolf Creek
        - Lights Creek
        - Little Grizzly Creek
        - Last Chance Creek
          - Red Clover Creek
            - Dixie Creek
          - Squaw Queen Creek
        - Boulder Creek
      - Spanish Creek
        - Greenhorn Creek
        - Rock Creek
  - Middle Fork Feather River
    - South Fork Feather River
      - Sucker Run
      - Lost Creek
      - Little Grass Valley Dam, Little Grass Valley Reservoir
    - Fall River
    - Little North Fork Feather River
    - South Branch Middle Fork Feather River
    - Willow Creek
    - Bear Creek
    - Onion Valley Creek
    - Nelson Creek
    - Jamison Creek
    - Grizzly Creek
    - Sierra Valley Channels
      - Smithneck Creek
      - Little Last Chance Creek

===== Yuba River =====
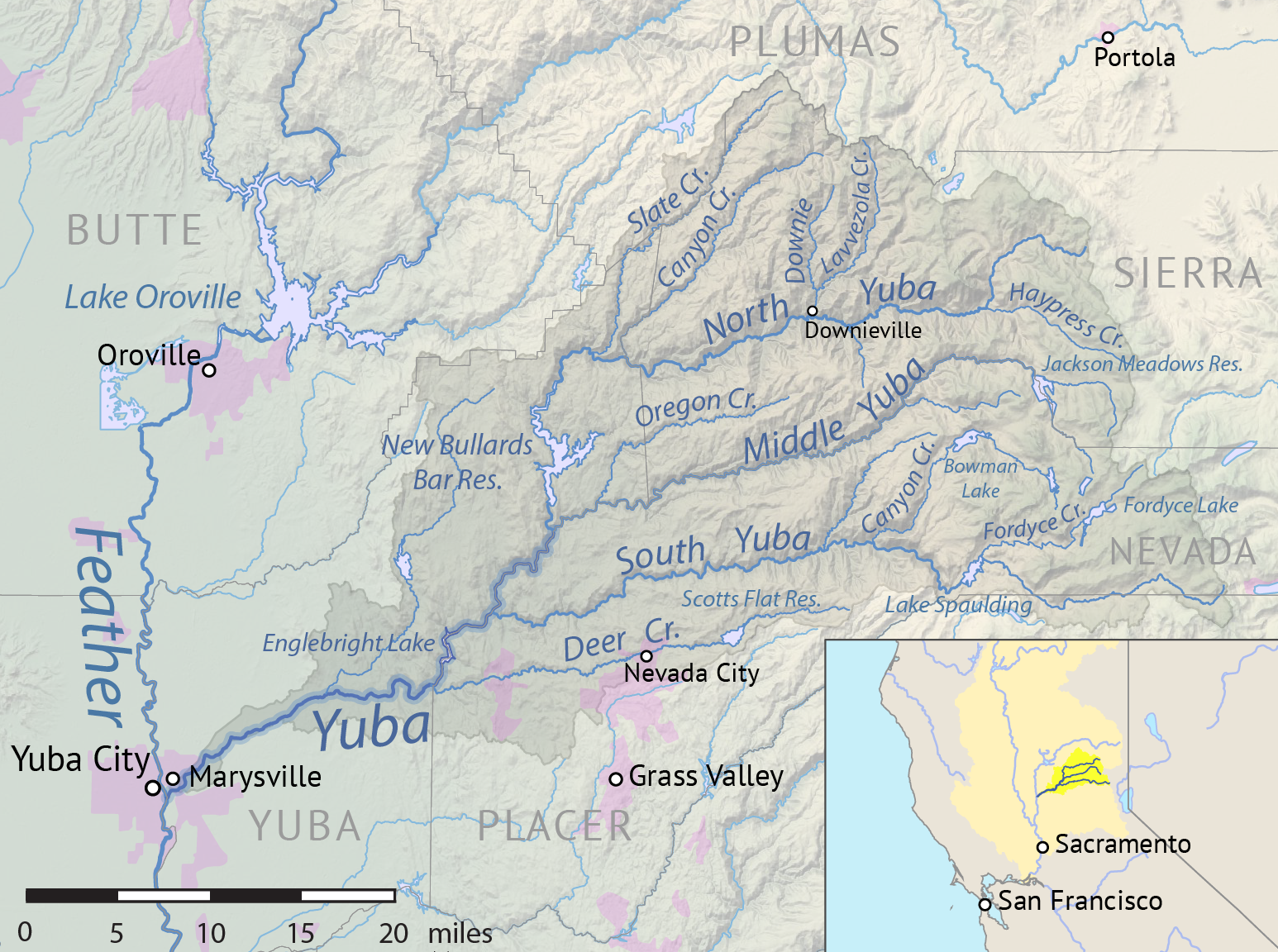
Yuba River drainage basin

- Yuba River
  - Dry Creek
  - Deer Creek
    - Squirrel Creek
  - Englebright Dam, Englebright Lake
  - South Yuba River
    - Rush Creek
    - Rock Creek
    - Spring Creek
    - Humbug Creek
    - Poorman Creek
    - Canyon Creek
    - Lake Spaulding Dam, Lake Spaulding
    - Fordyce Creek
      - North Creek
    - Rattlesnake Creek
    - Castle Creek
  - Middle Yuba River
    - Oregon Creek
    - Kanaka Creek
    - Wolf Creek
    - East Fork Creek
    - Jackson Meadows Dam, Jackson Meadows Reservoir
  - North Yuba River
    - New Bullards Bar Dam, New Bullards Bar Reservoir
    - Slate Creek
    - Canyon Creek
      - Little Canyon Creek
    - Goodyears Creek
    - Downie River
      - Pauley Creek
        - Lavezzola Creek
    - Haypress Creek
    - Salmon Creek

==== Pit River ====
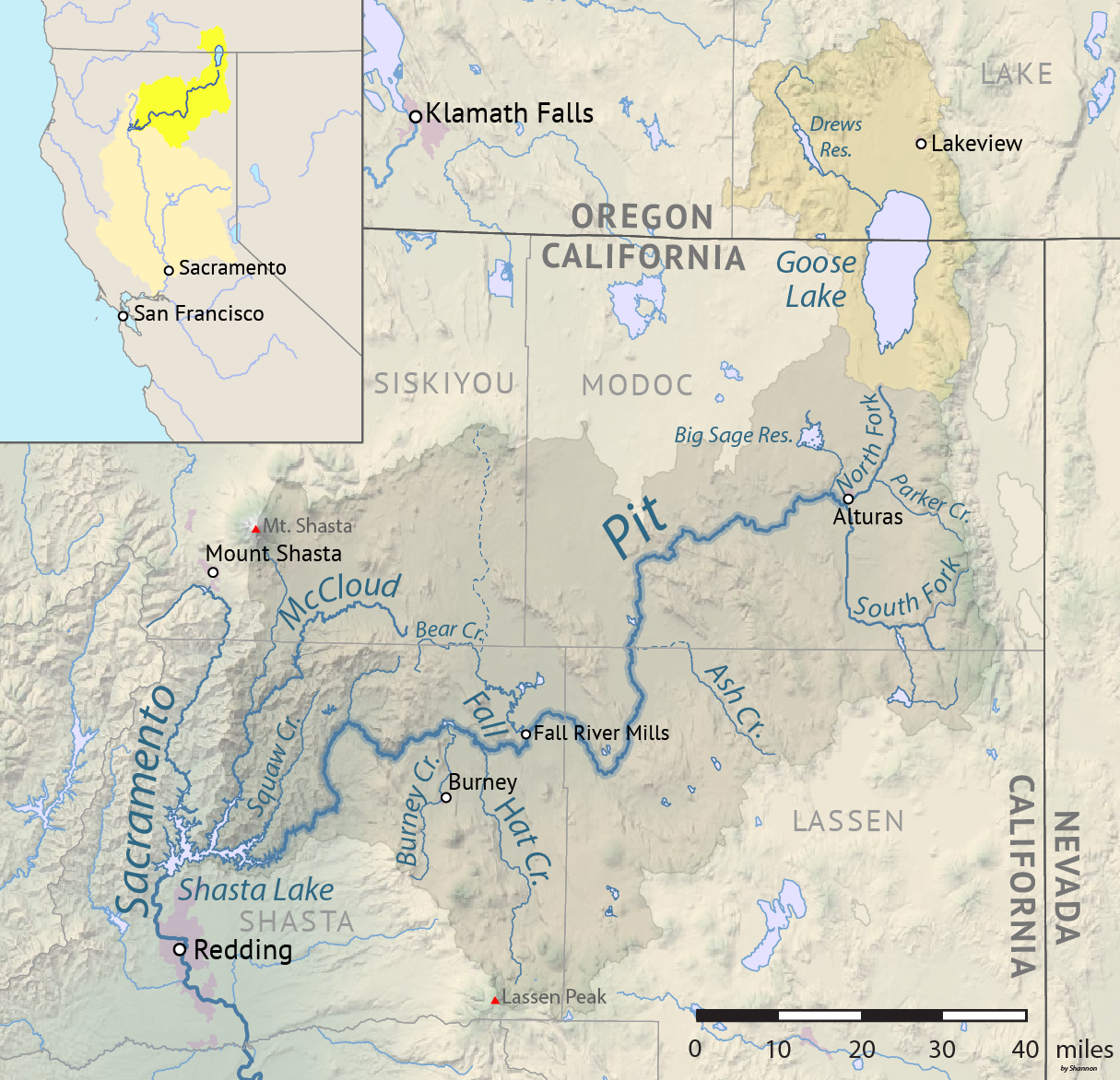
Pit River drainage basin

- Pit River
  - McCloud River
    - Nosoni Creek
    - Chatterdown Creek
    - Squaw Valley Creek
    - Claiborne Creek
    - Hawkins Creek
    - Star City Creek
    - Angel Creek
    - Mud Creek
    - Ash Creek
      - Edson Creek
  - Squaw Creek
    - Salt Creek
    - North Fork Squaw Creek
  - Potem Creek
  - Roaring Creek
  - Iron Canyon Creek
  - Kosk Creek
  - Nelson Creek
  - Rock Creek
  - Clark Creek
  - Burney Creek
  - Hat Creek
    - Rising River
    - Lost Creek
  - Fall River
    - Tule River
      - Little Tule River
    - Bear Creek
  - Beaver Creek
  - Horse Creek
  - Ash Creek
    - Willow Creek
    - Dutch Flat Creek
  - Taylor Creek
  - Turner Creek
  - Toms Creek
  - Clover Swale Creek
  - Canyon Creek
  - Rattlesnake Creek
  - North Fork Pit River
    - Pine Creek
    - Parker Creek
    - Thoms Creek
    - Joseph Creek
    - Goose Lake (historical)
  - South Fork Pit River
    - Fitzhugh Creek
    - Dry Creek
    - Cedar Creek
    - Mill Creek
    - East Creek

=== San Joaquin River ===
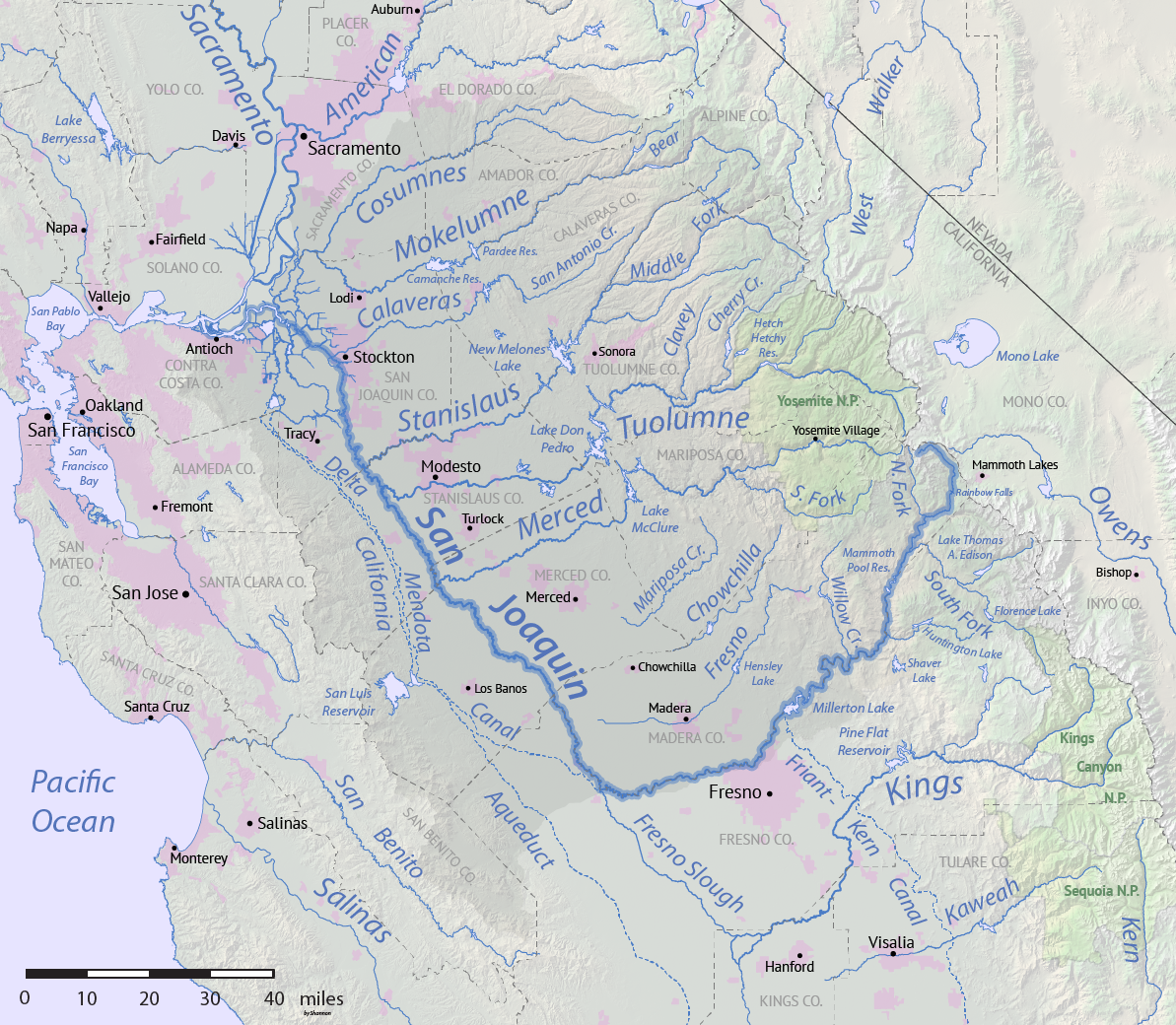
San Joaquin River map

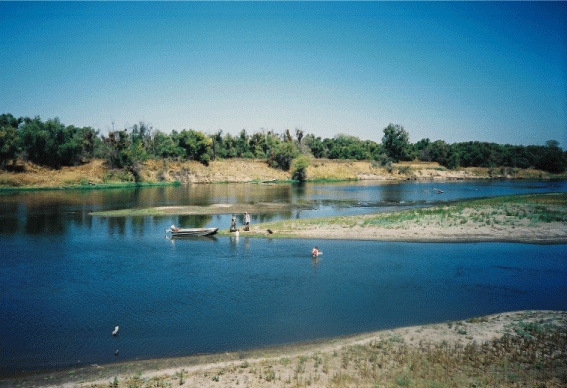
The San Joaquin River

- San Joaquin River
  - Marsh Creek
  - Mokelumne River (jump to tributaries)
  - Old River (side channel of San Joaquin River)
  - Middle River (side channel of San Joaquin River)
  - Bear Creek
  - Calaveras River (jump to tributaries)
  - Mormon Slough (distributary of Calaveras River)
  - French Camp Slough
    - Littlejohns Creek
      - Rock Creek
    - Lone Tree Creek
  - Corral Hollow Creek (historical)
  - Stanislaus River (jump to tributaries)
  - Hospital Creek
  - Ingram Creek
  - Tuolumne River (jump to tributaries)
  - Del Puerto Creek
  - Salado Creek
  - Orestimba Creek
    - Crow Creek
  - Merced River (jump to tributaries)
  - Mud Slough
    - Los Banos Creek
      - Garzas Creek
      - San Luis Creek
  - Bear Creek
    - Deep Slough
      - Owens Creek
      - Mariposa Creek
        - Deadman Creek
  - Mariposa Slough
  - Eastside Bypass (man-made floodway, occasionally receiving floodwater from the upstream San Joaquin River via Chowchilla Bypass Structure, near Mendota)
    - Chowchilla River
    - Fresno River
      - Dry Creek
  - Fresno Slough (also carries floodwaters diverted from the Kings River via North Fork distributary)
  - Friant Dam, Millerton Lake
  - Fine Gold Creek
  - Willow Creek
  - Stevenson Creek
    - Shaver Lake
  - Big Creek
    - Huntington Lake
  - Rock Creek
  - Chiquito Creek
    - Beasore Creek
  - Mammoth Pool Dam, Mammoth Pool Reservoir
  - Kaiser Creek
  - Jackass Creek
  - South Fork San Joaquin River
    - Mono Creek
      - Vermilion Valley Dam, Lake Thomas A. Edison
    - Bear Creek
    - Florence Lake Dam, Florence Lake
    - Piute Creek
    - Evolution Creek
  - Granite Creek
  - North Fork San Joaquin River
  - Middle Fork San Joaquin River
    - Fish Creek
    - Minaret Creek
    - Thousand Island Lake (San Joaquin River source)

==== Mokelumne River ====
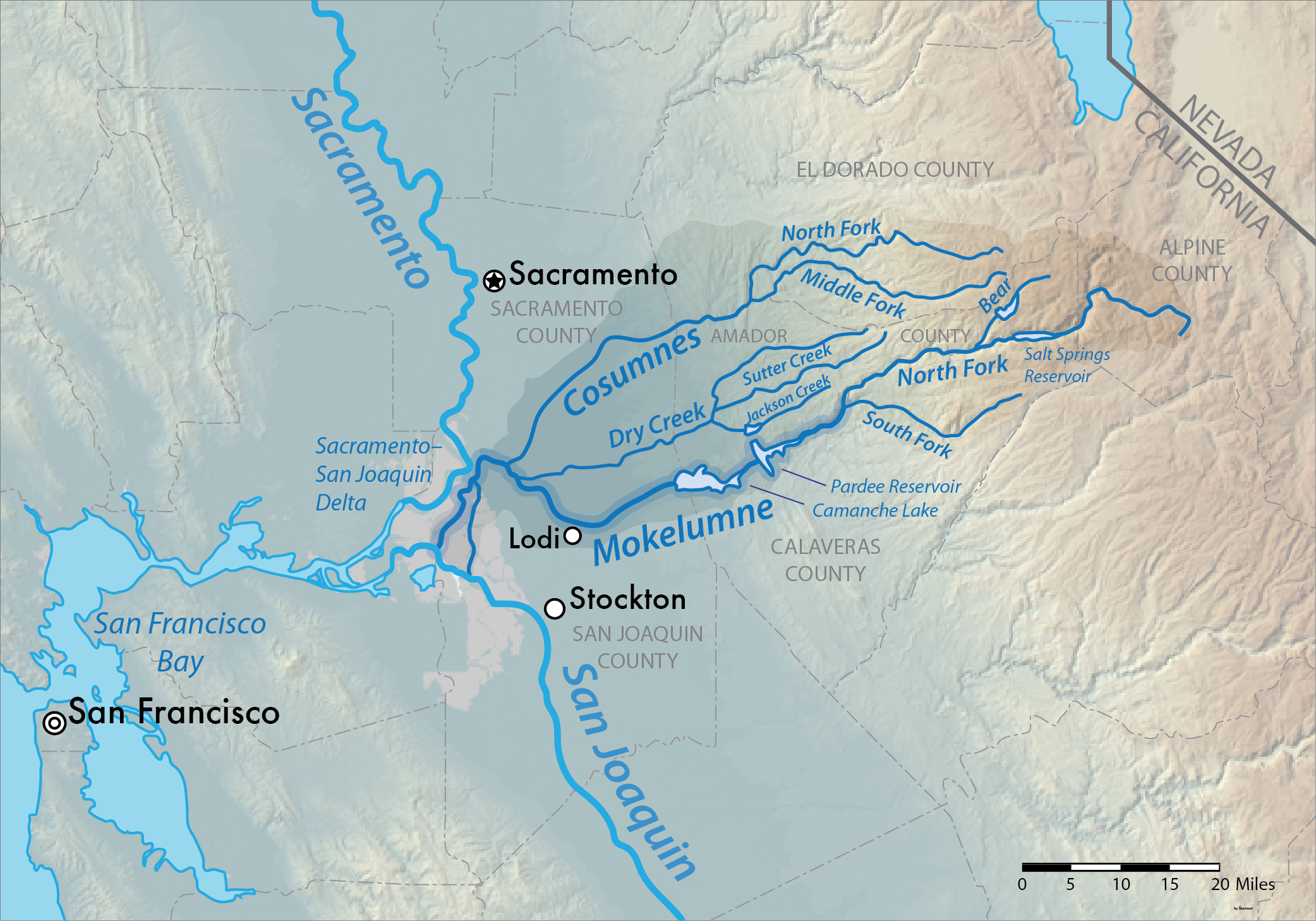
Mokelumne River drainage basin

- Mokelumne River
  - Snodgrass Slough
  - Cosumnes River
    - Skunk Creek
    - Badger Creek
    - Deer Creek
    - Arkansas Creek
    - Little Indian Creek
    - Big Canyon Creek
    - Big Indian Creek
    - North Fork Cosumnes River
      - Camp Creek
        - Sly Park Creek
      - Steely Fork Cosumnes River
    - Middle Fork Cosumnes River
      - Scott Creek
      - Dogtown Creek
  - Dry Creek
    - Coyote Creek
    - Jackson Creek
    - Sutter Creek
    - Rancheria Creek
    - North Fork Dry Creek
    - South Fork Dry Creek
  - Camanche Dam, Camanche Lake
  - Pardee Dam, Pardee Reservoir
  - North Fork Mokelumne River
    - Tiger Creek
    - Blue Creek
    - Bear River
    - Salt Springs Dam, Salt Springs Reservoir
    - Summit City Creek
    - Pacific Creek
  - Middle Fork Mokelumne River
    - South Fork Mokelumne River
      - Licking Fork
    - Forest Creek

Note: In the Delta the Mokelumne River divides into two short branches, also called the "North Fork" and "South Fork", which recombine before reaching the San Joaquin River.

==== Calaveras River ====
- Calaveras River
  - New Hogan Dam, New Hogan Lake
  - North Fork Calaveras River
    - Murray Creek
    - Jesus Maria Creek
    - Esperanza Creek
  - South Fork Calaveras River
    - Calaveritas Creek
    - San Antonio Creek
    - San Domingo Creek
    - Cherokee Creek

==== Stanislaus River ====
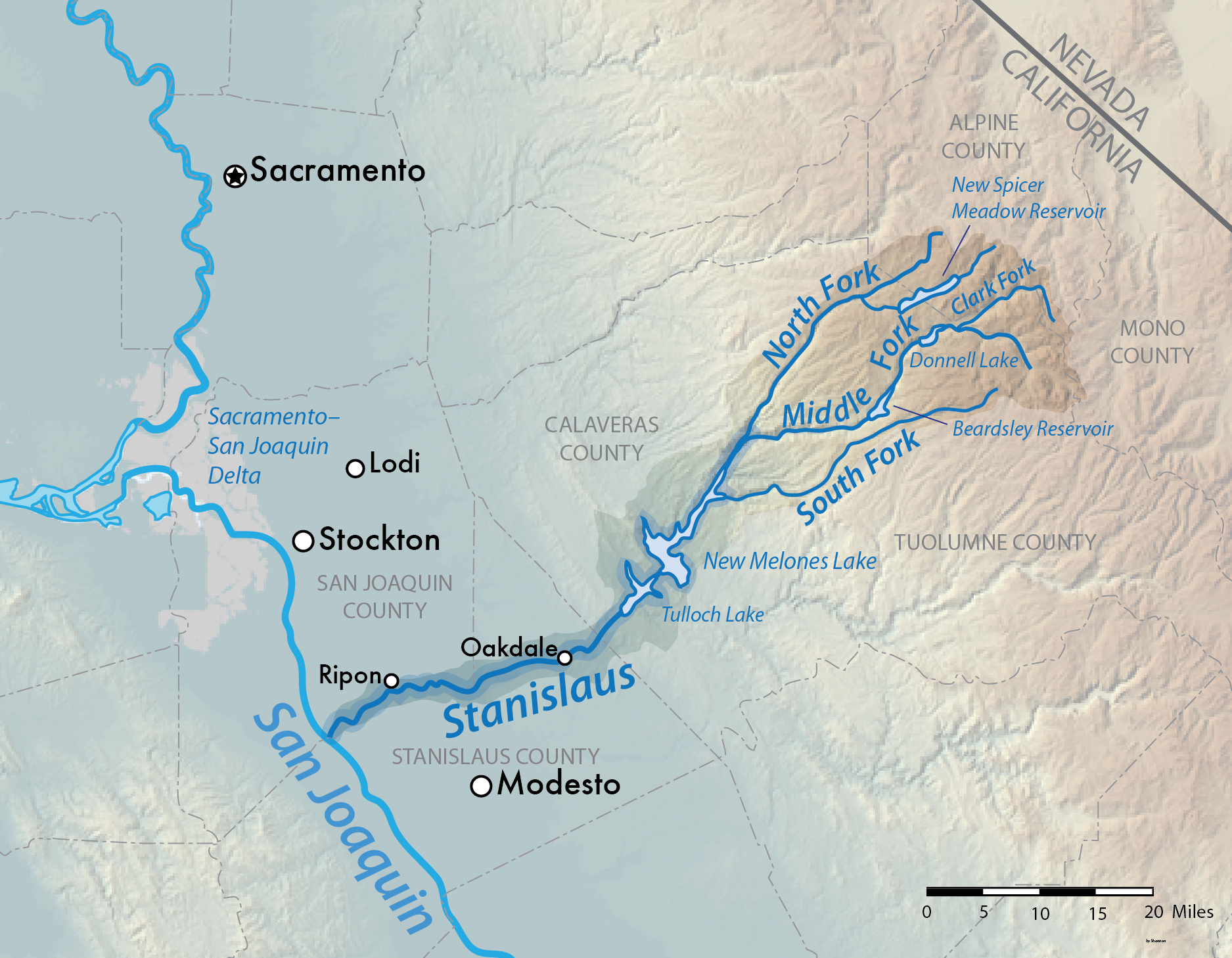
Stanislaus River drainage basin

- Stanislaus River
  - Tulloch Dam, Tulloch Reservoir
  - Black Creek
  - New Melones Dam, New Melones Lake
  - Mormon Creek
  - Angels Creek
  - Coyote Creek
  - South Fork Stanislaus River
    - Deer Creek
    - Herring Creek
  - Rose Creek
    - Knight Creek
    - Eagle Creek
  - Middle Fork Stanislaus River
    - Beardsley Dam, Beardsley Lake
    - Mill Creek
    - Donnells Dam, Donnell Lake
    - Niagara Creek
    - Dardanelles Creek
    - Clark Fork Middle Fork Stanislaus River
      - Arnot Creek
      - Disaster Creek
    - Eagle Creek
    - Deadman Creek
    - Summit Creek
    - Kennedy Creek
  - North Fork Stanislaus River
    - Griswold Creek
      - Soap Creek
      - Skull Creek
    - Mill Creek
    - Beaver Creek
    - Highland Creek
      - New Spicer Meadow Dam, New Spicer Meadow Reservoir
    - Bloods Creek
    - Silver Creek

==== Tuolumne River ====
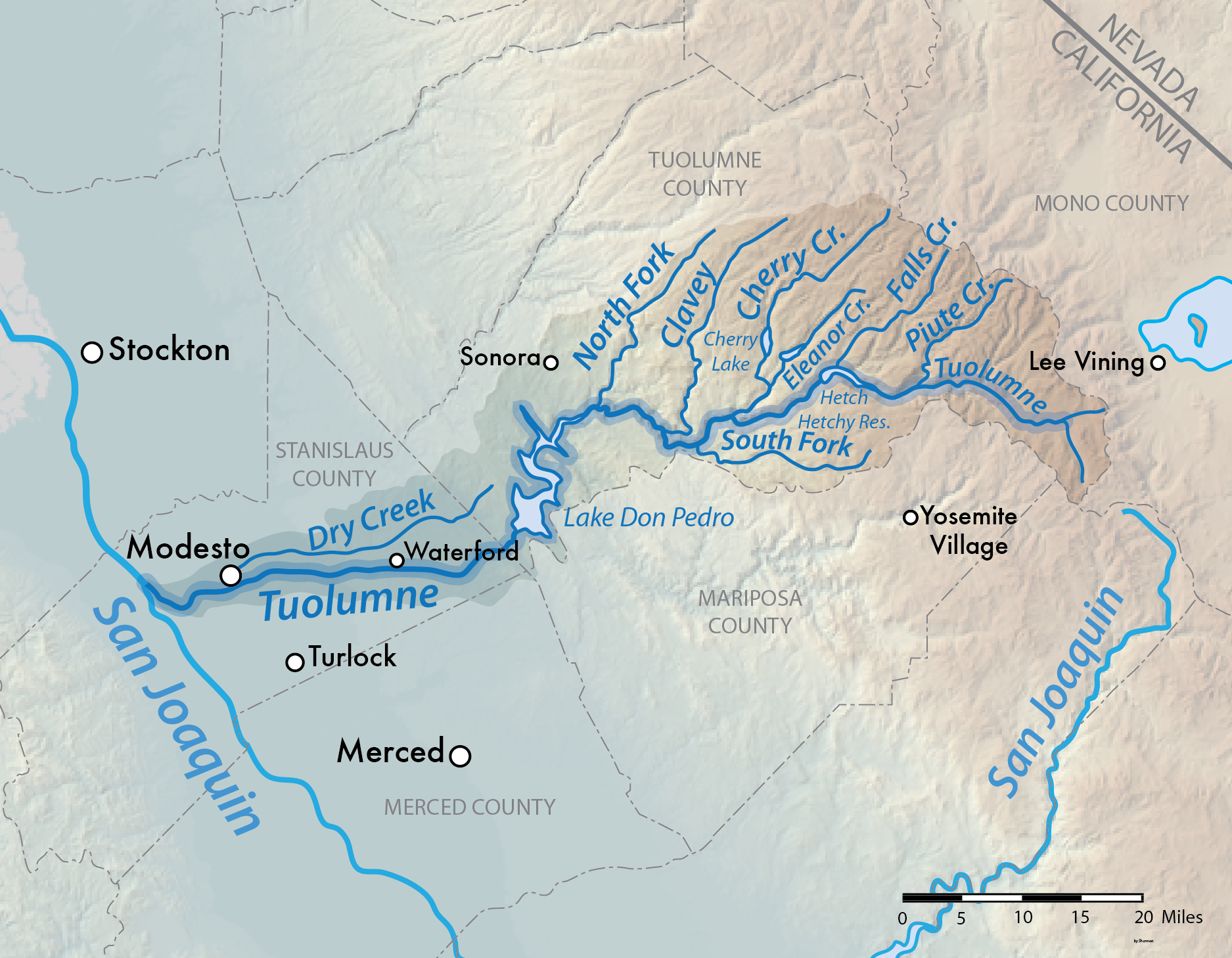
Tuolumne River drainage basin

- Tuolumne River
  - Dry Creek
  - New Don Pedro Dam, Lake Don Pedro
  - Moccasin Creek
  - Sullivan Creek
    - Woods Creek
  - North Fork Tuolumne River
  - Clavey River
    - Hull Creek
    - Reynolds Creek
    - Bourland Creek
    - Bell Creek
    - Lily Creek
  - South Fork Tuolumne River
    - Middle Fork Tuolumne River
      - Cottonwood Creek
  - Cherry Creek
    - Eleanor Creek
      - Frog Creek
      - Kendrick Creek
    - Cherry Valley Dam, Cherry Lake
    - West Fork Cherry Creek
    - East Fork Cherry Creek
    - North Fork Cherry Creek
  - O'Shaughnessy Dam, Hetch Hetchy Reservoir
  - Falls Creek
    - Tilden Creek
  - Tiltill Creek
  - Rancheria Creek
    - Breeze Creek
    - Stubblefield Canyon
  - Piute Creek
  - Register Creek
  - Ten Lakes Basin Creek
  - Cathedral Creek
    - South Fork Cathedral Creek
  - Return Creek
    - Matterhorn Canyon
  - Conness Creek
    - Alkali Creek
  - Dingley Creek
  - Delaney Creek
  - Budd Creek
  - Unicorn Creek
  - Dana Fork Tuolumne River
    - Gaylor Creek
    - Parker Pass Creek
      - Mono Pass Creek
  - Lyell Fork Tuolumne River
    - Rafferty Creek
      - Evelyn Lake Creek
    - Ireland Creek
    - Kuna Creek

==== Merced River ====
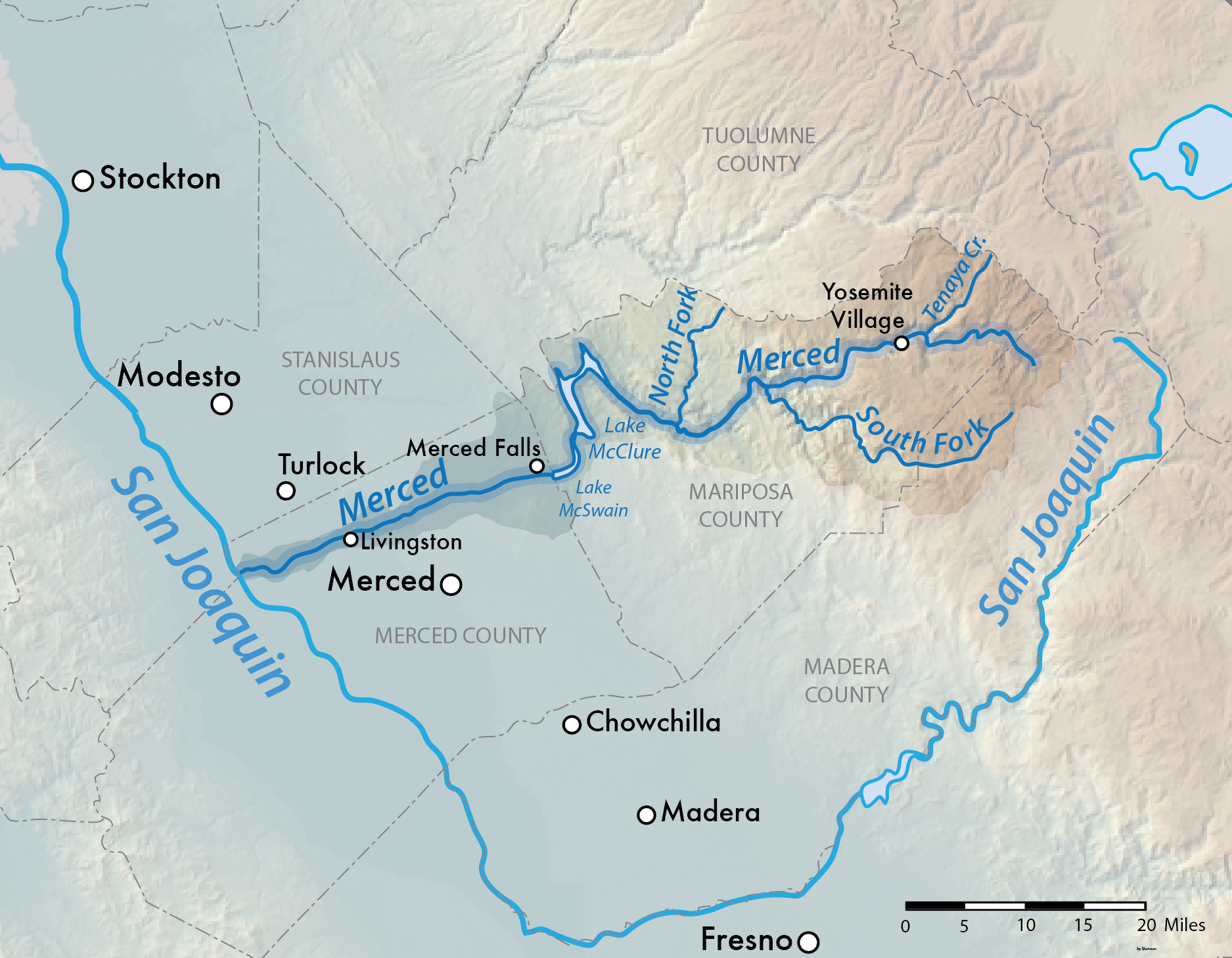
Merced River drainage basin

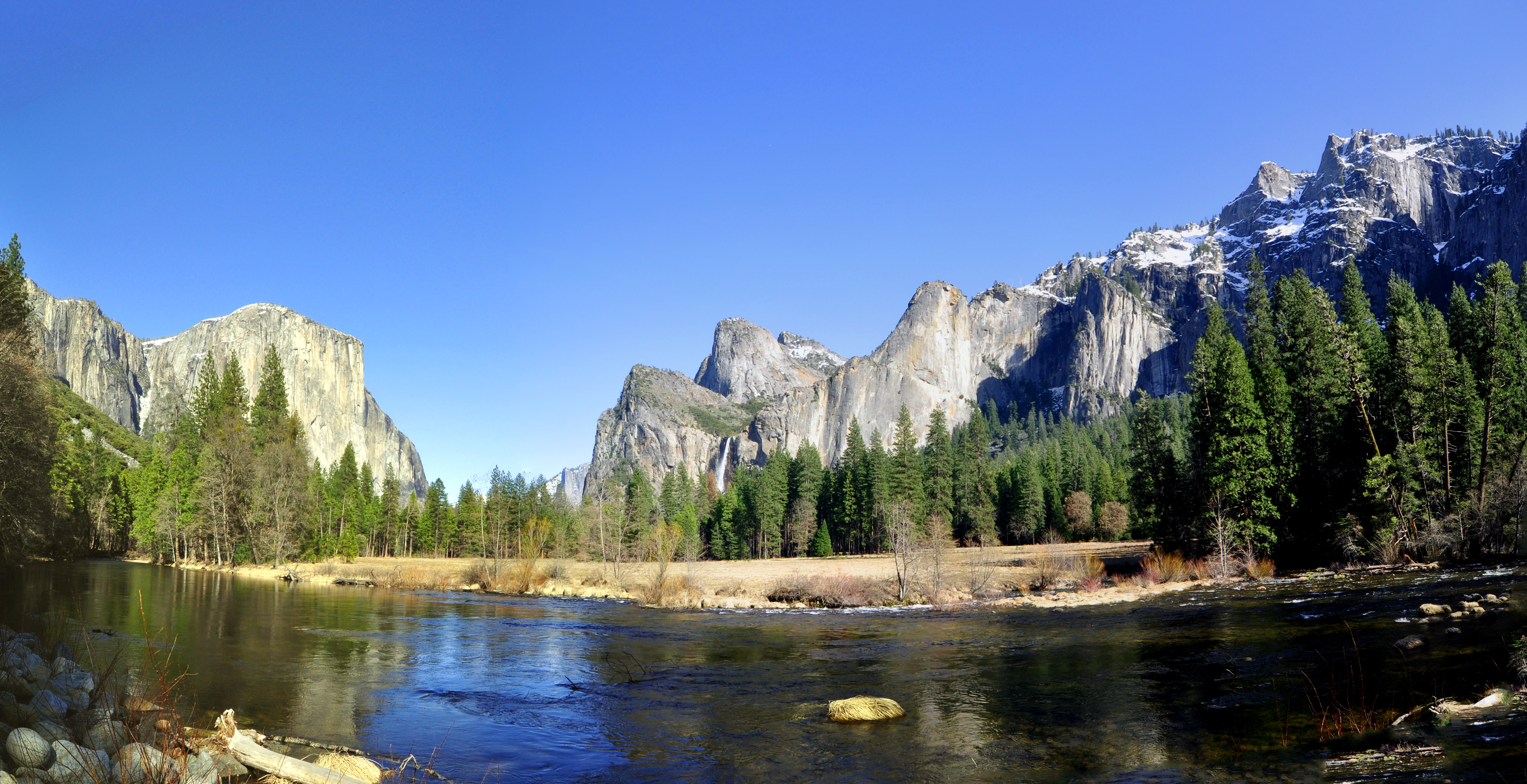
The Merced River in Yosemite Valley

- Merced River
  - Bear Creek
  - Dry Creek
  - New Exchequer Dam and Lake McClure
  - North Fork Merced River
  - South Fork Merced River
    - Alder Creek
    - Bishop Creek
      - Elevenmile Creek
        - Rail Creek
  - Bridalveil Creek
  - Yosemite Creek
  - Tenaya Creek
    - Snow Creek
  - Illilouette Creek
  - Fletcher Creek
    - Lewis Creek
      - Florence Creek
  - Red Peak Fork
    - Red Devil Creek
  - Lyell Fork
    - Hutching Creek
  - Merced Peak Fork
  - Triple Peak Fork
    - Foerster Creek

=== Tulare Basin ===
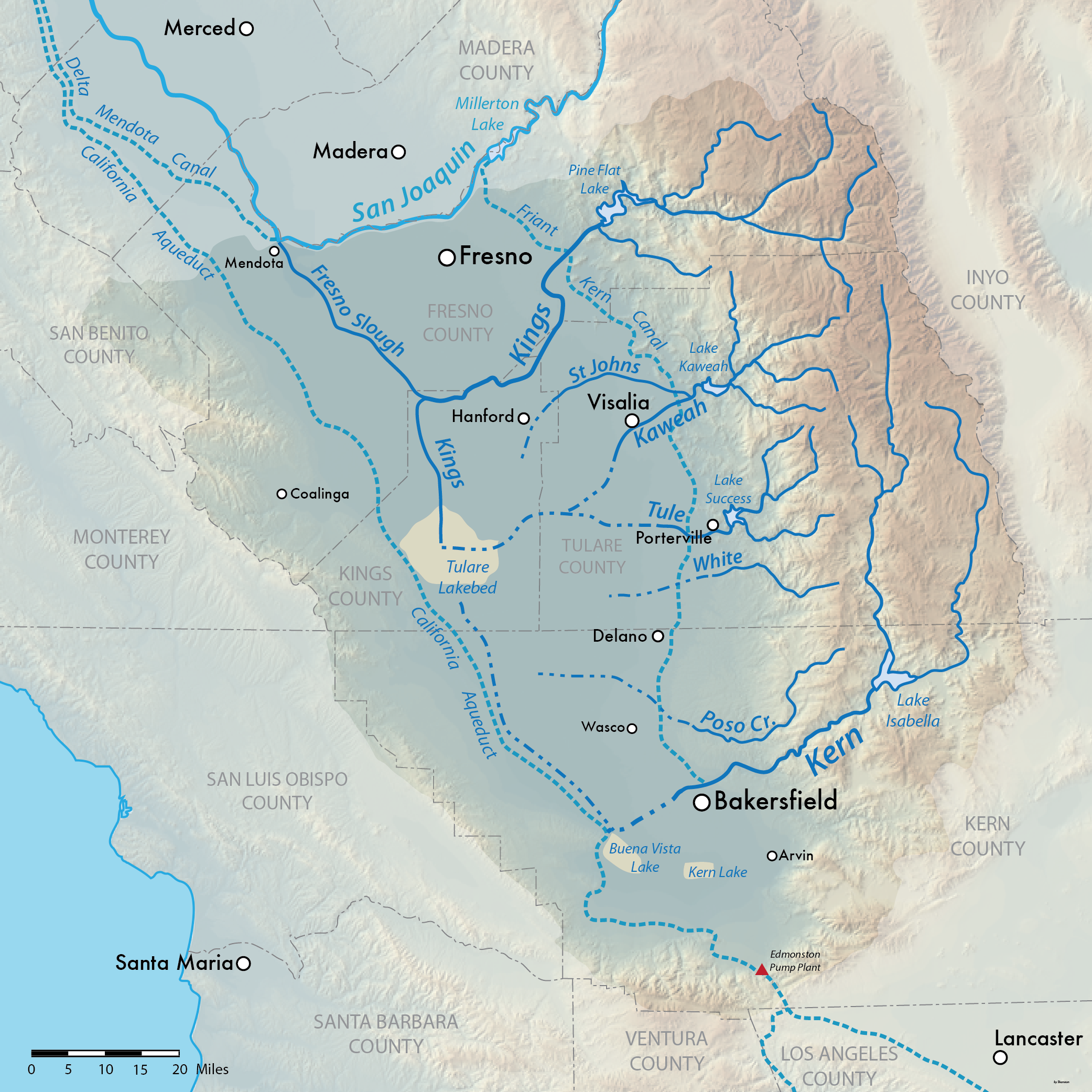
Map of the Tulare Lake Basin

Usually an endorheic basin, waters in this region all eventually would reach Tulare Lake. This region would overflow into the San Joaquin River during flood years when Tulare Lake overflowed. Streams are listed clockwise around the Tulare Basin, starting at the Kings River:

- Kings River (jump to tributaries)
- Sand Creek
- Cross Creek
  - Mill Creek
    - Kaweah River (jump to tributaries)
  - Elbow Creek
    - St. John's River (distributary of Kaweah River)
  - Cottonwood Creek
- Lewis Creek
- Tule River (jump to tributaries)
- Deer Creek
  - Pothole Creek
  - Gordon Creek
  - Tyler Creek
- White River
  - Coarse Gold Creek
  - Arrastre Creek
  - Chalaney Creek
- Rag Gulch
  - Five Dog Creek
  - Willow Springs Creek
- Deer Creek
- Poso Creek
  - Little Creek
  - Rattlesnake Creek
  - Little Poso Creek
  - Cedar Creek
    - Lumreau Creek
  - Von Hellum Creek
  - Spear Creek
- Kern River (jump to tributaries)
- Caliente Creek
  - Walker Basin Creek
    - Rancheria Creek
  - Tehachapi Creek
  - Indian Creek
- Tejon Creek
- El Paso Creek
- Pastoria Creek
- Grapevine Creek
- Tecuya Creek
- Salt Creek
- Pleito Creek
- San Emigdio Creek
- Los Lobos Creek
- Santiago Creek
- Bitter Creek
- Bitterwater Creek
- Sandy Creek
- Buena Vista Creek
- Salt Creek
- Chico Creek
- Santos Creek
- Media Agua Creek
- Bitterwater Creek
- Avenal Creek
- Baby King Creek
- Canoas Creek
- Los Gatos Creek
  - Zapato Chino Creek

==== Kings River ====
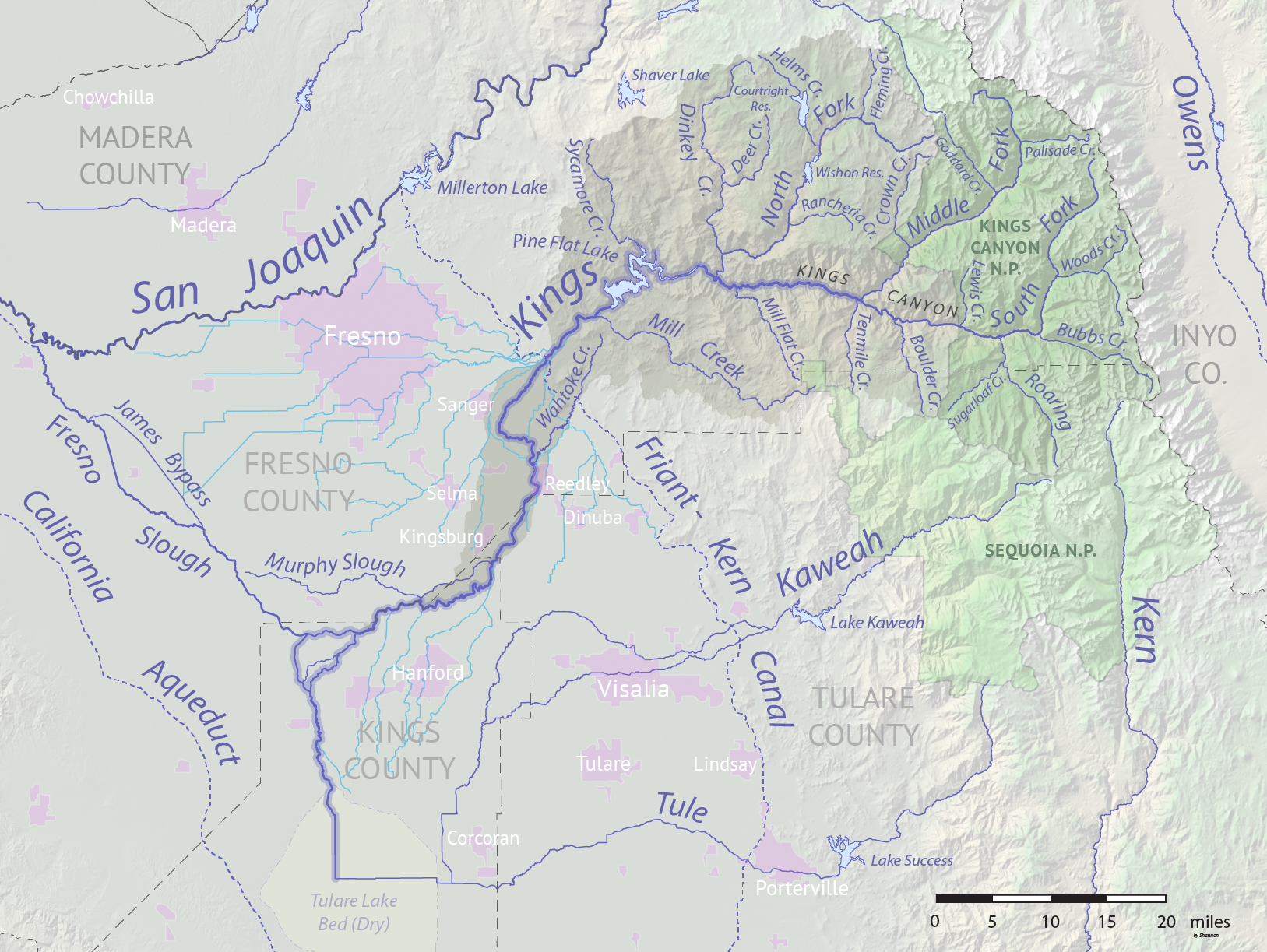
Kings River drainage basin

- Kings River (Divides into the North Fork, South Fork and Clark's Fork distributaries in the San Joaquin Valley, not to be confused with the North and South Forks in the Sierra Nevada headwaters. North Fork connects to the Fresno Slough that drains into the San Joaquin River (during high flows), before turning to the south rejoining with the other distributaries to reform the Kings River and emptying into Tulare Lake.)
  - Fish Creek
  - Hughes Creek
  - Mill Creek
  - Pine Flat Dam, Pine Flat Lake
  - Deer Creek
  - Zebe Creek
  - Russian Charlie Creek
  - Lefever Creek
  - Billy Creek
  - Sycamore Creek
  - Big Creek
  - Sacata Creek
  - Redoak Creek
  - Lower Rancheria Creek
  - Sycamore Springs Creek
  - North Fork Kings River
    - Dinkey Creek
    - Basin Creek
      - Patterson Creek
    - Weir Creek
    - Black Rock Creek
    - Williams Creek
    - Mule Creek
    - Rancheria Creek
    - Teakettle Creek
    - Long Meadow Creek
    - Wishon Dam, Wishon Reservoir
    - Woodchuck Creek
    - Short Hair Creek
    - Sharp Creek
    - Helms Creek
      - Courtright Dam, Courtright Reservoir
      - Dusy Creek
    - Post Corral Creek
      - Burnt Corral Creek
    - Flemming Creek
    - Nichols Canyon
    - Meadow Brook
    - Fall Creek
    - Division Lake
    - Regiment Lake
  - Davis Creek
    - Mill Flat Creek
  - Verplank Creek
  - Fox Canyon Creek
  - Converse Creek
  - Spring Creek
  - Cabin Creek
  - Garlic Meadow Creek
  - Rough Creek
  - Ten Mile Creek
  - Middle Fork Kings River
    - Deer Canyon Creek
    - Brush Canyon Creek
    - Tombstone Creek
    - Wren Creek
    - Silver Creek
    - Crown Creek
      - Rogers Creek
    - Gorge of Despair
    - Crystal Creek
    - Blue Canyon Creek
    - Lost Canyon Creek
    - Rattlesnake Creek
    - Alpine Creek
    - Dog Creek
    - Kennedy Creek
    - Dougherty Creek
    - Horseshoe Creek
    - Goddard Creek
      - Disappearing Creek
    - Windy Canyon Creek
    - Cartridge Creek
    - Rimbaud Creek
    - Palisade Creek
      - Cataract Creek
      - Glacier Creek
    - Dusy Branch
    - Helen Lake
  - South Fork Kings River (This is the actual river that flows through Kings Canyon)
    - Lockwood Creek
    - Redwood Creek
    - Windy Gulch
    - Boulder Creek
    - Grizzly Creek
    - Lightning Creek
    - Deer Cove Creek
    - Lewis Creek
      - Comb Creek
    - Sheep Creek
    - Hotel Creek
    - Roaring River
      - Sugarloaf Creek
        - Ferguson Creek
    - Granite Creek
    - Copper Creek
    - Avalanche Creek
    - Bubbs Creek
      - Sphinx Creek
      - Charlotte Creek
      - Cross Creek
      - North Guard Creek
      - East Creek
    - Glacier Creek
    - Gardiner Creek
    - Woods Creek
      - South Fork Woods Creek
    - Arrow Creek
    - Kid Creek

==== Kaweah River ====
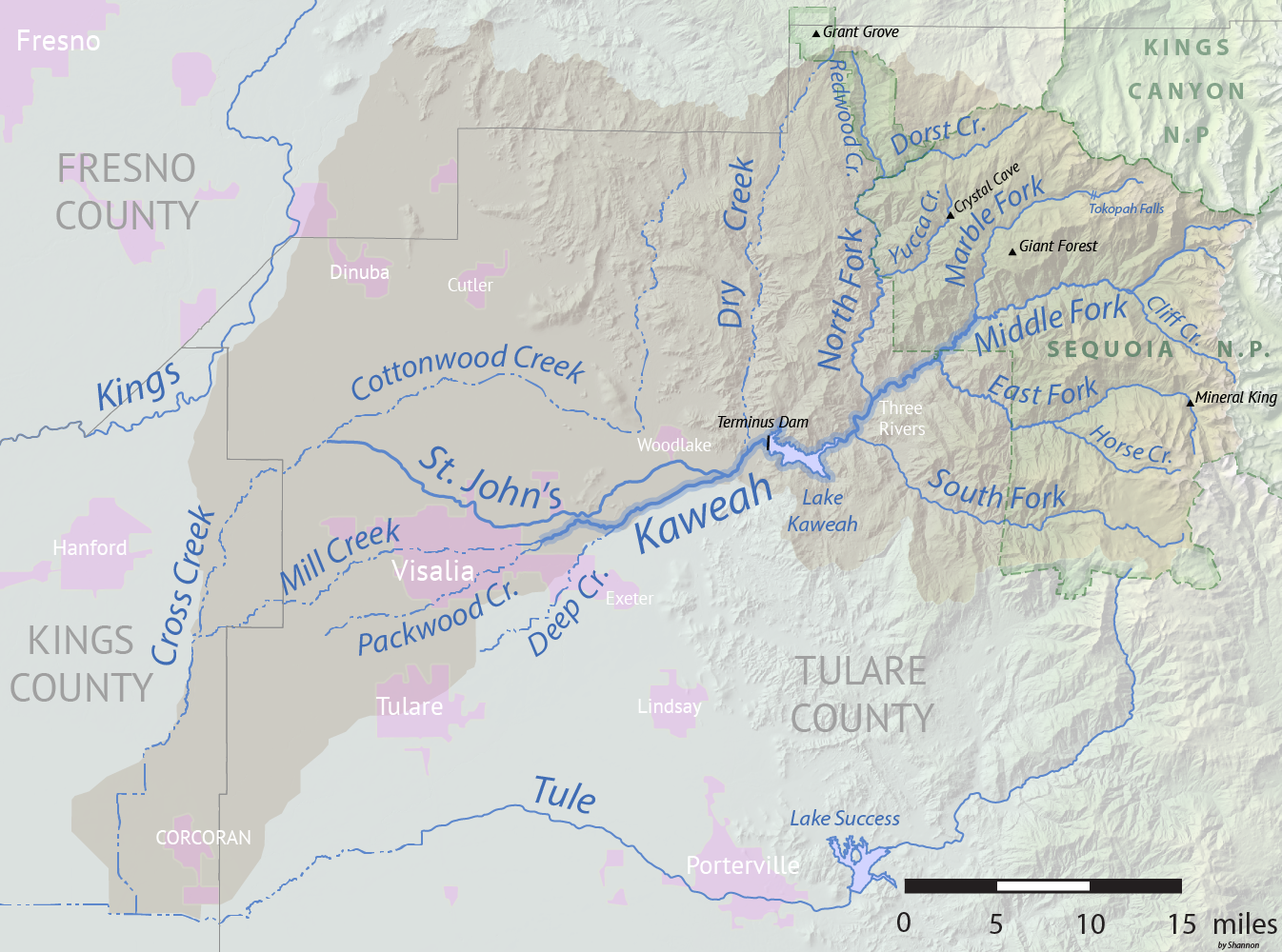
Kaweah River drainage basin

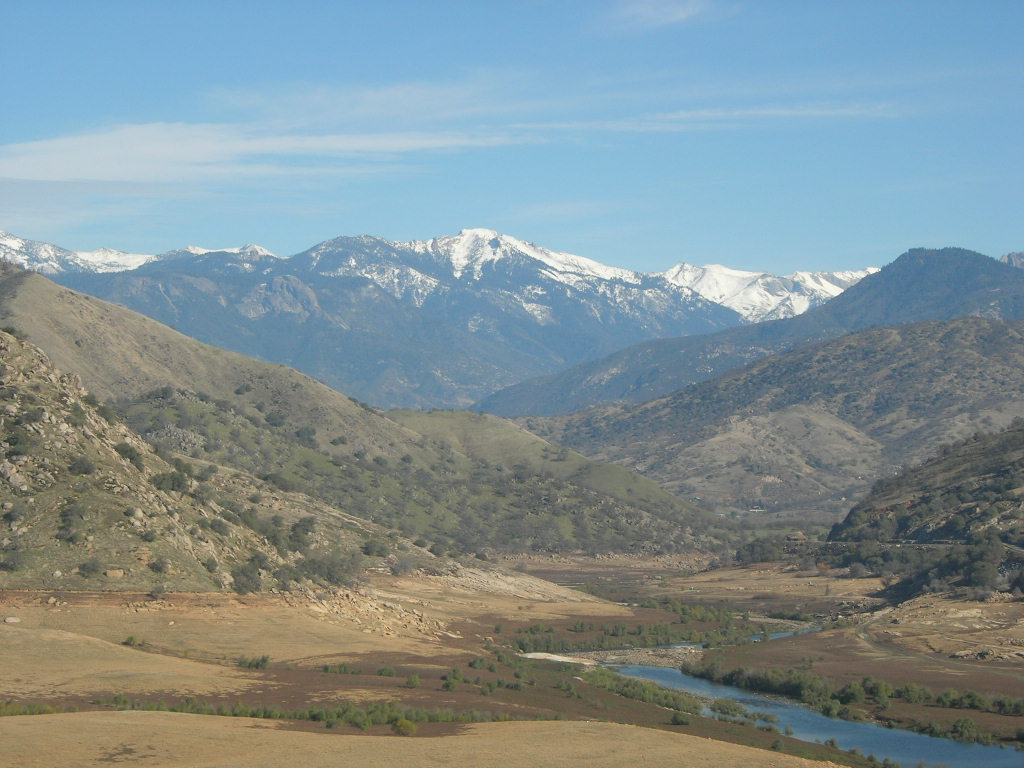
Kaweah River in the foothills of the Sierra

- Kaweah River (Divides into the St. John's River, Mill Creek, Packwood Creek and other distributaries in the San Joaquin Valley. Some of these distributaries eventually rejoin to form Cross Creek, which continues southwest to the Tulare Lake bed.)
  - Yokohl Creek
  - Lime Kiln Creek (Dry Creek)
  - Terminus Dam, Lake Kaweah
  - Greasy Creek
  - Horse Creek
  - South Fork Kaweah River
    - Cinnamon Creek
    - Grouse Creek
  - North Fork Kaweah River
    - Yucca Creek
    - Eshom Creek
    - Redwood Creek
    - Dorst Creek
    - Stony Creek
  - Salt Creek
  - East Fork Kaweah River
    - Squirrel Creek
    - Horse Creek
    - Monarch Creek
    - Eagle Creek
    - Crystal Creek
    - Franklin Creek
  - Marble Fork Kaweah River
    - Elk Creek
    - Suwanee Creek
    - Halstead Creek
    - Sherman Creek
    - Wolverton Creek
    - Clover Creek
    - Silliman Creek
    - Horse Creek
  - Middle Fork Kaweah River
    - Paradise Creek
    - Crescent Creek
    - Dome Creek
    - Panther Creek
    - Mehrten Creek
    - Castle Creek
    - Buck Creek
    - Cliff Creek
      - Timber Gap Creek
    - Granite Creek
    - Eagle Scout Creek
    - Lone Pine Creek
    - Hamilton Creek

==== Tule River ====
- Tule River
  - Deep Creek
    - Elk Bayou
  - Success Dam, Lake Success
  - South Fork Tule River
    - Rocky Creek
    - Bear Creek
  - North Fork Tule River
    - Bear Creek
    - Backbone Creek
    - Pine Creek
  - Middle Fork Tule River
    - North Fork Middle Fork Tule River
      - Alder Creek
    - South Fork Middle Fork Tule River

==== Kern River ====
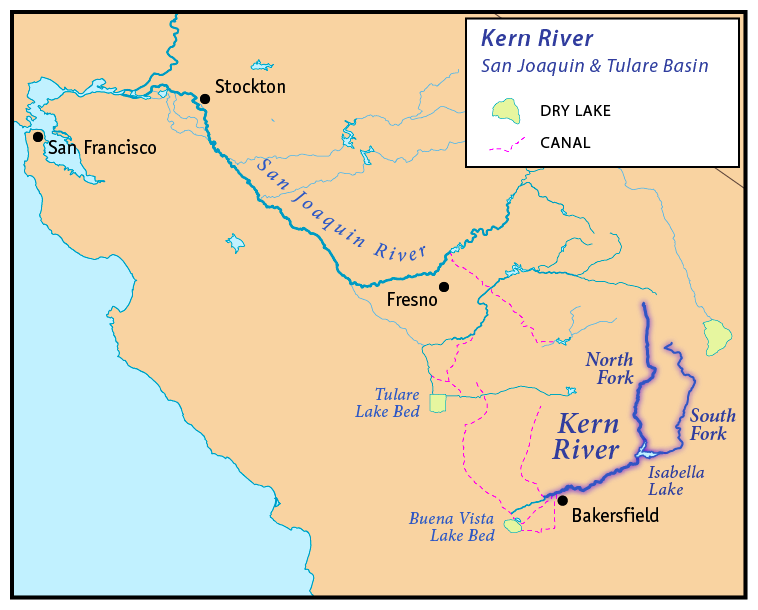
Location of the Kern River

- Kern River
  - Cottonwood Creek
  - Lucas Creek
  - Mill Creek
  - Erskine Creek
  - Isabella Dam, Lake Isabella
  - North Fork Kern River
    - Cannell Creek
    - Salmon Creek
    - Tobias Creek
    - Brush Creek
    - South Creek
    - Dry Meadow Creek
    - Peppermint Creek
    - Durrwood Creek
    - Needlerock Creek
    - Freeman Creek
      - Lloyd Meadows Creek
    - Little Kern River
      - Fish Creek
      - Deep Creek
      - Deep Creek
      - Clicks Creek
      - Sagebrush Gulch
      - Alpine Creek
        - Mountaineer Creek
        - Pecks Canyon Creek
      - Table Meadow Creek
      - Soda Springs Creek
      - Lion Creek
      - Willow Creek
      - Tamrack Creek
      - Rifle Creek
      - Shotgun Creek
        - Pistol Creek
    - Rattlesnake Creek
    - Deadman Canyon Creek
    - Soda Creek
    - Osa Creek
    - Hockett Peak Creek
    - Grouse Canyon Creek
    - Manzanita Canyon Creek
    - Ninemile Creek
      - Cold Meadow Creek
      - Red Rock Creek
      - Long Canyon Creek
        - Long Stringer
        - Lost Trout Creek
    - Hells Hole Creek
    - Angora Creek
    - Hell For Sure Creek
    - Leggett Creek
    - Grasshopper Creek
    - Little Kern Lake Creek
    - Rough Creek
    - Coyote Creek
    - Golden Trout Creek
    - Laurel Creek
    - Rattlesnake Creek
    - Big Arroyo
      - Willow Creek
      - Soda Creek
      - Lost Canyon Creek
    - Funston Creek
    - Chagoopa Creek
    - Rock Creek
      - Siberian Pass Creek
    - Red Spur Creek
    - Whitney Creek
      - Crabtree Creek
    - Wallace Creek
    - Kern-Kaweah River
      - Picket Creek
    - Tyndall Creek
    - Milestone Creek
  - South Fork Kern River
    - Kelso Creek
    - Canebrake Creek
    - Bartolas Creek
    - Palome Creek
    - Long Valley Creek
    - Taylor Creek
    - Manter Creek
    - Tibbets Creek
    - Trout Creek
    - Fish Creek
    - Bitter Creek
    - Lost Creek
    - Crag Creek
    - Honeybee Creek
    - Summit Creek
    - Cow Canyon Creek
    - Snake Creek
    - Soda Creek
    - Monache Creek
    - Schaefer Stringer
    - Strawberry Creek
    - Long Stringer
    - Dry Creek
    - Mulkey Creek
    - Movie Stringer
    - Lewis Stringer
    - Kern Peak Stringer

== Central Coast ==
Rivers that empty into the Pacific Ocean between the Golden Gate and Point Arguello, arranged in order from north to south.

For details of the San Mateo coast, see List of watercourses in the San Francisco Bay Area.

- San Gregorio Creek
- Pescadero Creek
  - Butano Creek
    - Little Butano Creek
    - South Fork Butano Creek
    - North Fork Butano Creek
  - Honsinger Creek
  - Peters Creek
  - Fall Creek
  - Waterman Creek
- San Vicente Creek (Santa Cruz County)
- San Lorenzo River
  - Carbonera Creek
  - Zayante Creek
    - Bean Creek
- Pajaro River (jump to tributaries)
- Elkhorn Slough
  - Carneros Creek
- Salinas River (jump to tributaries)
- Carmel River
- Malpaso Creek
- Little Sur River
- Big Sur River
  - Pfeiffer-Redwood Creek
- McWay Creek
- Old Creek
- Toro Creek
- Morro Creek
- Chorro Creek
- Los Osos Creek
- San Luis Obispo Creek
- Pismo Creek
- Arroyo Grande Creek
  - Los Berros Creek
  - Tar Spring Creek
- Santa Maria River (jump to tributaries)
- San Antonio Creek
- Santa Ynez River (jump to tributaries)

=== Pajaro River ===
- Pajaro River
  - Pacheco Creek
  - San Benito River
    - Clear Creek
  - Tres Piños Creek
  - Salsipuedes Creek
    - Corralitos Creek

=== Salinas River ===
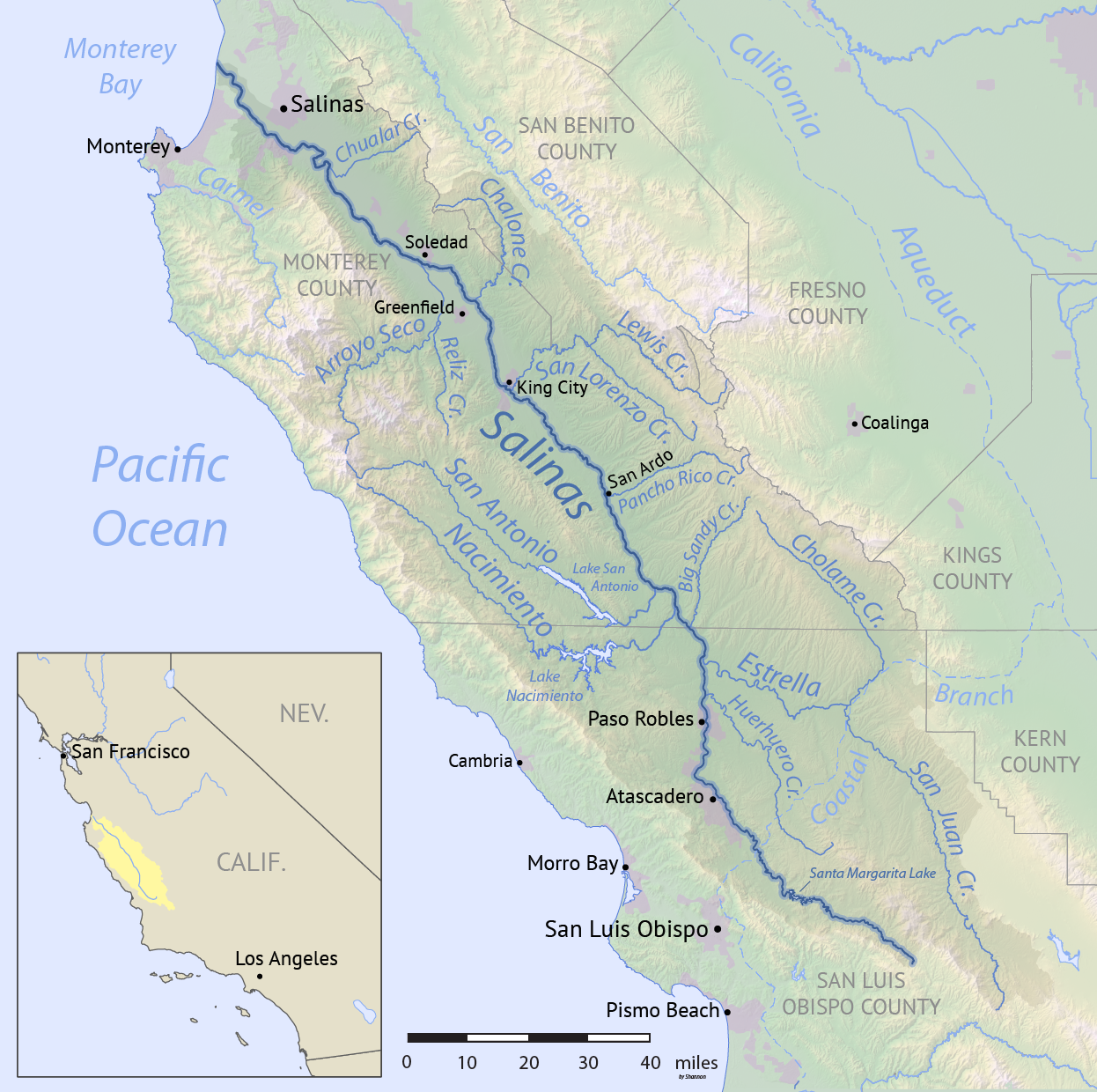
Salinas River drainage basin

- Salinas River
  - Gabilan Creek
  - Chualar Creek
  - Arroyo Seco
    - Reliz Creek
    - Vaqueros Creek
    - Santa Lucia Creek
    - Tassajara Creek
    - Lost Valley Creek
  - Chalone Creek
    - Topo Creek
  - Monroe Creek
  - San Lorenzo Creek
    - Lewis Creek
  - Pine Creek
  - Pancho Rico Creek
  - Sargent Creek
  - San Antonio River
    - San Antonio Dam, San Antonio Lake
    - Jolon Creek
    - Mission Creek
    - North Fork San Antonio River
  - Nacimiento River
    - Nacimiento Dam, Lake Nacimiento
    - Las Tablas Creek
    - Little Burnett Creek
    - Los Bueyes Creek
    - Gabilan Creek
    - Stony Creek
    - San Miguel Creek
    - Negro Fork
  - Big Sandy Creek
  - Estrella River
    - Huerhuero Creek
    - Cholame Creek
      - Little Cholame Creek
    - San Juan Creek
  - Paso Robles Creek
  - Atascadero Creek
  - Santa Margarita Creek
  - Rinconadas Creek
  - Pilitas Creek
  - Salinas Dam, Santa Margarita Lake
  - Alamo Creek
  - Toro Creek
  - Pozo Creek

=== Santa Maria River ===
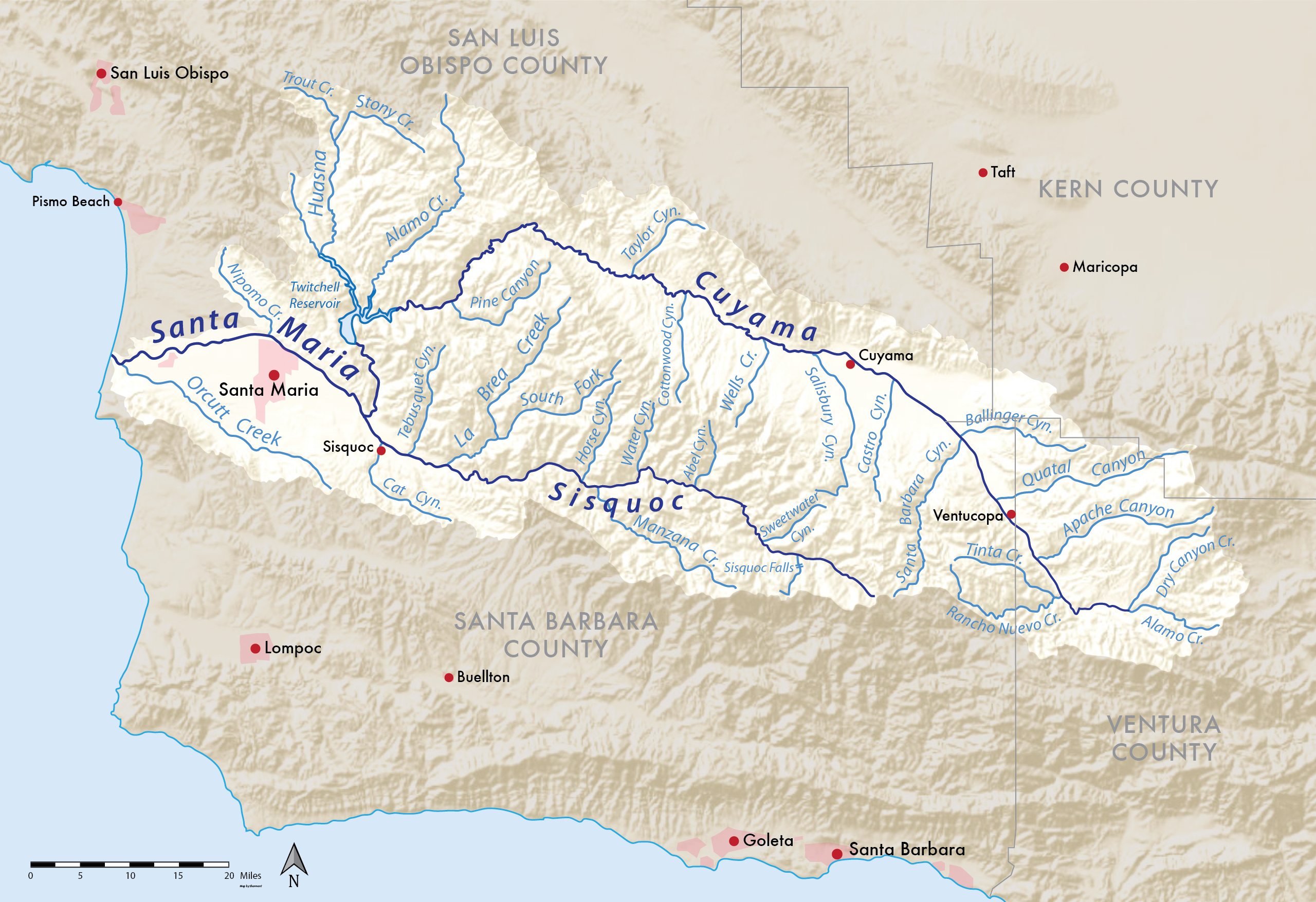
Santa Maria River drainage basin

- Santa Maria River
  - Nipomo Creek
  - Orcutt Creek
  - Cuyama River
    - Twitchell Dam, Twitchell Reservoir
    - Huasna River
      - Huasna Creek
      - Arroyo Seco
      - Stony Creek
      - Trout Creek
    - Alamo Creek
      - Jollo Creek
    - Aliso Creek
    - Santa Barbara Canyon
    - Quatal Canyon
    - Apache Canyon
    - Alamo Creek
  - Sisquoc River
    - Tepusquet Creek
    - La Brea Creek
      - North Fork La Brea Creek
      - South Fork La Brea Creek
    - Manzana Creek
    - Water Canyon
    - Abel Canyon
    - South Fork Sisquoc River

=== Santa Ynez River ===
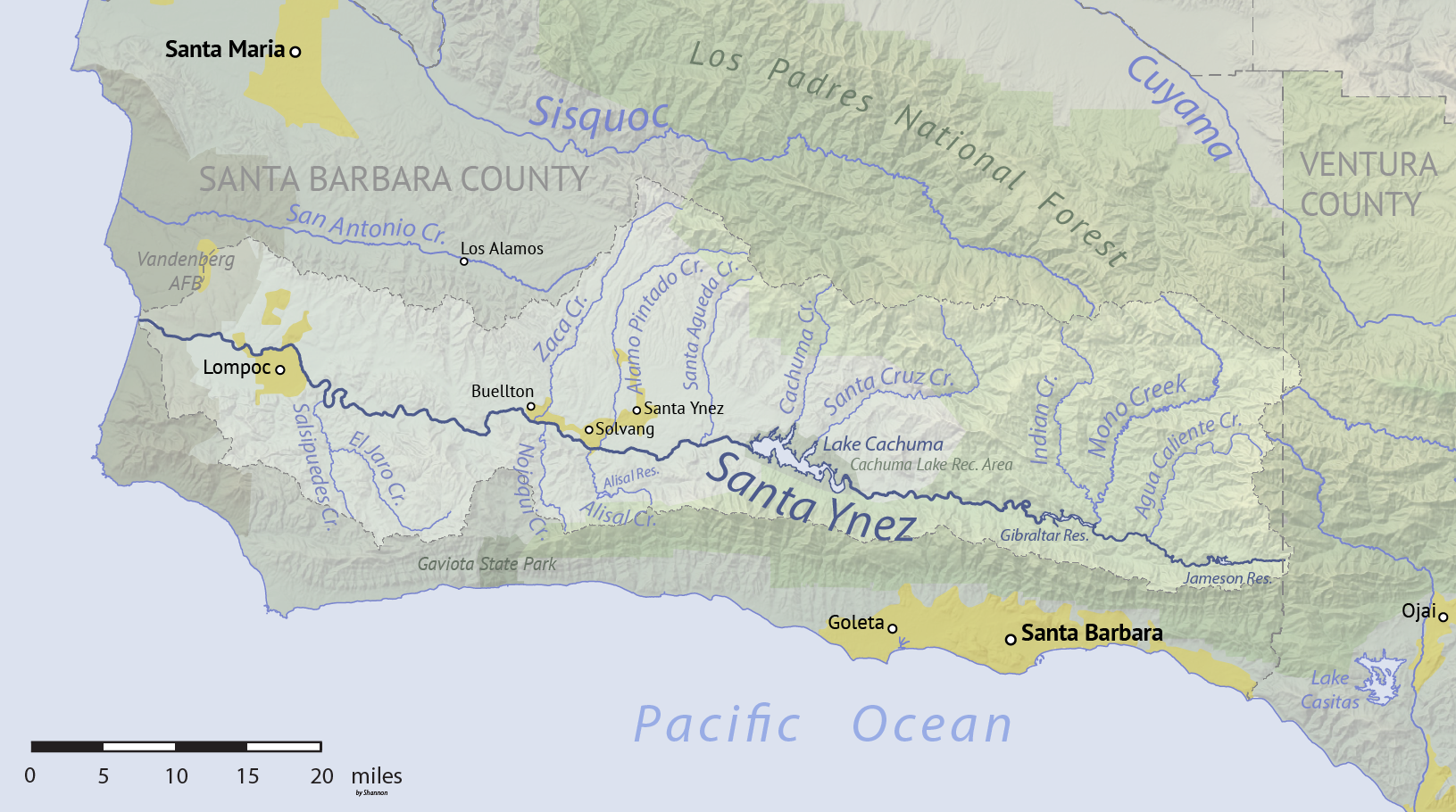
Santa Ynez River drainage basin

- Santa Ynez River
  - Salsipuedes Creek
    - El Jaro Creek
  - Zaca Creek
  - Nojoqui Creek
  - Alisal Creek
  - Alamo Pintado Creek
  - Calabazal Creek
  - Santa Agueda Creek
  - Bradbury Dam, Lake Cachuma
  - Cachuma Creek
  - Santa Cruz Creek
  - Mono Creek
    - Indian Creek
  - Agua Caliente Creek
  - Juncal Creek

== South Coast ==
Rivers that empty into the Pacific Ocean southeast of Point Arguello, arranged from north to south:

=== Point Arguello to Santa Monica ===
- Goleta Slough
  - Carneros Creek
  - Atascadero Creek
- Montecito Creek
  - Cold Springs Creek
    - East Fork Cold Springs Creek
    - West Fork Cold Springs Creek
- Oak Creek
- San Ysidro Creek
- Romero Creek
  - Picay Creek
- Toro Canyon Creek
  - Garapata Creek
- Arroyo Paredon
- Santa Monica Creek
  - Franklin Creek
- Carpinteria Creek
  - Gobernador Creek
    - Eldorado Creek
    - Steer Creek
- Rincon Creek
  - Casitas Creek
  - Sulphur Creek
  - Catharina Creek
- Los Sauces Creek
- Madrianio Creek
- Padre Juan Canyon
- Ventura River (jump to tributaries)
- Santa Clara River (jump to tributaries)
- Calleguas Creek
- Malibu Creek
- Topanga Creek

==== Santa Clara River ====
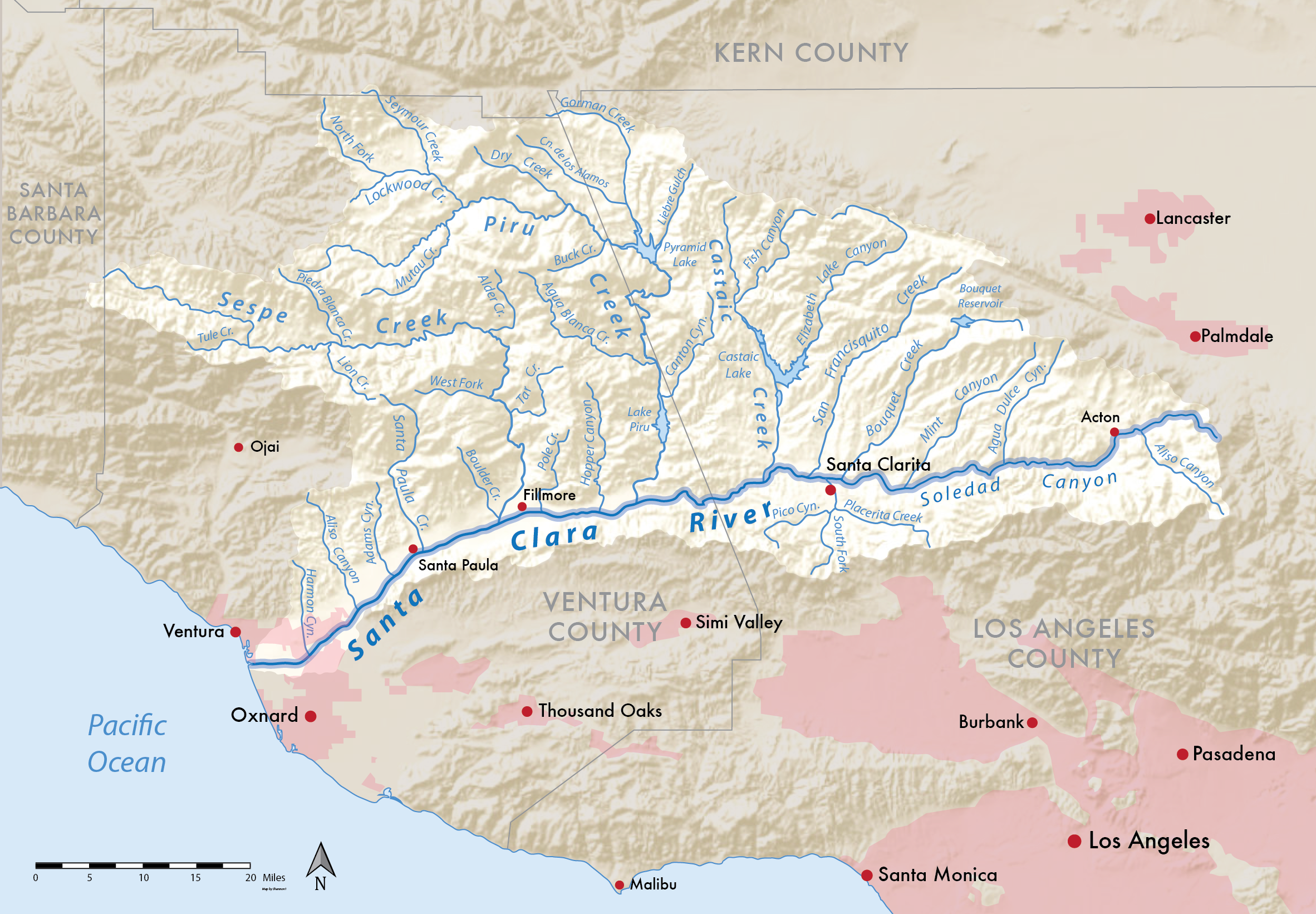
Santa Clara River drainage basin

- Santa Clara River
  - Santa Paula Creek
    - Sisar Creek
  - Boulder Creek
  - Sespe Creek
    - Little Sespe Creek
    - Tar Creek
    - West Fork Sespe Creek
    - Alder Creek
    - Park Creek
    - Timber Creek
    - Trout Creek
    - Piedra Blanca Creek
    - Rose Valley Creek
    - Rock Creek
    - Potrero John Creek
    - Munson Creek
    - Cherry Creek
    - Adobe Creek
    - Abadi Creek
  - Hopper Canyon Creek
  - Piru Creek
    - Santa Felicia Dam, Lake Piru
    - Devil Canyon
    - Canton Canyon
    - Agua Blanca Creek
    - Fish Creek
    - Pyramid Dam, Pyramid Lake
    - Gorman Creek
    - Buck Creek
    - Snowy Creek
    - Smith Fork
    - Dry Creek
    - Lockwood Creek
    - Mutau Creek
      - Alamo Creek
      - Little Mutau Creek
    - Sheep Creek
    - Cedar Creek
  - Castaic Creek
    - Charlie Canyon
    - Violin Canyon
    - Castaic Dam, Castaic Lake
    - Elizabeth Lake Canyon
      - Pine Canyon
    - Fish Canyon
    - Salt Creek
  - Bouquet Canyon
  - South Fork Santa Clara River
    - Placerita Creek
    - Newhall Creek
  - Mint Canyon
  - Agua Dulce Canyon
  - Mill Canyon
  - Acton Canyon
  - Aliso Canyon
  - Kentucky Springs Canyon

==== Ventura River ====
- Ventura River
  - Manuel Canyon
  - Cañada Larga
  - Cañada de Alisos
  - Coyote Creek
    - Lake Casitas
      - Laguna Creek
      - Willow Creek
      - Santa Ana Creek
        - Roble-Casitas Canal
      - Poplin Creek
    - Deep Cat Lake
    - East Fork Coyote Creek
    - West Fork Coyote Creek
  - Matilija Creek
    - Rattlesnake Creek
    - Lime Creek
    - Murietta Creek
    - Middle Fork Matilija Creek
    - Upper North Fork Matilija Creek
  - North Fork Matilija Creek (This and Matilija Creek form the Ventura River's headwaters.)

=== Santa Monica to San Clemente ===
- Ballona Creek
- Dominguez Channel
- Los Angeles River (jump to tributaries)
- San Gabriel River (jump to tributaries)
- Santa Ana River (jump to tributaries)
- Newport Bay and Upper Newport Bay estuary
  - Big Canyon (Newport Bay)
  - San Diego Creek
    - Peters Canyon Wash
    - Agua Chinon Creek
    - Serrano Creek
  - Big Canyon Creek
- Laguna Canyon
  - El Toro Creek
  - Laguna Lakes
- Aliso Creek
  - Wood Canyon Creek
  - Sulphur Creek
- Salt Creek
- San Juan Creek
  - Trabuco Creek
    - Oso Creek
    - Tijeras Canyon Creek
  - Cañada Gobernadora
  - Bell Canyon
  - Hot Springs Creek
- Prima Deshecha Cañada
- Segunda Deshecha Cañada

==== Los Angeles River ====
- Los Angeles River
  - Compton Creek
  - Rio Hondo
    - Santa Anita Creek
  - Arroyo Seco
  - Verdugo Wash
  - Burbank Western Channel
  - Tujunga Wash
    - Big Tujunga Creek
      - Lucas Creek
      - Mill Creek
      - Alder Creek
    - Little Tujunga Creek
    - Pacoima Wash
  - Bull Creek
  - Aliso Creek
    - Limekiln Canyon
    - Wilbur Canyon
  - Browns Canyon Wash
    - Diablo Canyon Creek
    - Mormon Canyon Creek
  - Bell Creek
    - Dayton Creek
    - Woolsey Canyon Creek
  - Arroyo Calabasas
    - Dry Creek

==== San Gabriel River ====
- San Gabriel River
  - Coyote Creek
    - Carbon Creek
    - Moody Creek
    - Fullerton Creek
    - La Canada Verde Creek
      - La Mirada Creek
    - Brea Creek
      - San Jose Flood Diversion Channel
      - Tonner Canyon
    - Imperial Creek
  - East Fork San Gabriel River
  - West Fork San Gabriel River

==== Santa Ana River ====
- Santa Ana River
  - Greenville-Banning Channel
  - Santiago Creek
    - Black Star Canyon Creek
    - Silverado Canyon
  - Brush Creek
  - Aliso Creek
  - Fresno Canyon
  - Wardlow Wash
  - Chino Creek
    - Mill Creek
      - Etiwanda Creek
      - Cucamonga Creek
      - Deer Creek
    - San Antonio Creek
  - Temescal Creek
    - Cajalco Canyon
      - Lake Mathews
    - Coldwater Canyon Creek
    - Lake Elsinore
      - San Jacinto River
        - Salt Creek
        - North Fork San Jacinto River
        - South Fork San Jacinto River
  - Warm Creek
    - Lytle Creek
      - Cajon Wash
      - South Fork Lytle Creek
      - Middle Fork Lytle Creek
      - North Fork Lytle Creek
  - City Creek
  - Plunge Creek
  - Mill Creek
    - Frustration Creek
    - Monkeyface Creek
    - Falls Creek
    - Vivian Creek
  - Morton Creek
  - Deep Creek
  - Government Creek
  - Warm Springs Creek
  - Alder Creek
  - Keller Creek
    - Monroe Creek
  - Crystal Creek
  - Breakneck Creek
  - Bear Creek
    - Big Bear Lake
  - South Fork Santa Ana River
  - Lost Creek
  - Wildhorse Creek
  - Cienaga Seca Creek
  - Heart Bar Creek
  - Coon Creek

=== San Clemente to Mexican border ===
- San Mateo Creek
  - Cristianitos Creek
    - Talega Creek
    - Gabino Creek
      - La Paz Creek
  - Devil Canyon Creek
    - Cold Spring Canyon Creek
  - Nickel Creek (San Mateo Creek)
  - Bluewater Creek
  - Tenaja Creek
  - Los Alamos Canyon Creek
    - Wildhorse Canyon Creek
- San Onofre Creek
  - South Fork San Onofre Creek
  - North Fork San Onofre Creek
    - Jardine Creek
- Foley Creek
- Horno Creek
- Las Flores Creek
  - Piedra de Lumbre Canyon Creek
- Aliso Creek (San Diego County)
- French Creek (San Diego County)
- Cockleburr Creek
- Santa Margarita River (jump to tributaries)
- San Luis Rey River (jump to tributaries)
- Loma Alta Creek
- Buena Vista Lagoon
  - Buena Vista Creek
- Agua Hedionda Lagoon
  - Agua Hedionda Creek
    - Buena Creek (San Diego)
    - Escondido Creek
- San Dieguito River (jump to tributaries)
- San Diego River (jump to tributaries) - historically drained into San Diego Bay, but modern flood control channel bypasses the north shore of the bay and empties directly to the Pacific Ocean)
- San Diego Bay outlet (jump to tributaries)
- Tijuana River

==== Santa Margarita River ====
- Santa Margarita River
  - Newton Canyon
  - Pueblitos Canyon
  - Wood Canyon
  - DeLuz Creek
  - Sandia Creek
  - Rainbow Creek
  - Temecula Creek
    - Pechanga Creek
    - Vail Lake Dam, Vail Lake
      - Kolb Creek
        - Arroyo Seco Creek
      - Wilson Creek
    - Long Canyon
    - Cottonwood Creek
    - Tule Creek
    - Chihuahua Creek
    - Rattlesnake Creek
    - Kohler Canyon
  - Murrieta Creek
    - Empire Creek
      - Long Canyon
    - Santa Gertrudis Creek
      - Tucalota Creek
        - Rawson Canyon
      - Long Valley Creek
    - Warm Springs Creek
      - French Valley Creek
    - Kalmia Creek
    - Miller Canyon Creek
    - Cole Canyon Creek
    - Vail Canyon Creek
      - Slaughterhouse Canyon
    - Bundy Canyon

==== San Luis Rey River ====
- San Luis Rey River
  - West Fork San Luis Rey River

==== San Dieguito River ====
- San Dieguito River
  - Santa Maria Creek (San Diego)
  - Santa Ysabel Creek
    - Temescal Creek (San Diego)

==== San Diego River ====
- San Diego River
  - Oak Canyon Creek
  - Spring Canyon Creek
  - Forester Creek
  - Los Coches Creek
  - San Vicente Creek
  - Wildcat Canyon Creek
  - Chocolate Creek
  - Conejos Creek
  - Sand Creek
  - Isham Creek
  - Boulder Creek
  - Cedar Creek
  - Ritchie Creek
  - Dye Canyon Creek
  - Iron Springs Canyon Creek
  - Temescal Creek
  - Sentenac Creek
  - Coleman Creek
    - Baily Creek
    - Eastwood Creek

==== San Diego Bay ====
Tributaries entering San Diego Bay are arranged from North to South:

- Chollas Creek
- Paradise Creek
- Sweetwater River
- Otay River

== Gulf of California ==
Rivers that empty into the Gulf of California:

- Colorado River
  - Milpitas Wash
  - McCoy Wash
  - Gene Wash
  - Chemehuevi Wash
  - Piute Wash

== Carrizo Plain ==
The Carrizo Plain is a large enclosed valley near the Central Coast which drains into Soda Lake.

- Wallace Creek

== Salton Sea ==
Rivers that empty into the Salton Sea:

- Salt Creek
  - Dos Palmas Creek
  - Red Canyon Wash
- Box Canyon Wash
- Whitewater River
  - North Fork Whitewater River
  - Middle Fork Whitewater River
  - South Fork Whitewater River
  - San Gorgonio River
    - Potrero Creek
    - Smith Creek
      - Montgomery Creek
    - Hathaway Creek
    - Twin Pines Creek
      - Brown Creek
    - One Horse Creek
    - Snow Creek
      - West Fork Snow Creek
        - East Branch Snow Creek
      - East Fork Snow Creek
      - Falls Creek
  - Garnet Wash
    - Super Creek
  - Mission Creek
    - North Fork Mission Creek
    - South Form Mission Creek
    - West Fork Mission Creek
  - Morongo Wash
    - Dry Morongo Wash
      - Dry Morongo Creek
    - Big Morongo Wash
    - Little Morongo Wash
  - Chino Canyon Wash
  - Palm Canyon Wash
    - Tahquitz Creek
      - Tahquitz Falls
  - Cathedral Canyon Wash
  - Deep Canyon Stormwater Channel
    - Dead Indian Creek
      - Grape Vine Creek
      - Ebbens Creek
      - Carrizo Creek
      - Cat Creek
      - Ramon Creek
    - Deep Canyon Creek
      - Sheep Creek
      - Coyote Creek
  - Thousand Palm Canyon Wash
- Barton Canyon Wash
  - Alano Canyon Wash
  - Sheep Canyon Wash
- Travertine Palms Wash
- Garner Wash
- Wonderstone Wash
- Gravel Wash
- Big Wash
- Grave Wash
- Coral Wash
- Palm Wash
- Anza Ditch
- Arroyo Salada
- Tule Wash
- San Felipe Creek
  - Carrizo Creek, Carrizo Wash
  - Borrego Sink Wash
- New River
  - Coyote Wash
    - Palm Canyon Wash
    - South Fork Coyote Wash
    - Myer Creek
  - Pinto Wash
- Alamo River

== Great Basin ==
Rivers in the Great Basin, arranged roughly north to south:

=== Tule Lake ===
- Lost River
  - Rock Creek
  - Clear Lake Reservoir
  - Willow Creek
    - North Fork Willow Creek
    - Boles Creek
      - Fletcher Creek

=== Honey Lake ===
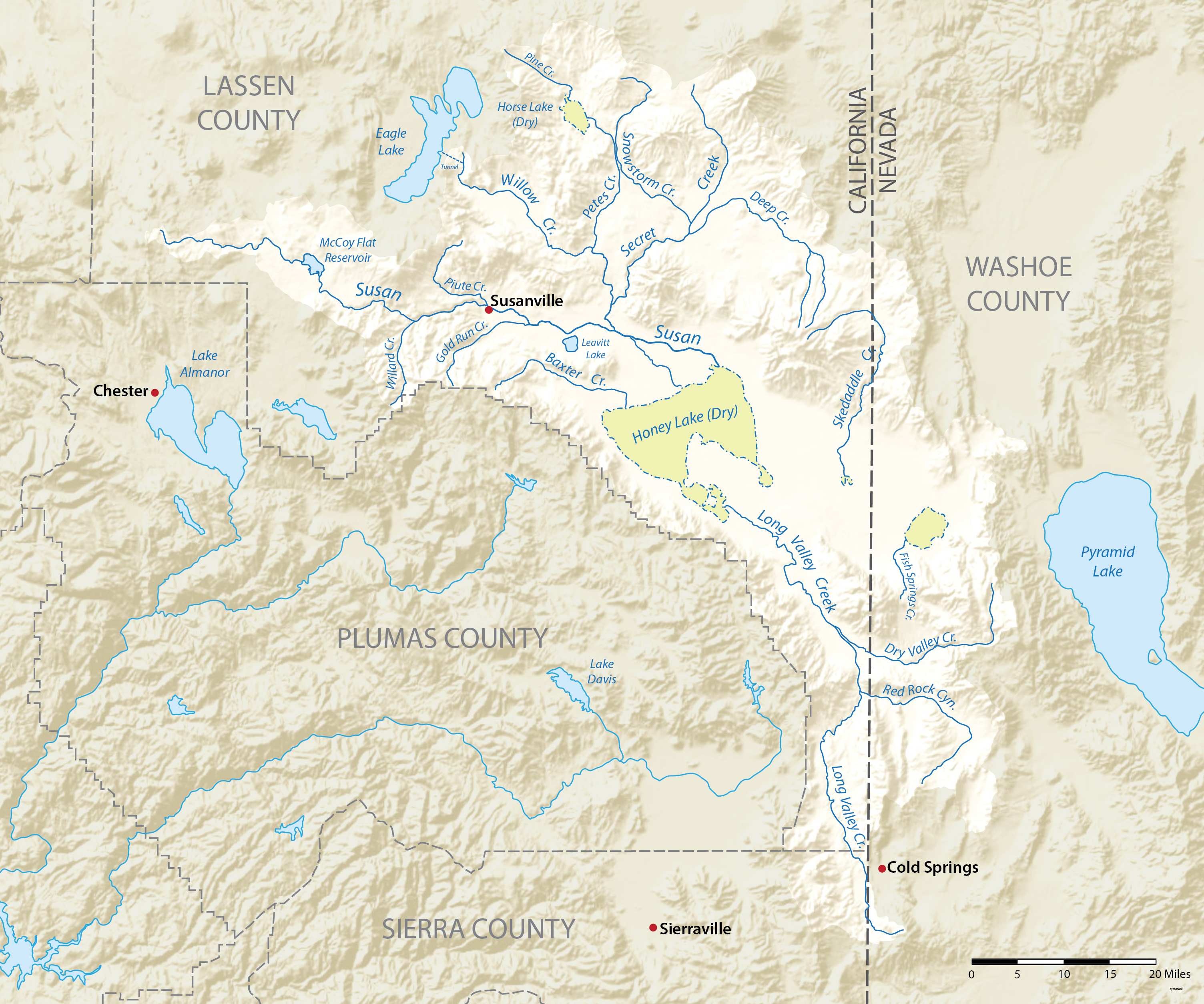
Honey Lake drainage basin

- Susan River
  - Willow Creek
    - Petes Creek
    - Balls Canyon
      - Snowstorm Creek
      - Secret Creek
  - Piute Creek
  - Willard Creek
- Skedaddle Creek
- Long Valley Creek
  - Dry Valley Creek
- Baxter Creek

=== Pyramid Lake (in Nevada) ===
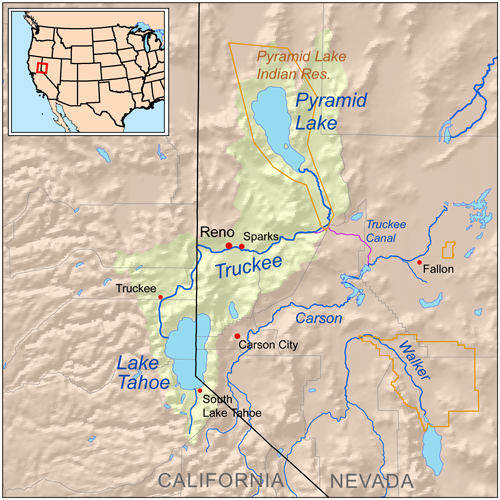
Pyramid Lake drainage basin

- Truckee River
  - Little Truckee River
  - Martis Creek
  - Prosser Creek
  - Trout Creek
  - Cold Creek
  - Lake Tahoe (tributaries clockwise from Lower Truckee River)
    - Griff Creek
    - Incline Creek
    - North Canyon Creek
    - Trout Creek (Lake Tahoe)
    - Upper Truckee River
    - Taylor Creek
    - Meeks Creek
    - Blackwood Creek
    - Ward Creek

=== Carson Sink (in Nevada) ===
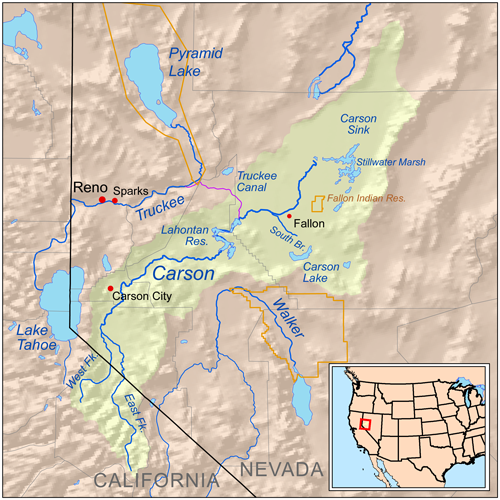
Carson Sink drainage basin

- Carson River (in Nevada)
  - East Fork Carson River
    - Markleeville Creek
      - Hot Springs Creek
      - Pleasant Valley Creek
    - Monitor Creek
    - Silver Creek
    - Wolf Creek
    - Silver King Creek
  - West Fork Carson River
    - Willow Creek
    - Red Lake Creek

=== Walker Lake (in Nevada) ===
- Walker River (in Nevada)
  - East Walker River
    - Buckeye Creek
      - Swauger Creek
    - Robinson Creek
    - Green Creek
  - West Walker River
    - Mill Creek
      - Lost Cannon Creek
    - Deep Creek
    - Little Walker River
      - Hot Creek
      - Molybdenite Creek
    - Silver Creek
    - Wolf Creek
    - Leavitt Creek
    - West Fork West Walker River

=== Mono Lake ===
Rivers draining into saline and endorheic Mono Lake in eastern California, from north and proceeding counterclockwise:

- Cottonwood Creek
- Rancheria Gulch
- Wilson Creek
- Mill Creek
  - Deer Creek
  - South Fork Mill Creek
    - Lake Canyon Creek
- Dechambeau Creek
- Lee Vining Creek
  - Beartrack Creek
  - Gibbs Canyon Creek
  - Warren Fork
  - Mine Creek
    - Glacier Canyon Creek
  - Saddlebag Creek
- Rush Creek
  - Walker Creek
  - Parker Creek
  - Alger Creek
  - Reversed Creek
    - Fern Creek
    - Yost Creek
  - Crest Creek
- Dry Creek

=== Owens Lake ===
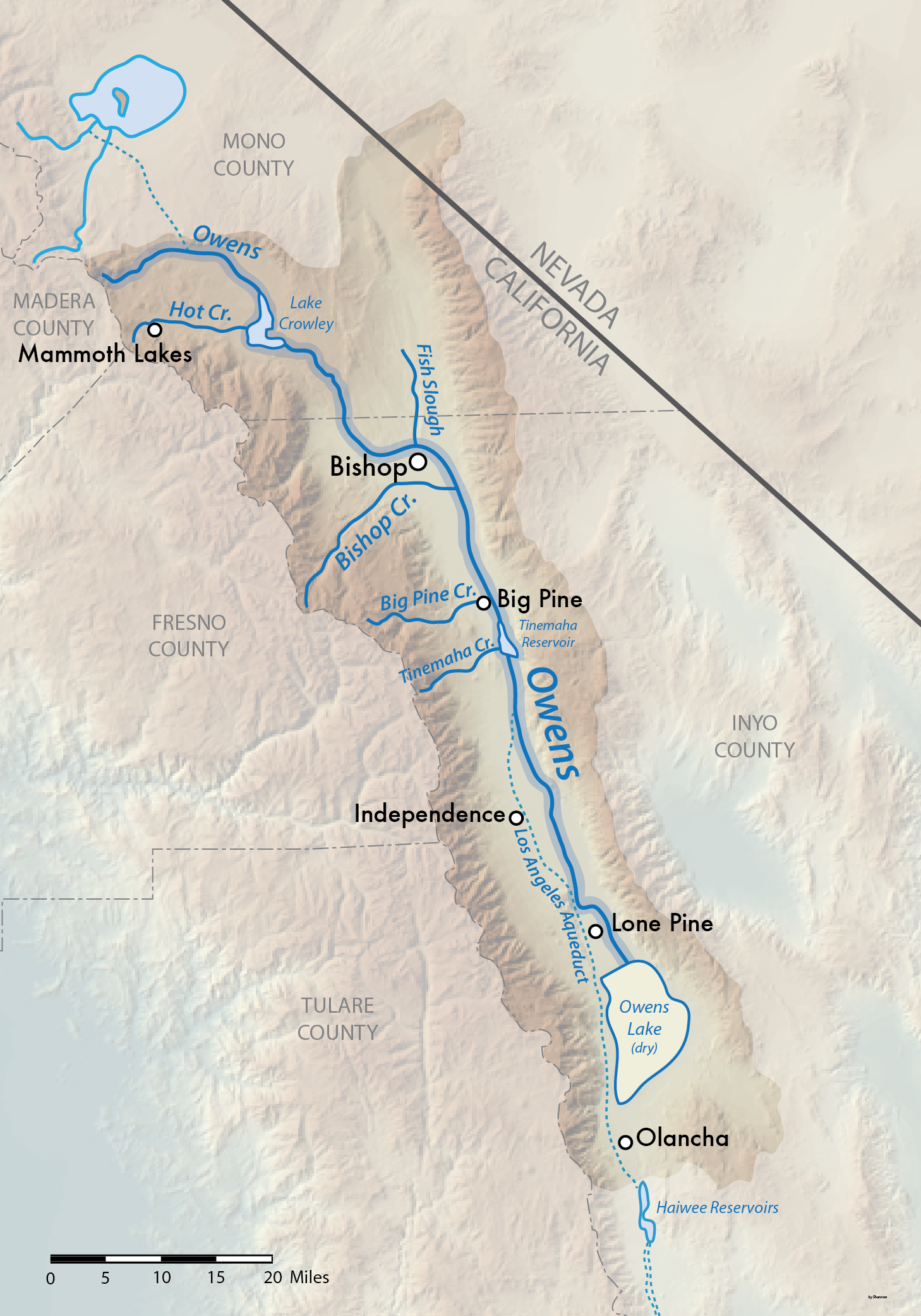
Owens Lake drainage basin

- Owens River
  - Lone Pine Creek
  - Big Pine Creek
  - Bishop Creek
  - Rock Creek
    - Pine Creek
      - Morgan Creek
  - Hot Creek
  - Deadman Creek

=== Death Valley ===
Streams terminating in the Badwater Basin in Death Valley National Park.

- Salt Creek
  - Furnace Creek Wash
  - Emigrant Wash
  - Death Valley Wash
- Amargosa River
  - Wingate Wash
  - Salt Creek (may carry overflow from the Mojave River basin in extremely wet years)
  - Rock Valley Wash
  - Fortymile Wash

=== Antelope Valley-Fremont Valley watersheds ===
Streams terminating in various dry lakes in the Antelope Valley and Fremont Valley (Koehn Lake, Rosamond Lake, Rogers Dry Lake and others), draining from the southeastern Tehachapi Mountains and northern San Gabriel Mountains, listed counterclockwise starting from north:

- Cottonwood Creek
- Cache Creek
  - Sand Creek
- Oak Creek
- Cottonwood Creek
- Pescado Creek
- Los Alamos Creek
- Amargosa Creek
  - Pine Creek
- Anaverde Creek
- Little Rock Creek
  - South Fork Little Rock Creek
- Big Rock Creek
  - Pallett Creek
  - Sandrock Creek
  - South Fork Big Rock Creek
- Mescal Creek
- Le Montaine Creek

=== Soda Lake (Mojave River drainage) ===
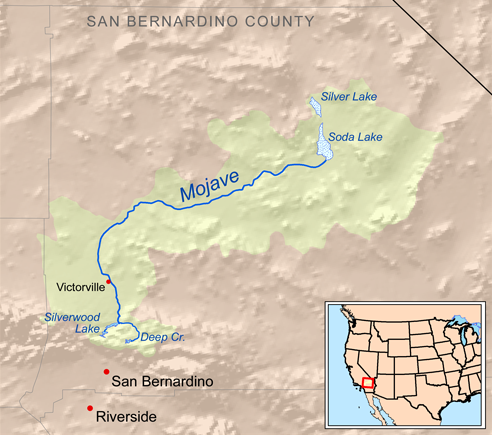
Mojave River drainage basin

- Kelso Wash
- Mojave River
  - Manix Wash
  - Daggett Wash
  - Wild Wash
  - Buckthorn Wash
  - Fremont Wash
  - West Fork Mojave River
    - Grass Valley Creek
    - East Fork West Fork Mojave River
  - Deep Creek
    - Kinley Creek
    - Willow Creek
    - Coxey Creek
    - Holcomb Creek
      - Cox Creek
    - Hooks Creek
      - Little Bear Creek
    - Shake Creek
    - Sheep Creek
    - Crab Creek
    - Green Valley Creek

== See also ==
- Geography of California
- List of lakes in California
- List of rivers of the Americas by coastline
- List of rivers of the United States
- Water in California
