= Stanislaus River =

River in north-central California, US

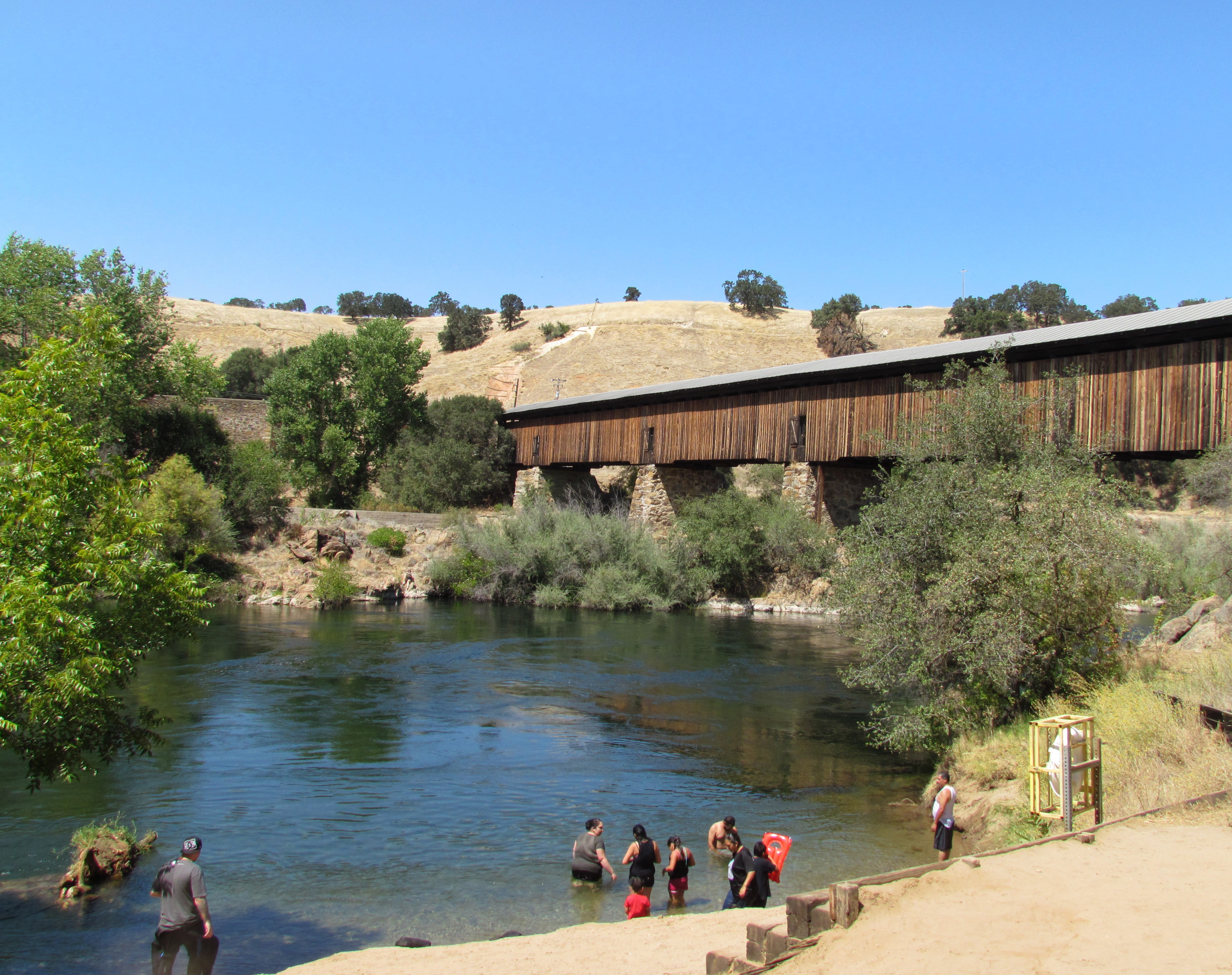
- Stanislaus River at the historic covered bridge in Knights Ferry

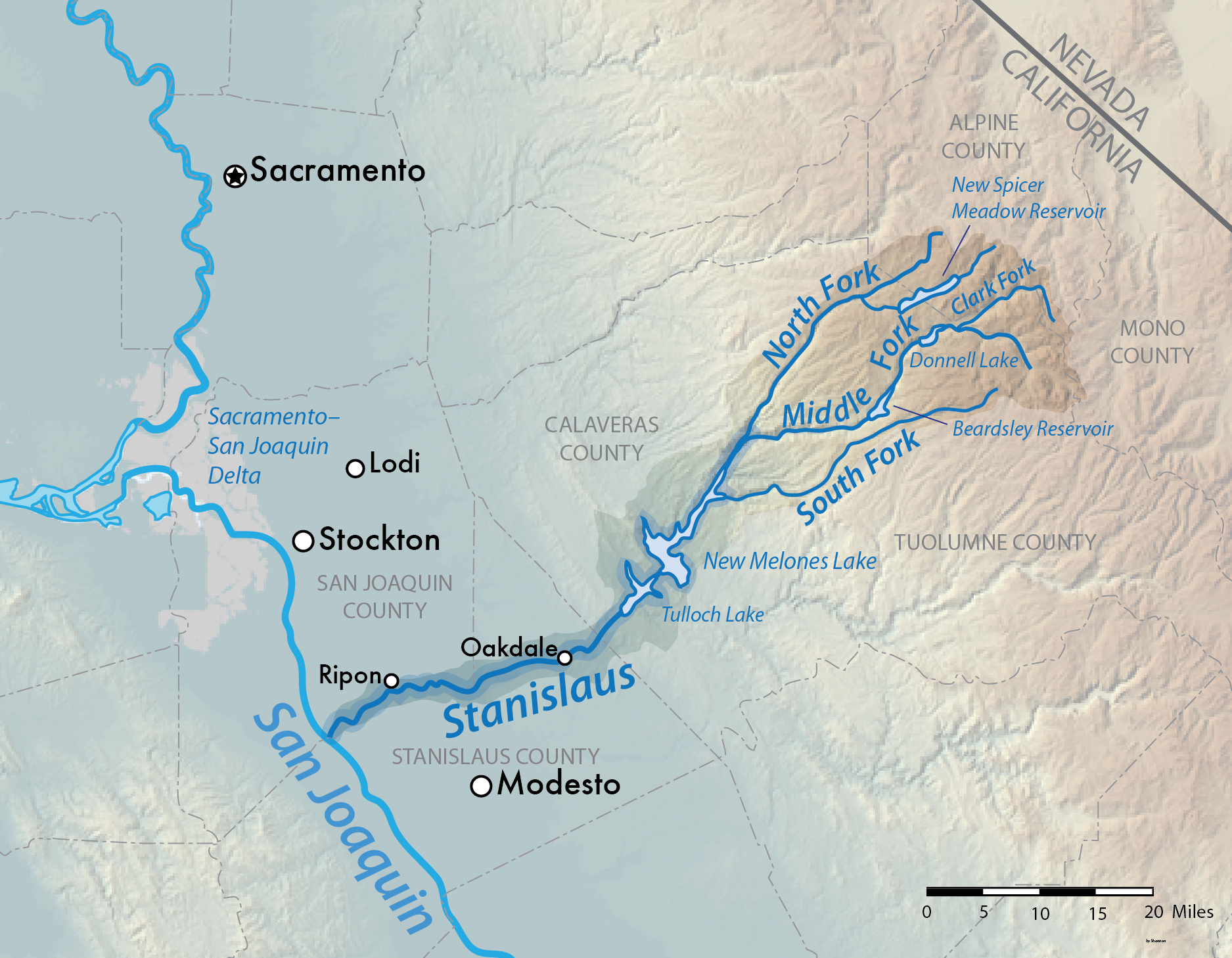
- Map of the Stanislaus River watershed

Location
- Country: United States
- State: California
- Counties: Alpine, Calaveras, San Joaquin, Stanislaus, Tuolumne

Physical characteristics
- Source: Middle Fork Stanislaus River–Kennedy Creek
  - location: Near Leavitt Peak, Tuolumne County
  - coordinates: 38°14′21″N 119°36′43″W
  - elevation: 9,635 ft (2,937 m)
- 2nd source: North Fork Stanislaus River
  - location: Mosquito Lake, Alpine County
  - coordinates: 38°30′54″N 119°54′52″W
  - elevation: 8,075 ft (2,461 m)
- Source confluence: Camp Nine
  - location: near Hathaway Pines, Calaveras
  - coordinates: 38°09′15″N 120°21′27″W
  - elevation: 1,238 ft (377 m)
- Mouth: San Joaquin River
  - location: Near Vernalis, San Joaquin
  - coordinates: 37°39′54″N 121°14′27″W
  - elevation: 20 ft (6.1 m)
- Length: 95.9 mi (154.3 km)
- Basin size: 1,075 sq mi (2,780 km^{2})
- Discharge
  - location: Ripon, about 15 mi (24 km) above the mouth
  - average: 952 cu ft/s (27.0 m^{3}/s)
  - minimum: 0.11 cu ft/s (0.0031 m^{3}/s)
  - maximum: 62,500 cu ft/s (1,770 m^{3}/s)

Basin features
- Tributaries
  - left: Middle Fork Stanislaus River, Rose Creek, South Fork Stanislaus River
  - right: North Fork Stanislaus River, Angels Creek, Black Creek

The Stanislaus River is a tributary of the San Joaquin River in north-central California in the United States. The main stem of the river is 96 miles (154 km) long, and measured to its furthest headwaters it is about 150 miles (240 km) long. Originating as three forks in the high Sierra Nevada, the river flows generally southwest through the agricultural San Joaquin Valley to join the San Joaquin south of Manteca, draining parts of five California counties. The Stanislaus is known for its swift rapids and scenic canyons in the upper reaches, and is heavily used for irrigation, hydroelectricity and domestic water supply.

Originally inhabited by the Miwok group of Native Americans, the Stanislaus River was explored in the early 1800s by the Spanish, who conscripted indigenous people to work in the colonial mission and presidio systems. The river is named for Estanislao, who led a native uprising in Mexican-controlled California in 1828, but was ultimately defeated on the Stanislaus River (then known as the Río de los Laquisimes). During the California Gold Rush, the Stanislaus River was the destination of tens of thousands of gold seekers; many of them reached California via Sonora Pass, at the headwaters of the Middle Fork. Many miners and their families eventually settled along the lower Stanislaus River. The farms and ranches they established are now part of the richest agricultural region in the United States.

Early mining companies were formed to channel Stanislaus River water to the gold diggings via elaborate canal and flume systems, which directly preceded the irrigation districts formed by farmers who sought a greater degree of river control. Starting in the early 1900s, many dams were built to store and divert water; these were often paired with hydro-power systems, whose revenues covered the high cost of the water projects. In the 1970s the construction of the federal New Melones Dam incited major opposition from recreation and environmental groups (documented on the Stanislaus River Archive), who protested the loss of one of the last free-flowing stretches of the Stanislaus. Although New Melones was eventually built, its completion is considered to have marked the end of large dam building in the United States.

Water rights along the Stanislaus River are a controversial topic, with the senior rights of farmers coming into conflict with federal and state laws protecting endangered salmon and steelhead trout. The Stanislaus irrigation districts contend that diverting water for fish damages the local economy, especially in years of drought. Water managers have struggled to find a balance between competing needs, which also include groundwater recharge, flood control, and river-based recreation such as fishing and whitewater rafting.

== Course ==
The Stanislaus River headwaters consist of three forks in the high Sierra Nevada, in parts of Alpine County, Calaveras County and Tuolumne County. The Middle Fork, 46 miles (74 km) long, is the largest tributary and is sometimes considered part of the main stem. It begins in the Emigrant Wilderness of the Stanislaus National Forest about 5 miles (8.0 km) west of 9,624-foot (2,933 m) Sonora Pass. It flows northwest then west, receiving the Clark Fork below Dardanelle, before feeding Donnell Lake and Beardsley Lake, both formed by hydroelectric power dams. Below the Beardsley dam, it continues west to its confluence with the North Fork at Camp Nine, a popular swimming and fishing area near Hathaway Pines. The 31-mile-long (50 km) North Fork rises in the Carson-Iceberg Wilderness and flows in a generally southwest direction to its confluence with the Middle Fork, passing through several small hydropower dams. For most of their lengths, both forks flow in deep canyons through rugged, heavily forested terrain. The total length of the Stanislaus River, measured from its mouth to the head of Kennedy Creek in the Emigrant Wilderness, is about 150 miles (240 km).

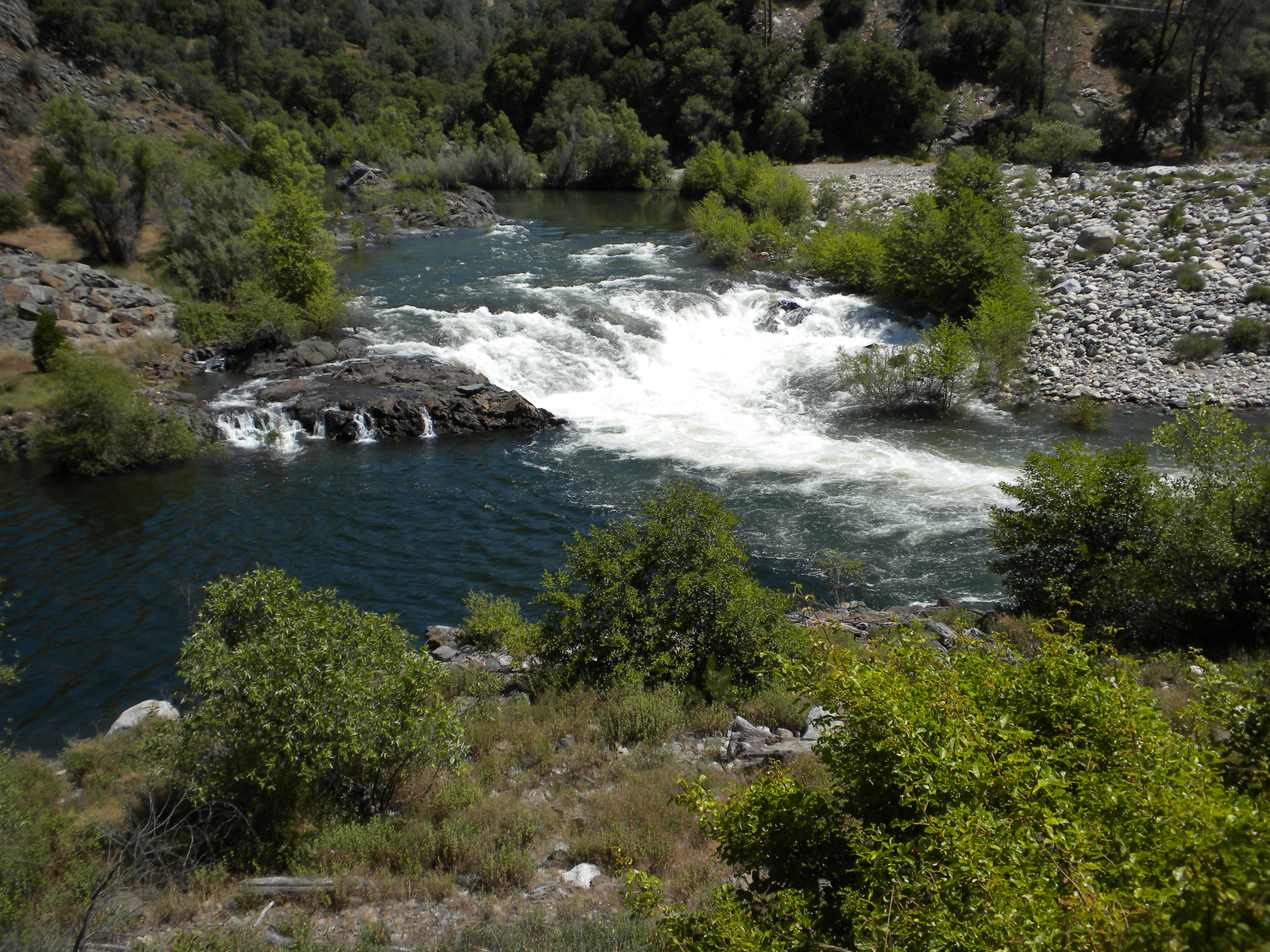
Stanislaus River at Camp Nine, near the confluence of the North and Middle Forks.

The confluence of the Middle and North Forks marks the start of the Stanislaus River proper. It flows southwest through a canyon to the 12,500-acre (5,100 ha) New Melones Lake reservoir in the Sierra Nevada foothills, forming the boundary between Calaveras County (west) and Tuolumne County (east). At the reservoir, it is joined by the smaller South Fork, which descends for 42 miles (68 km) from the Sierra Nevada to the east. Much of State Route 108 (the Sonora Pass Highway) runs parallel to the South Fork, as well as the upper part of the Middle Fork, linking a number of small communities in the upper Stanislaus basin. At the lower end of New Melones Lake is the 625-foot (191 m) tall New Melones Dam, the sixth tallest dam in the U.S., completed in 1979 for flood control, irrigation, hydropower generation and fisheries management. Below New Melones, the river flows through the smaller Tulloch Reservoir before reaching Goodwin Dam, the oldest dam on the river (completed 1913) where large volumes of water are diverted for irrigation.

Reduced considerably in size, the Stanislaus River leaves the foothills and enters agricultural Stanislaus County at the historic Gold Rush town of Knights Ferry. It is paralleled by State Route 120 as it flows west into the Central Valley, through Oakdale, the largest town on the river, and along the northern edge of the Modesto metro area. At Riverbank it begins to form the border of Stanislaus County (south) and San Joaquin County (north). At Ripon, it is crossed by Highway 99. Below Ripon the Stanislaus flows west-southwest through a low-lying area known as River Junction and past Caswell Memorial State Park. It joins the San Joaquin River at a point about 2 miles (3.2 km) northeast of Vernalis and 5 miles (8.0 km) south of Manteca, 75 miles (121 km) upstream (south) of the larger river's mouth at Suisun Bay.

=== Discharge ===
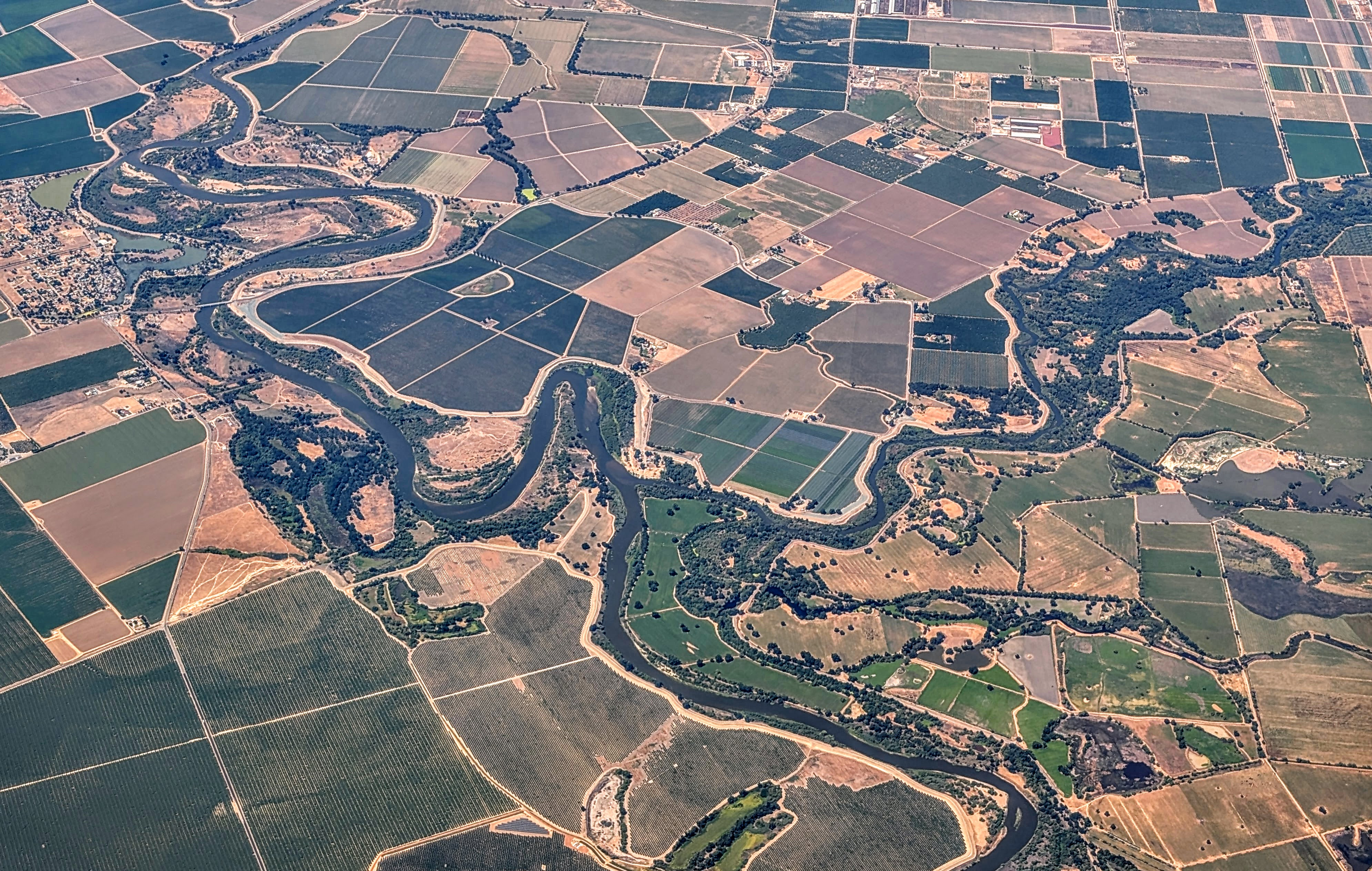
Aerial view of the confluence of the Stanislaus River (right) with the San Joaquin River (bottom and left)

The average unimpaired runoff of the Stanislaus River, as estimated at New Melones Dam, is 1,121,000 acre-feet (1.383 km^{3}) per year, or about 1,500 cubic feet per second (42 m^{3}/s). (Note: Data is the average of the 1921–2003 period.) About two-thirds of the Stanislaus River flow originates as snowmelt between the months of April and July, although its highest peak flows tend to occur during winter rains. The water flow varies widely from year to year, with a historic maximum of 2,950,000 acre-feet (3.64 km^{3}) or 4,100 cubic feet per second (120 m^{3}/s) in the 1983 water year and a minimum of 155,000 acre-feet (0.191 km^{3}) or 210 cubic feet per second (5.9 m^{3}/s) in 1977. The highest monthly flow is typically in May or June with the peak of snowmelt, and the lowest in September or October before the arrival of autumn storms. Since the late 1800s, the timing of the spring melt has shifted two to six weeks earlier due to warming temperatures in the Sierra Nevada.

Water diversions for irrigation and regulation by reservoirs have significantly lowered the mean flow of the lower Stanislaus River, smoothed out seasonal variations, and increased the dry season baseflow. The United States Geological Survey (USGS) stream gage at Ripon, 15 miles (24 km) from the mouth, recorded an annual flow of 1,008 cubic feet per second (28.5 m^{3}/s) between 1941 and 1978; after New Melones Dam was built the annual flow between 1978 and 2013 was 855 cubic feet per second (24.2 m^{3}/s). The highest peak before 1978 was 62,500 cubic feet per second (1,770 m^{3}/s) on December 24, 1955, and the lowest monthly mean was 0.635 cubic feet per second (0.0180 m^{3}/s) in August 1977. After the dam was built, the highest peak was 7,320 cubic feet per second (207 m^{3}/s) on February 28, 1997, and the lowest monthly mean was 139.1 cubic feet per second (3.94 m^{3}/s) in September 2016.

== Watershed ==
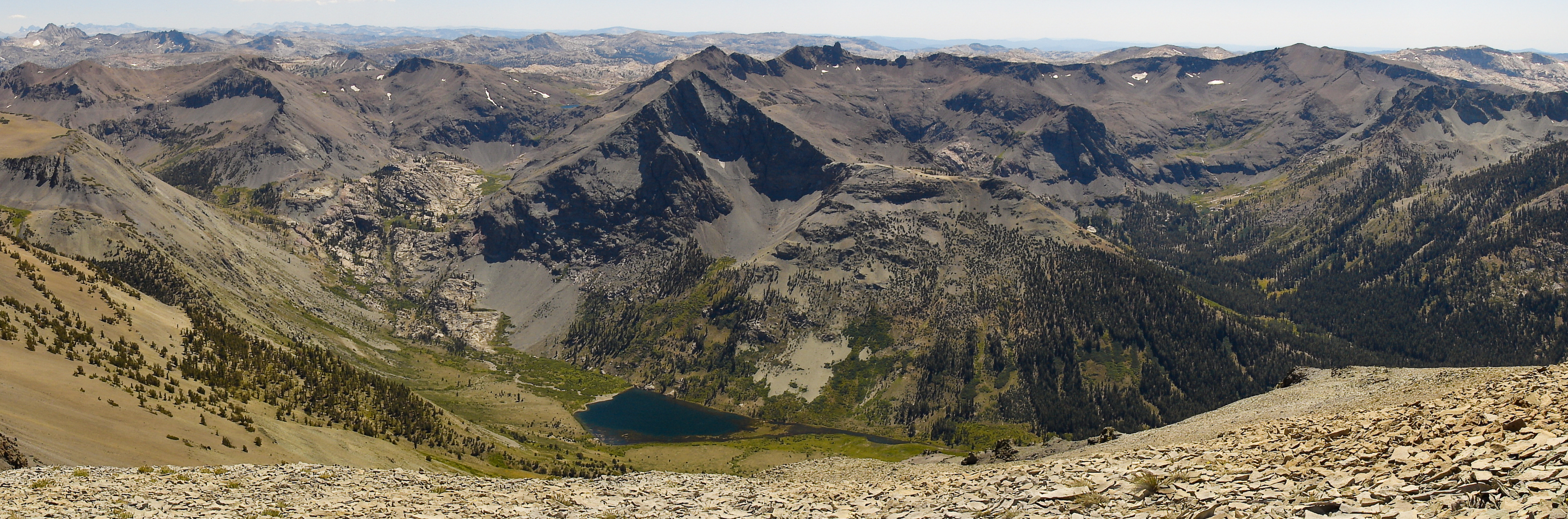
Kennedy Lake, near the headwaters of the Middle Fork, seen from Leavitt Peak (11,525 ft (3,513 m)) in the Emigrant Wilderness

The Stanislaus River watershed drains 1,075 square miles (2,780 km^{2}) and is divided into two distinct sections – the mountainous upper watershed, where the vast majority of its flow originates, and the narrow, heavily developed lower watershed where it flows across the San Joaquin Valley. Goodwin Dam has traditionally been considered the dividing line between the upper and lower watersheds. Elevations in the watershed range from less than 15 feet (4.6 m) at the confluence with the San Joaquin River to over 10,000 feet (3,000 m) in the high Sierra Nevada. Annual precipitation varies from 20 inches (510 mm) in the valley regions to 50 inches (1,300 mm) or more at higher elevations; at elevations above 5,000 feet (1,500 m) most precipitation falls as snow.

The upper watershed comprises 90 percent of the total area and supplies a commensurate proportion of the river flow. Stretching from the foothill to alpine regions of the Sierra Nevada, it consists of rugged narrow canyons and ridges with an average local relief of 2,000 feet (610 m) or more from river to rim. Much of the watershed is at high elevation, with 40 percent of the total area above winter snow line. The average precipitation in the upper basin as a whole is 46.8 inches (1,190 mm). The vast majority of the upper basin is either undeveloped or commercial timber land, with very small areas of agriculture, ranching, and mountain meadows above the tree line. The higher elevations are mostly federal Forest Service land and designated wilderness, while the middle elevations are a patchwork of state, federal and privately owned land. Much of the private timber land has been subject to checker-board clearcutting, which has greatly fragmented wildlife habitat.

The lower Stanislaus River watershed comprises only about one-tenth of the total area and is used mainly for agriculture (61 percent) and urban development (34 percent), with minimal open space. Major communities near the lower river include (from upstream to downstream) Copperopolis, Knights Ferry, East Oakdale, Oakdale, Riverbank, Escalon, Salida and Ripon. The 60-mile (97 km) long lower river has been modified extensively not only by water diversions, but by channelization and levee construction to drain wetlands and prevent floods. Most of the natural floodplain no longer exists, and about half of the former riparian habitat has been lost. The river bed has been subjected to extensive gravel mining (mostly for construction purposes), with an estimated 6.3 million yd^{3} (4.8 million m^{3}) extracted between 1939 and 1999.

== Geology ==
The Stanislaus River is believed to have originally formed sometime during the Miocene period, about 23 million years ago, flowing down from an ancient mountain range in the current location of the Sierra Nevada that has since eroded away. Huge lava flows moved down the ancestral canyon, filling it with volcanic rock and sediment. About 9 million years ago during the Pliocene, the most recent period of orogeny (uplift) occurred, tilting the predominantly granitic Sierra Nevada batholith to form a regional slope to the west. As the mountains rose the Stanislaus River established its modern course, carrying away the volcanic material that had filled the ancestral canyon. This orogeny coincided with a second period of volcanic activity, during which lava flows displaced the Stanislaus River course several times where it flows through the foothills, causing it to carve new canyons through underlying sedimentary rock. The lava flows are today known as the Stanislaus Formation, and are most visible as the caprock layer of the distinctive "table mountains" around present day New Melones Lake.

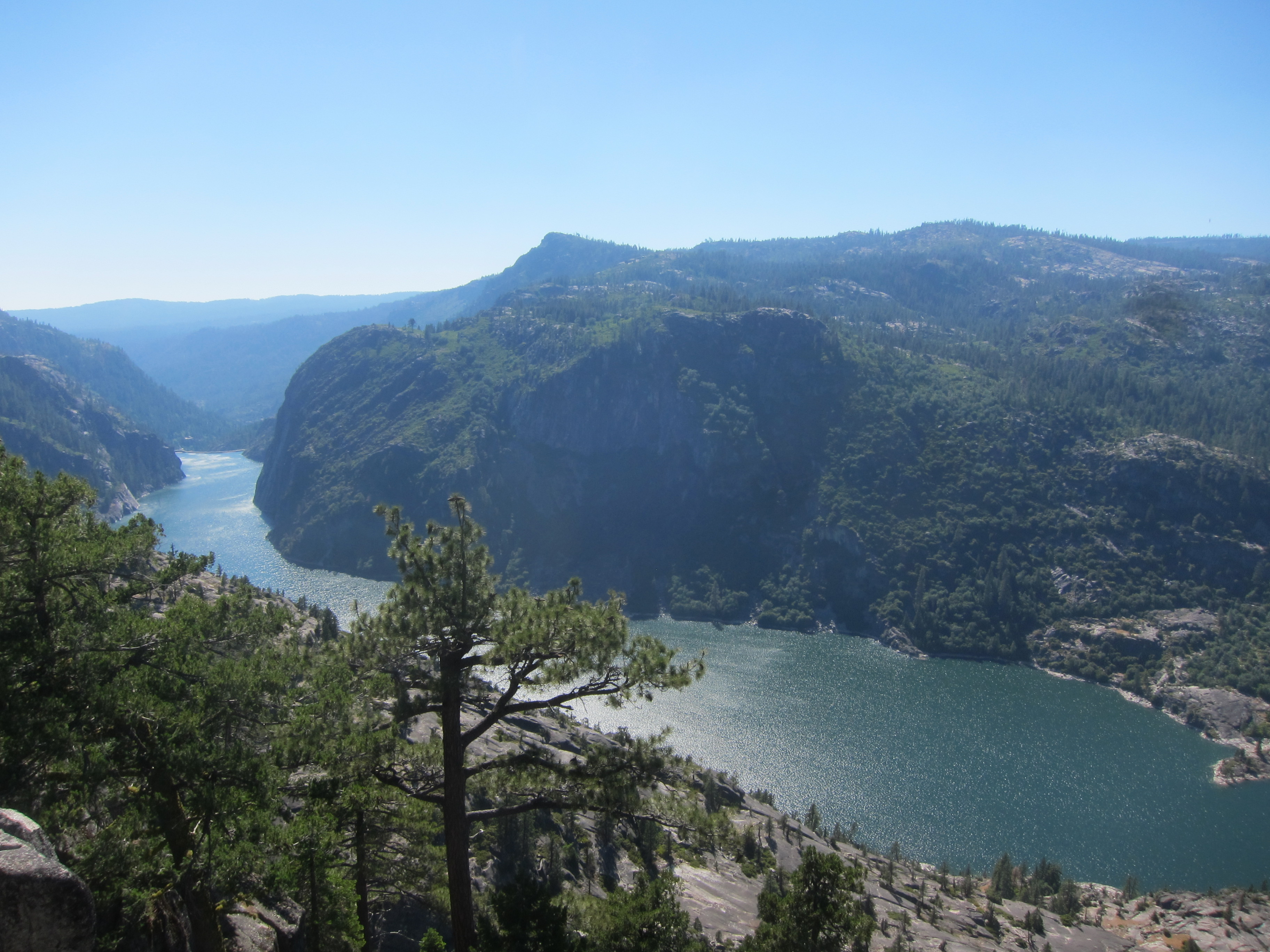
The Stanislaus River canyon at the Dardanelles area, where Donnells Lake reservoir is today, was formed by glaciation during the Ice Ages.

As both uplift and erosion continued, the Stanislaus River gradually carved the rugged canyons it flows through today, and contributed to the vast alluvial deposits that make up the flat floor of the Central Valley. Some of these fluvial sediments, originating from gold-bearing veins in the granite batholith, were deposited as placer gold in the river bed to be discovered later during the California Gold Rush. The lower course of the river is geologically young, dating to no earlier than the Holocene; the river has continually cut new channels through its sediments and filled in older ones, creating a sequence of river terraces.

Most of the erosion that shaped the modern Stanislaus River basin is believed to have occurred during glacial and interglacial periods in the Pleistocene, starting about 1 million years ago. During the ice ages California had a much wetter climate; average river flows in the past may have been as high as what is considered "flood stage" today. The climate was also cold enough to support large glaciers in the Sierra Nevada at elevations above 4,000 feet (1,200 m). These glaciers carved large U-shaped valleys in the high elevations, and supplied vast volumes of meltwater which accelerated erosion along the foothill canyons of the Stanislaus River. During the last glacial period the main Stanislaus glacier was up to 30 miles (48 km) long; during previous ice ages it may have extended as far as 45 miles (72 km). Although glaciation did not have as dramatic an impact on the Stanislaus River watershed as it did further south (such as at Hetch Hetchy and Yosemite), many major features of the upper Stanislaus were sculpted by ice, such as the Clark Fork valley and the Middle Fork valley at Donnell Lake.

== History ==
=== First peoples ===
Humans first arrived in the Sierra Nevada of present-day California more than 10,000 years ago. The remains of a Native American dwelling near the Stanislaus River, an oval-shaped site about 12 feet (3.7 m) in width, is estimated by archaeologists to be about 9,500 years old and is the oldest known constructed dwelling (though not archaeological site) in North America. For at least several centuries before the arrival of Spanish explorers, the Stanislaus River basin was inhabited by the Central Sierra Miwok speakers of the Plains and Sierra Miwok. The Miwok had a predominantly hunter-gatherer lifestyle, although they also practiced some primitive agriculture and controlled burning of grassland to enhance their hunting grounds. The Miwok had their main settlements in the lower elevations of foothills and the Central Valley, where they spent winters; during the summer they traveled into the Sierra Nevada via the Stanislaus and other nearby rivers to harvest vegetable foods in high elevations and escape the summer heat.

Native Americans of the region did not form one large nation; rather, they lived in "tribelets" of between 100 and 500 people. One group associated with the Stanislaus River was the "Walla" or "Wal-li" (a native term meaning "digger" or "toward the earth") who lived in the hills between the Stanislaus and Tuolumne Rivers. The "Walla Walla" term was also associated with other peoples in the region, because of their practice of digging in the earth for edible roots. With its annual floods, the Stanislaus River supported a wide area of perennial and seasonal wetlands, including the extensive tule marshes (tulares) in the area of the San Joaquin River, which were host to an abundance of game animals, birds and migratory fish that in turn supported particularly high Native American populations. Fur trapper James Warner, who visited the area in 1832, wrote of "Indian villages above the mouth [of the Stanislaus], as also at or near the junction with the San Joaquin" and described the region as thus: "On no part of the Continent over which I had been or since have traveled was so numerous an Indian population subsisting upon the natural products of the soil and waters as in the San Joaquin Valley."

=== European conquest and colonization ===
Although the Spanish Empire claimed California in the 1770s, much of the Central Valley, then a huge expanse of swamps and rivers, remained unexplored by the Spanish for several decades thereafter. The first Spaniards to encounter the Stanislaus River were Gabriel Moraga's 1806 expedition, who named the river Rio de Nuestra Señora de Guadalupe, "River of Our Lady of Guadalupe". Fray Pedro Muñoz, traveling with Moraga, wrote of "immense quantities of wild grape-vines" along the Guadalupe River. In 1808, Moraga returned to the area to search for suitable mission sites, but was not successful. The river later became known as Río de los Laquisimes, possibly derived from a Native American name for the river or surrounding area. Although the Spanish ultimately did not establish any missions in the Central Valley, they forcibly took thousands of Native Americans to missions along the coast, where they were converted to Catholicism and subjected to agricultural labor. Mission San José was the destination of many Miwok from the Laquisimes River area.

American explorers also visited the Laquisimes River country starting in the 1820s, in search of beaver and otter pelts. The fur trappers included renowned mountain men Jedediah Smith, William Henry Ashley, and Ewing Young, who explored the area in the period between 1825 and 1830. In the spring of 1827 Smith's party camped on the Laquisimes River near present-day Oakdale, having reportedly cached 1,500 pounds (680 kg) of beaver pelts nearby. Smith called the river the "Appelamminy". On May 20, Smith and two other men set out along the Laquisimes to attempt a crossing of the Sierra Nevada. About a week later, after having made their way up the rugged North Fork canyon, they crossed Ebbetts Pass, becoming the first people of European descent to cross the Sierra.

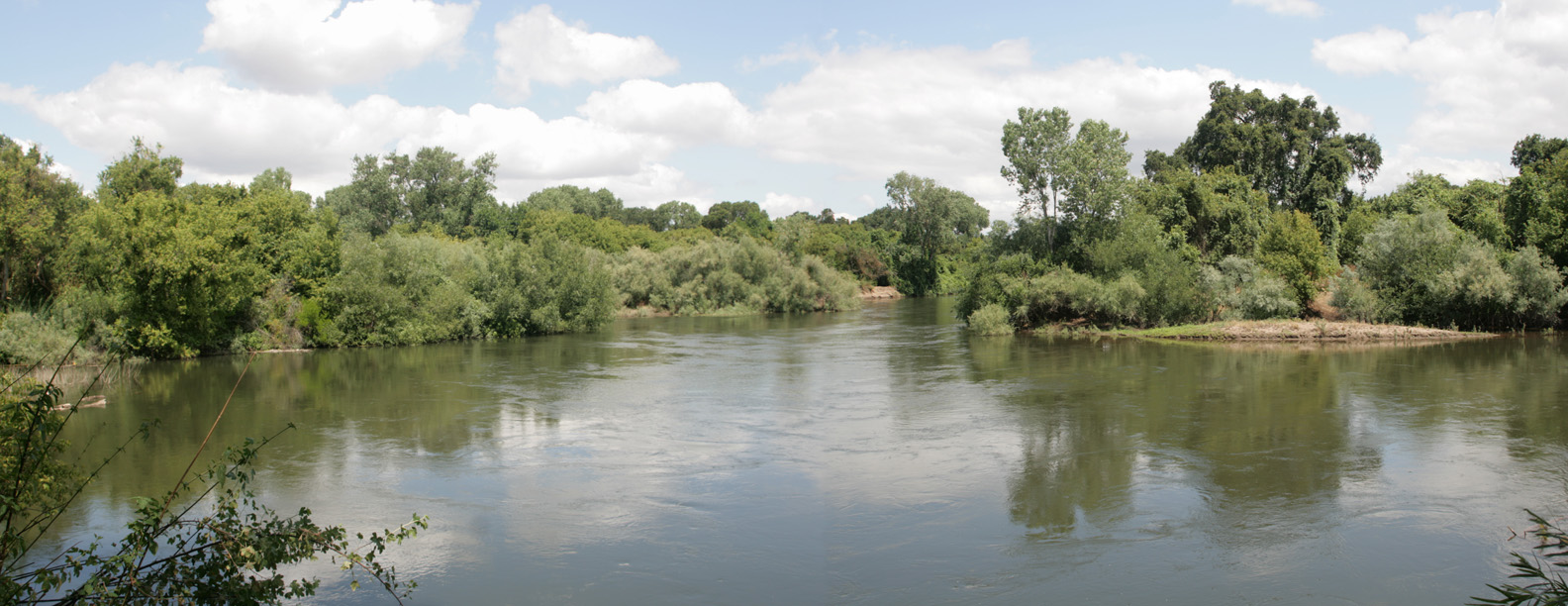
Stanislaus River at Caswell Memorial State Park, where Estanislao is thought to have fought Vallejo's troops

There was considerable native resistance to the Spanish mission program, which continued after Mexico gained independence from Spain in 1821. Most escaped Native Americans fled to the Central Valley, which was difficult for heavily armed Spanish soldiers to traverse due to its swampy terrain. Around November 1828, a Yokuts man named Estanislao (christened after Saint Stanislaus; his native name is believed to have been Cucunichi) led a revolt at Mission San Jose and fled to the Laquisimes River country with many other natives. There he raised an army of Yokuts, Miwok and Chumash, who raided the missions and large ranchos, stealing horses and cattle and freeing Native American laborers. The Mexican army, led by Mariano Vallejo, moved to crush the resistance, but was initially defeated by natives on the Laquisimes River, in a place believed to be near present-day Caswell Memorial State Park.

After the initial defeat, Vallejo returned with a force of "107 soldiers, some citizens, and at least fifty mission Indian militiamen" armed with muskets and cannon, but again fought to a draw. Vallejo set fire to vegetation along the river banks to draw out the opposition, but Estanislao and his fighters escaped, and continued to raid Mexican settlements through that winter. According to popular legend, Estanislao would carve an "S" in a tree after his attacks, and was an inspiration for the fictional character Zorro. In June 1829 Vallejo finally defeated him on the Laquisimes River. The vanquished Estanislao ultimately returned to Mission San Jose, where he confessed his sins and was pardoned by the Mexican government. However, the Mexicans never again attempted to control the eastern part of the San Joaquin Valley, and the Laquisimes River was renamed the Stanislaus in Estanislao's honor.

An unintended, but destructive consequence of European arrival was the introduction of foreign diseases. It is believed that a Hudson's Bay Company trapping expedition inadvertently introduced malaria into the Central Valley in 1832. Over the next few years successive waves of malaria swept this region, killing thousands of Native Americans in the Central Valley who had no natural immunity to European diseases. The spread of disease was exacerbated by both the massive numbers of mosquitoes in the Central Valley wetlands, and the densely packed Native American villages. As many as 80 percent of the Plains Miwok who had survived Spanish colonization died in the consequent epidemic. A smallpox epidemic struck around 1837, claiming even more lives, including that of Estanislao, who died at Mission San Jose in June 1838.

=== American settlement and the Gold Rush ===
During the 1840s, many American settlers emigrated to the Central Valley of what was still Mexican-controlled California, seeking to claim the area's fertile farmland. The first major American settlement along the Stanislaus River was founded in January 1847 by about 30 Mormon colonists under the direction of Samuel Brannan. Stanislaus City, alternately called "Mormon Ranch" or "New Hope", was established on the north bank of the river not far from its confluence with the San Joaquin. The settlers constructed a sawmill and began to plant the area in wheat and vegetables. Brannan envisioned Stanislaus City as the center of the LDS church in California, eventually to attract thousands of Mormon emigrants. However, the settlement did not grow significantly, ultimately dissolving the next year. At least one factor in its decline was a massive flood that winter; William Stout, one of the town's founders, wrote that the Stanislaus was "three miles wide" in January 1848.

The influence of American settlement ultimately led to the Bear Flag Revolt, after which California became part of the United States in 1848. In the same year, gold was discovered on the American River, starting the California Gold Rush. Although gold mining was initially concentrated on the American and other rivers to the north, attention was drawn to the Stanislaus in August 1848 after a Native American party under Charles Weber discovered gold on the river. The entire mining camp of Dry Diggings (near today's Placerville), about 200 men in all, packed up and headed south to the Stanislaus River, and as news spread throughout the Gold Country, hundreds more arrived. Many miners traveling from the eastern United States arrived in California via the Sonora Pass, at the headwaters of the Middle Fork of the Stanislaus River. By 1849, as many as 10,000 miners had reached the Stanislaus River country.

The Stanislaus was as productive a gold-bearing stream as any in California; in the early days of the Gold Rush it was known as the "Southern Mines" because it was at the time the southernmost extent of the primary gold diggings. In 1848 William R. Ryan wrote that the mining camps along the Stanislaus River were "all of the poorest and most wretched description. Miners expected to profit within a short time and then leave these primitive conditions and return to their homes. There were numerous tents, good, bad, and indifferent, stores and gambling booths, shanties and open encampments; and miners busy everywhere." Initially, miners worked individual placer claims, but as the easily accessed gold played out, they teamed up to build extensive dam, ditch and flume systems that could more efficiently wash gold out of sediment, as well as supply water to gold-bearing areas without a water source and provide water for irrigation. These represent some of the earliest water rights claims along the Stanislaus River. Many mining camps were established on the Stanislaus River including Tuttletown, also known as the "Mormon Camp" (some of the first prospectors came from the unsuccessful colony at Stanislaus City) and Melones, named for gold that was "so coarse" that it reminded the miners of "melon seeds".

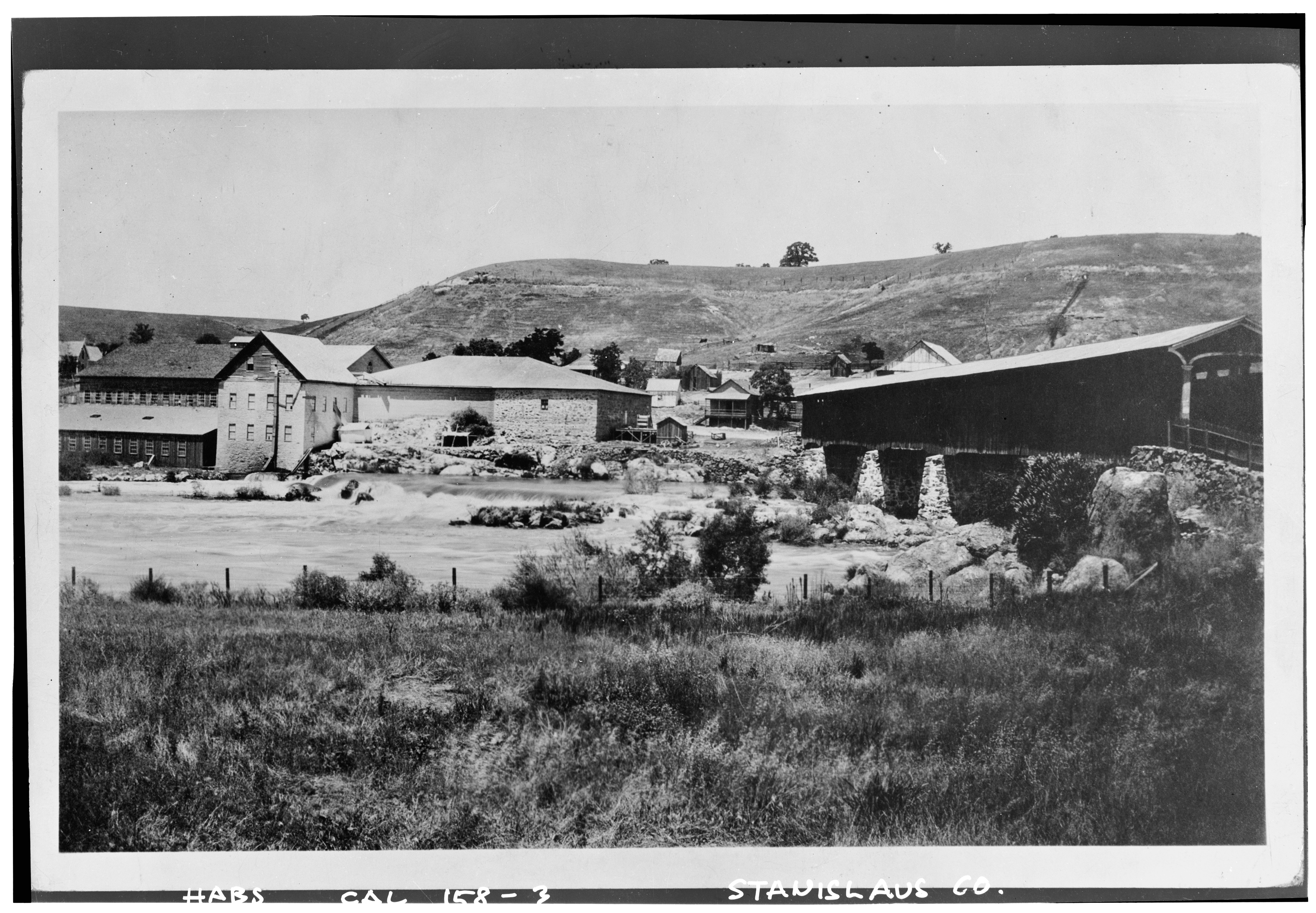
Knights Ferry covered bridge and the old Tulloch Mill (date unknown)

In 1849 William Knight, a hunter and trapper, established a ferry and trading post on the Stanislaus River, to serve the thousands of miners headed to the diggings at Sonora and other mining camps. Knight had previously accompanied John C. Frémont on expeditions in the 1840s, and "foresaw that Knights Ferry [via the Stanislaus] was Nature's pathway through the mountains." This was one of many ferries that operated on the Stanislaus River in the following decades, including others at Byrne's Ferry (later replaced by a covered bridge) and Taylor's Ferry near Oakdale. Although Knight was killed later that year (reportedly in a gunfight), the settlement had already become the principal supply point of the region, with daily stage coach service to Stockton, and was named Knights Ferry in his honor. After Knight's death, Lewis Dent took over the ferry operations. In 1854 the ferry was replaced by a wooden covered bridge; within the next few years Knights Ferry also became the site of a hotel, court house, flour mill and the Tuolumne County jail. The settlement was largely destroyed during the Great Flood of 1862, which washed away the bridge, but it and the rest of the town were soon rebuilt. Knights Ferry became the seat of Stanislaus County that same year, until Modesto took its position in 1872.

In 1851 the Tuolumne County Water Company was organized to divert water from the South Fork of the Stanislaus River; by 1853 it consisted of 80 miles (130 km) of canals serving as many as 1,800 miners and their claims. Water was supplied as far as Columbia and Sonora, 60 miles (97 km) to the south. The Columbia and Stanislaus River Company was formed in 1854 on the main stem of the Stanislaus River, in competition to the high rates charged by Tuolumne. They built a ditch at a cost of $1.5 million (five times the original estimate), went bankrupt shortly after, and was ultimately sold to the Tuolumne County Water Company at a small fraction of the original cost. Massive amounts of lumber were required to build the mining flumes and aqueducts, leading to widespread deforestation in the lower elevations of the Stanislaus basin. These early waterworks were crudely built and often failed, sometimes with tragic results. In 1857, a dam on the South Fork of the Stanislaus River collapsed, flooding the mining camps of Pine Log and Italian Bar, killing sixteen people. Only a few years later, most of the mining claims and infrastructure were destroyed by the 1862 flood.

=== Late 19th and early 20th century ===
After the end of the Gold Rush, very few people visited the rugged Stanislaus River country above the Sierra foothills before the turn of the 20th century. Knights Ferry declined in influence as many of the departing miners settled around the farming community of Oakdale, several miles downstream. Historic records show that the majority of ranches and homesteads in the Stanislaus River area were established between the 1850s and 1890s by former gold seekers. The Southern Pacific Railroad arrived in Oakdale in 1872, bypassing Knights Ferry and drawing the valley's population to the former town; the Knights Ferry flour mill moved its operations to Oakdale in 1881. In 1895 Charles Tulloch acquired water rights to an old mining ditch near Knights Ferry and incorporated the Stanislaus Milling and Power Company, later the Stanislaus Water & Power Company. Tulloch converted the old flour mill into the first hydroelectric plant on the Stanislaus River.

During the late 1800s and early 1900s, development slowly moved higher into the Stanislaus watershed in large part due to improvement of the Sonora Pass Highway. The former wagon trail up the Stanislaus canyon had operated since 1864 as a toll road (Sonora-Mono Toll Road) and was heavily traveled during the 1870s during the gold strike in Bodie. A number of trading posts and rest stops operated on both sides of Sonora Pass including Sugar Pine, Strawberry, Baker's Station, Leavitt's Station and Big Meadows. In the following decades, travel over Sonora Pass declined heavily. The road became part of the state highway system in 1901 and was improved in 1906 to service the construction of Relief Dam in the headwaters of the Stanislaus River. Today, most of the road has been replaced by the newer alignment of Highway 108.

Tourists began to visit the high country with the advent of the automobile in the early 20th century and a number of camps and resorts were established along the river including the Douglas Resort (Douglas Station) in 1920, and the Dardanelle Resort in 1923 at the confluence of Eagle Creek and the Stanislaus River. The Dardanelle resort remained operational until 2018. The new Dardanelle Bridge was built in 1933 to replace an older span constructed in 1864 and provide better access to the tourist areas. This bridge was believed to be the last known timber scissors truss in the United States. Both the resort and the bridge were destroyed in the 2018 Donnell Fire. There was also extensive logging done throughout the foothill area of the Stanislaus watershed, and several narrow gauge railroads penetrated into the foothills, including the Sugar Pine Railway or Strawberry Branch, which followed the Stanislaus' South Fork. Another line, the Sierra Railway's Angels Branch, connected Jamestown to Angels Camp and required a series of switchbacks to traverse the deep canyon of the Stanislaus River, an area now flooded by New Melones Lake.

The upper Stanislaus watershed was also used as a filming location. The Sierra Railway was a popular filming location starting around 1917 due to the "rugged countryside and quaint, ancient trains." During the 1930s scenes for Robin Hood of El Dorado were filmed near the old Douglas Resort. In the 1970s several episodes of the Little House on the Prairie TV series were filmed at Donnell Vista, near Donnell Lake.

== River development ==
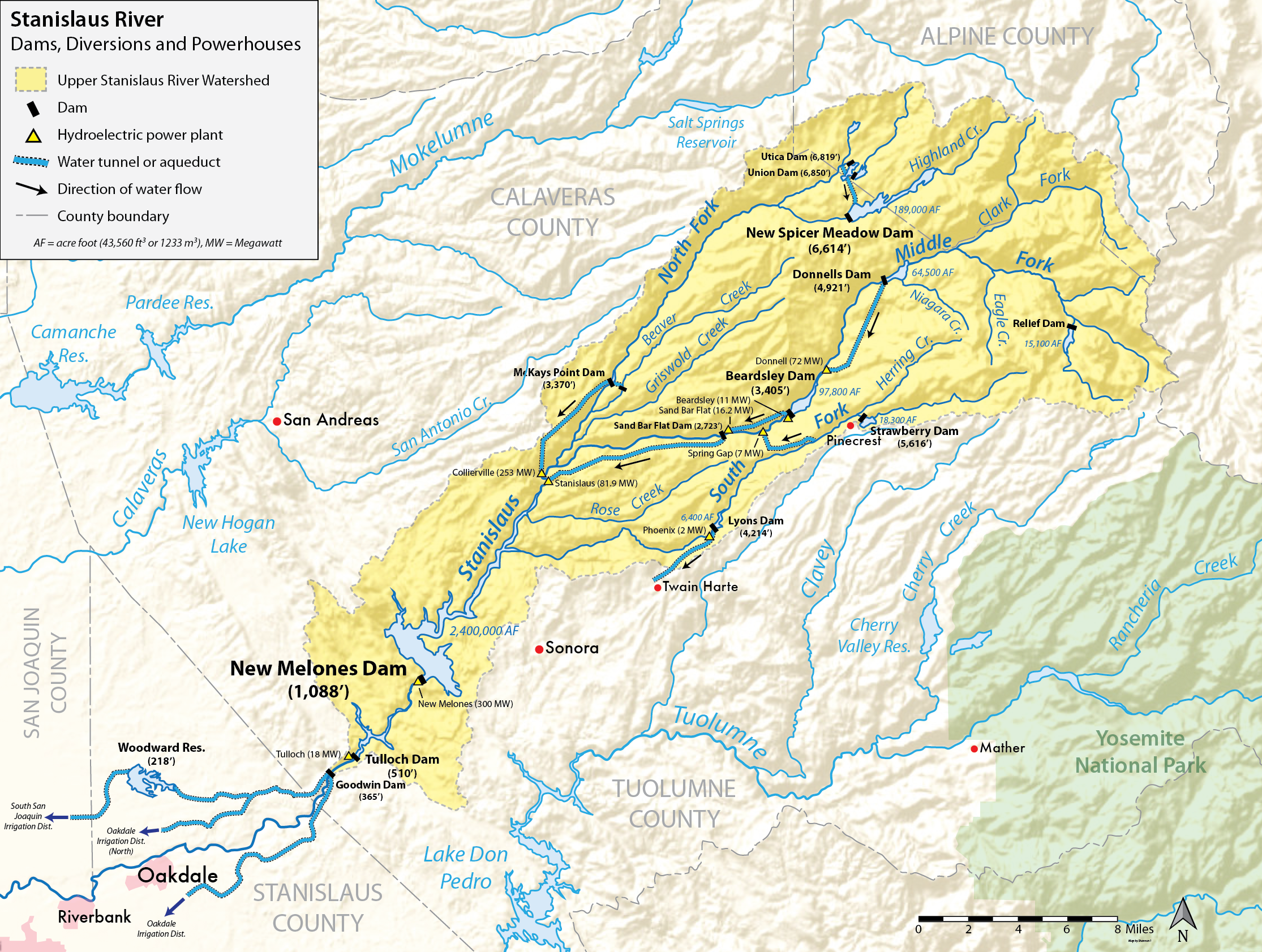
Map showing major dams, diversions and power plants in the Stanislaus River basin.

The Stanislaus River is one of the most heavily dammed and diverted rivers in California, relative to its size. There are a total of 28 major dams on the Stanislaus River and its tributaries with a combined storage capacity of more than 2.8 million acre-feet (3.5 km^{3}). The river irrigates some 213,000 acres (86,000 ha) of productive farmland, most of it in Stanislaus and San Joaquin Counties. Fourteen hydroelectric plants on the river and its tributaries are operated by various local irrigation districts, private power companies and federal agencies. The river provides domestic and industrial water supply to nearby cities, including Manteca, Lathrop, Escalon and Tracy. Stanislaus River water flows are also a vital resource to maintain fisheries and recreational activities, dilute pollution, recharge groundwater, and control saline intrusion in the Sacramento–San Joaquin River Delta.

The river is extremely over-allocated, meaning that claims to its water far exceed supply. There are more than 160 separate water rights to the Stanislaus River totaling 19.7 million acre-feet (24.3 km^{3}), compared to the river's normal flow of 1.1 million acre-feet (1.4 km^{3}). About 3.9 million acre-feet (4.8 km^{3}) are considered "consumptive use" water rights, meaning that the water would not be returned to the river. Most of the other rights are for "non-consumptive" uses such as hydropower generation. Not all of these rights are in use today (many belong to defunct mining or power companies). Water rights on the Stanislaus River have traditionally been, and are still de jure subject to the prior appropriation method, where the oldest rights-holders get first priority. However, after the completion of New Melones Dam in 1979, and especially due to drought in recent years, federal and local agencies have often been forced to compromise in order to divide limited Stanislaus River supplies between the many demands.

=== Irrigation ===
Farmers have been using water from the Stanislaus River since the Gold Rush, when water was diverted to small farms and vegetable gardens on homesteads. As the number of claimants on the river grew, farmers recognized they had to work together in order to effectively distribute the water. One of the first irrigation cooperatives formed on the Stanislaus River was formed by the Tulloch family in 1858, who built a diversion dam to supply farms in the area around Knight's Ferry. The Stanislaus and San Joaquin Water Company, formed by H.W. Cowell and N.S. Harrold in 1895, improved on this system, building 47 miles (76 km) of canals along the north side of the Stanislaus River and supplying water to some 3,000 acres (1,200 ha) in Manteca and Oakdale.

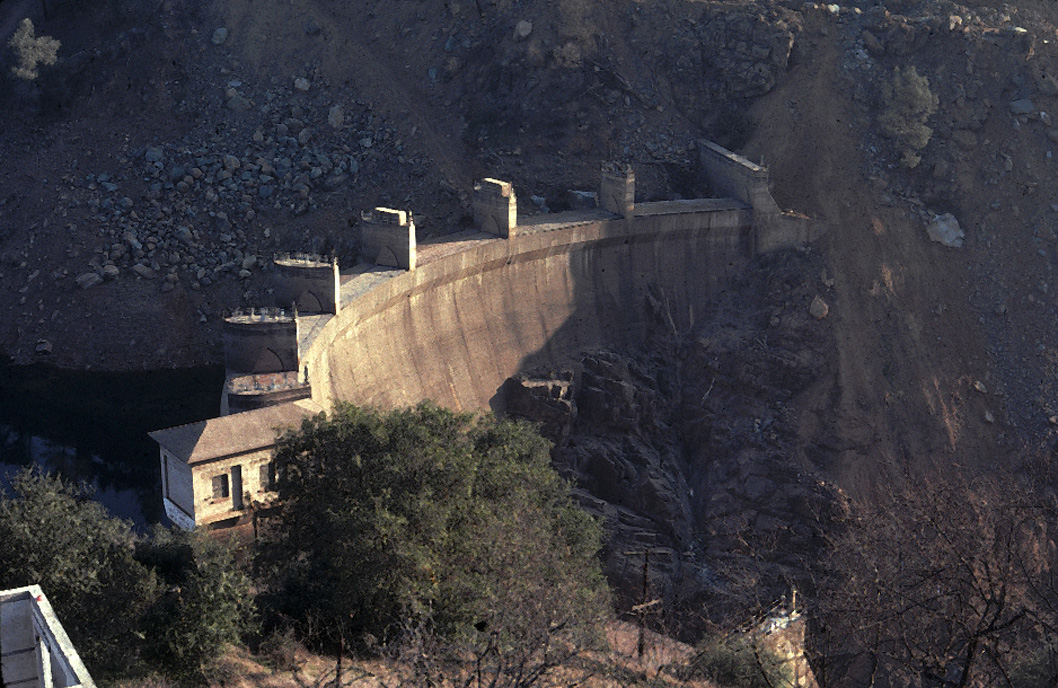
The 1926 Melones Dam

The Oakdale Irrigation District (OID) and South San Joaquin Irrigation District (SSJID) were created in 1909 under the Wright Act, and together own the oldest water rights on the Stanislaus River. The OID service area is located on both sides of the Stanislaus River in Stanislaus County, and the SSJID is located on the north side of the river, in Stanislaus and San Joaquin Counties. Today, the districts irrigate a combined 120,000 acres (49,000 ha), with the major crops being grapes, almonds, corn, rice, fruit orchards and pasture. Today, this area is one of the most productive agricultural regions of the United States; in 2014, Stanislaus and San Joaquin Counties produced a combined $7.6 billion of crops.

Shortly after their formation, the districts issued $1.9 million in revenue bonds to finance the dam and canal infrastructure that would supply the land. In 1913 the districts built Goodwin Dam, about 2.5 miles (4.0 km) upstream of Knights Ferry, to divert water into their respective canals. They filed claims for 600,000 acre-feet (0.74 km^{3}) of Stanislaus River water, divided evenly between the two districts. In the early years, maintaining a sufficient water supply in the summer was nearly impossible, because the Sierra snowpack usually melts out by mid-June. Agriculture relied heavily on wells in the late summer when the river was low, and this could only support about 20,000 acres (8,100 ha) of crops. The lower Stanislaus River was often completely dry in the summertime due to water diversions. The irrigation districts desperately needed water storage for the dry season, and a number of small off-stream reservoirs were built, including Woodward Reservoir in 1916, though their benefit was limited at best. In 1925 the districts issued $2.2 million of bonds to build a storage dam on the Stanislaus River. The original Melones Dam, completed 1926, was a 211-foot (64 m) tall concrete arch structure capable of storing 112,500 acre-feet (0.1388 km^{3}) of water, enough to irrigate 144,000 acres (58,000 ha) of land for a single season but too small to provide carry-over storage for drought years.

A severe drought in the 1930s demonstrated that Melones Reservoir, by itself, was too small to meet all the irrigation demands. The OID sank 25 deep wells between 1931 and 1938 to make up for the shortfall, but this depleted the local groundwater at an unsustainable rate. SSJID was better supplied throughout the 1930s, in part due to less water-intensive crops, but started experiencing shortages by the early 1940s. In 1948 the districts joined to increase water storage on the Stanislaus River by constructing the Tri-Dam Project, consisting of Donnells and Beardsley dams on the Middle Fork, Tulloch Dam between the existing Goodwin and Melones dams, and Columbia Dam below the junction of the Middle and North Forks (this fourth site was later dropped from the proposal). The districts had also contemplated building a bigger 1.1 million acre foot (1.4 km^{3}) reservoir to replace the Melones Reservoir, but this project also never made it past the drawing board.

The $52 million Tri-Dam project would mainly be financed by leasing hydro-power rights at these dams to Pacific Gas & Electric Company (PG&E) for a 50-year period. Like Melones, the Tri-Dam Project would be jointly owned and operated by the two districts. After almost ten years of construction, Donnells and Beardsley Dam were completed in 1957, and Tulloch Dam completed in 1958. The three dams combined could store 230,400 acre-feet (0.2842 km^{3}), more than tripling the water storage capacity on the Stanislaus River, and increased the reliable annual supply to almost 570,000 acre-feet (0.70 km^{3}). These were the last major water projects completed on the river until 1972, when work began on the federal New Melones Dam which would replace and submerge the original 1926 Melones Dam.

=== New Melones Project ===
Starting in the 1940s, the federal government had also sought to build a high dam at the Melones site. The Flood Control Act of 1944 authorized the U.S. Army Corps of Engineers to build a flood control structure with about four times the capacity of the irrigation districts' dam. However, they were unable to provide a sound economic justification for the project on flood control alone. In the 1950s, the U.S. Bureau of Reclamation proposed a much larger dam with a capacity of 2.4 million acre-feet (3.0 km^{3}), which would capture most of the extra floodwaters that the existing small irrigation dams could not hold. It would be a multi-purpose unit of the Central Valley Project, providing irrigation, flood control, hydropower and fishery flows. Locals initially criticized the project, saying that it was too big, a waste of federal money, and the reservoir would never fill. There was also concern that the Bureau of Reclamation was attempting a "water grab" that would take the extra water to meet obligations outside the Stanislaus River Basin. However, after the Christmas flood of 1964 caused massive destruction along the Stanislaus River, New Melones gained political support. After federal funding was approved, construction started in 1966.

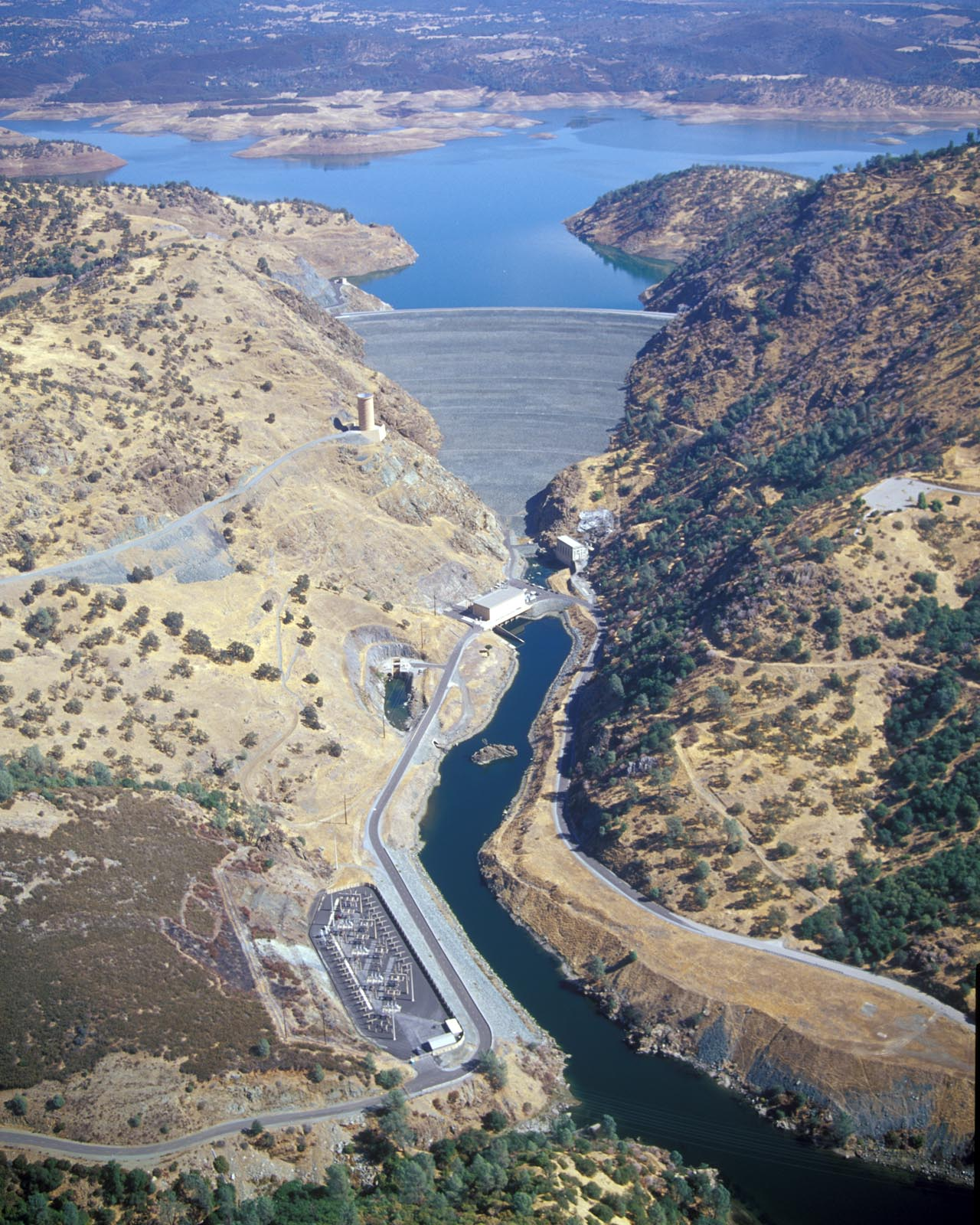
The Stanislaus River below New Melones Dam

The New Melones project is well known for a legal battle between environmentalists, the state of California and the federal government which began in the 1970s as recreational whitewater rafting exploded in popularity. The Stanislaus was for a time the most popular run in the western United States, and was valued for the spectacular scenery along its rugged limestone canyons. Friends of the River was formed to push a statewide ballot measure, Prop 17, that would have designated the Stanislaus as a National Wild and Scenic River and forestalled the construction of New Melones. Prop 17 was defeated by a narrow margin of voters, in part due to heavy lobbying by water agencies. Afterwards, dam opponents focused on limiting the level of the new reservoir, even as dam construction was completed in 1978. In May 1979 environmental activist Mark Dubois chained himself to a boulder in the Stanislaus Canyon, forcing federal authorities to either stop filling the lake or drown him.

As a result, the state of California under Governor Jerry Brown (who also objected to New Melones on economic grounds) issued a temporary limit in November 1980 to keep the lake level below Parrott's Ferry Bridge, which marked the lower end of the Stanislaus whitewater. The California Department of Water Resources questioned whether the extra irrigation water was even necessary, and studies by the state Department of Fish and Wildlife suggested that the dam would harm the fisheries it was intended to protect. The state and environmentalists agreed to compromise the lake level at 26 percent of its design capacity, which hydrological studies determined was the optimal volume for fulfilling demands along the Stanislaus without losing too much water to evaporation and flood releases.

The federal government and some agencies which stood to benefit from the new dam derided the decision, arguing that to not fill the already completed dam was a waste of money and water. Heated debate continued until the 1982–1983 water years, California's wettest back-to-back seasons on record, when massive storms and snowpack swelled the river and filled the reservoir in under two years, a process originally projected to take eight years. In June 1983 New Melones Lake hit its highest level on record, nearly flowing over the emergency spillway. The floods demonstrated the value of the dam in preventing $50 million of property damage and capturing a huge volume of water that would otherwise have flowed into the ocean, prompting the state of California to lift the temporary limit.

Since then, New Melones has struggled to fulfill its obligations to downstream water users; during droughts, the irrigation districts and the federal government have frequently fought over its water. One of the conditions of New Melones' construction was that the OID and SSJID be guaranteed the 600,000 acre-feet (0.74 km^{3}) of water rights they had held since 1913. However, the Bureau of Reclamation has sometimes shorted the irrigation districts in favor of releasing water to support the ailing salmon and steelhead fisheries, which is required by federal law such as the 1972 Endangered Species Act and the 1991 Central Valley Project Improvement Act. In addition, the Melones Project is obligated to provide water to the Stockton East Water District, which irrigates an additional 51,000 acres (21,000 ha) north of the Stanislaus River, and the Central San Joaquin Water Conservation District which irrigates 48,000 acres (19,000 ha). In the 21st century, which has been subject to extended drought, federal and local water agencies continue to seek a balanced solution.

New Melones was a significant milestone in the history of American dam building. The battle over the Stanislaus River greatly increased the political influence of the river conservation movement, and public awareness of the environmental impact of large dam projects. Since New Melones' completion in 1978, "no structure as large or as significant has since been built on an American river. And since this date, virtually no structural modification to a river in this country has gone unopposed."

=== Hydroelectricity ===
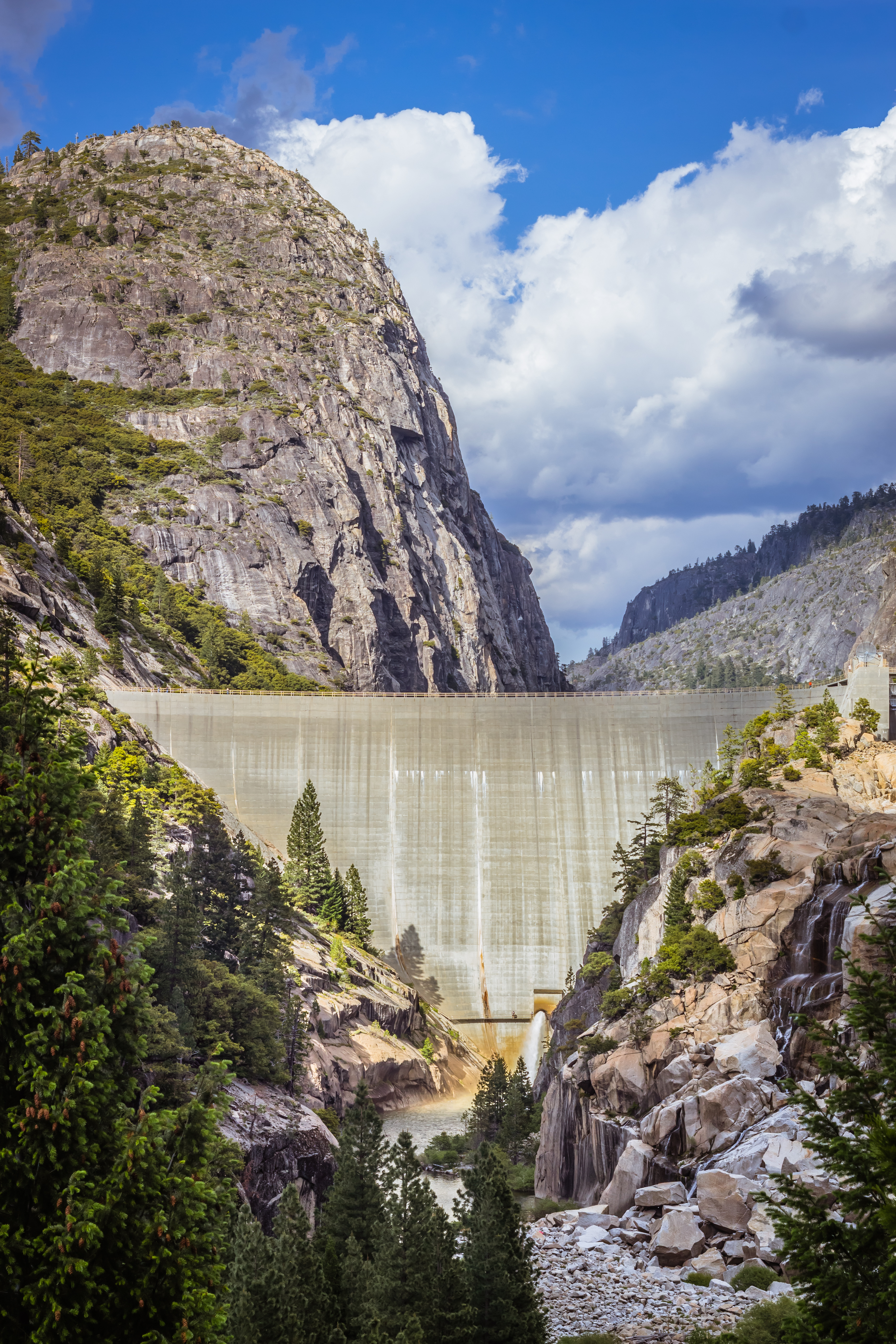
Donnells Dam

Hydropower generation has generally taken second priority behind agriculture in the history of Stanislaus River water development; power facilities were attached to irrigation dams to take advantage of the river's steep fall from the Sierra Crest to the Central Valley. However, other projects were also built purely to take advantage of the river's great hydroelectric potential: in a span of about 60 miles (97 km), the Stanislaus descends almost 10,000 feet (3,000 m) from the headwaters of the Middle Fork to the valley floor at Knight's Ferry. The North and South Forks of the river also experience similarly swift drops, although neither carry as much water as the Middle Fork. Hydro plants on the Stanislaus River have a total capacity of more than 780 megawatts and generate 1.7 billion kilowatt hours per year.

With the exception of small run-of-the-river projects such as Charles Tulloch's 1895 hydro plant, the first major hydroelectric project on the Stanislaus River was the 1916 Spring Gap Powerhouse near Strawberry, constructed by Pacific Gas & Electric (PG&E) and still in operation today. Water diverted from the South Fork plunges more than 1,800 feet (550 m) down a mountainside to a seven megawatt power station on the Middle Fork. In 1939 PG&E completed the much larger Stanislaus Powerhouse near the confluence of the Middle and North Forks. Water was diverted from the Middle Fork at Sand Bar Dam, and a 11.4-mile (18.3 km) long tunnel was drilled through the mountains to carry it to the powerhouse. Because the water is diverted so far upstream, it affords a head of over 1,000 feet (300 m) to the Stanislaus Powerhouse; the much heavier flow of the Middle Fork means that more power can be generated – about 91 megawatts at full capacity.

PG&E also built the original 22 megawatt power station at the old 1926 Melones Dam, under a 40-year contract with the Oakdale and South San Joaquin Irrigation Districts. While the power company would be allowed to market and earn revenue on the hydroelectricity produced, it had to pay royalties since the dam was owned by the irrigation districts. This model proved useful for financing irrigation projects on the Stanislaus River; hydropower sales contributed greatly to repaying the bonds issued for construction. The irrigation districts again entered into a contract with PG&E when they built the much more ambitious Tri-Dam Project. Two of the reservoirs, Donnells and Beardsley, were to be built at high elevations (4,900 and 3,400 feet (1,500 and 1,000 m), respectively), affording huge hydroelectric potential. The 72 megawatt Donnell powerhouse and the 11 megawatt Beardsley powerhouse were built as part of the Tri-Dam Project, in addition to an 18 megawatt plant at the Tulloch Dam further downstream. An added benefit was that the Donnells and Beardsley dams regulate water flow down the Middle Fork, allowing more consistent power generation at the older Stanislaus Powerhouse.

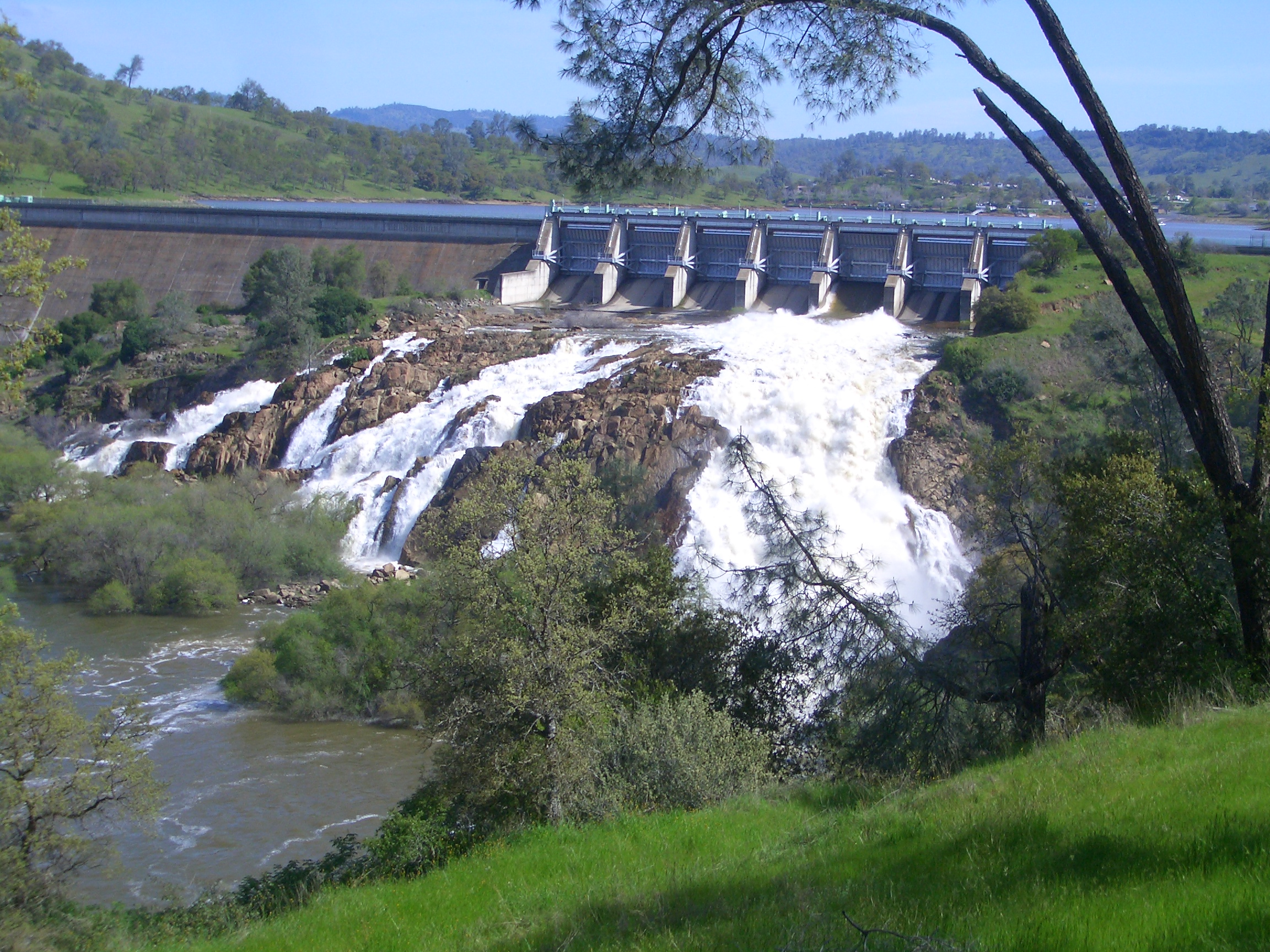
The 18 megawatt Tulloch Dam is the lowermost hydroelectric plant on the Stanislaus River

During the spring snowmelt, these high-elevation hydro projects operate at full load around the clock; any river flow in excess of the powerhouse capacity must be spilled (bypassed) and becomes wasted energy. The irrigation districts and PG&E must coordinate operations at the reservoirs and powerhouses to maximize both water storage and power production. In late summer and autumn, river flows are lower and the power plants are typically only operated several hours a day, on a peaking basis. The 300 megawatt New Melones Dam power station, which replaced the old Melones powerhouse in 1978, is also operated on a peaking schedule. The result is often wildly fluctuating water levels along the dam-controlled segments of these rivers. Tulloch Dam, located directly below New Melones, serves to re-regulate the river flow and ensure a consistent water level in the lower portion of the Stanislaus River.

The last major hydroelectric project to be built on the Stanislaus River was the North Fork project, officially known as the North Fork Stanislaus River Hydroelectric Development Project. It was built by a partnership between the Calaveras County Water District and the Northern California Power Agency for both hydropower and domestic water supply. Although proposed since the 1950s, the project was not built until the late 1980s. The primary features include the 189,000-acre-foot (0.233 km^{3}) New Spicer Meadow Reservoir completed in 1989, the McKays Point diversion dam and tunnel on the North Fork, and the Collierville Powerhouse located near Hathaway Pines and the older Stanislaus Powerhouse. Water falls from a height of 2,270 feet (690 m) – more than at any other power station in the Stanislaus River system – to the powerhouse, where it generates up to 253 megawatts.

In 2004, PG&E's license for the Tri-Dam project expired, and a new contract with the irrigation districts had to be negotiated. One of the conditions was to increase in-stream flows in the portions of the Stanislaus River that were dried up by hydropower diversions. Similar conditions had been set during the relicensing of the Spring Gap-Stanislaus project in 1997. The increased flows will benefit recreation along the Sierra portions of the Stanislaus River, including whitewater boating, and fishing for rainbow and brown trout. The irrigation districts now jointly own the hydro facilities as the Tri-Dam Power Authority and sell power to PG&E under contract.

Hydroelectric power plants in the Stanislaus River system
Name	Owner (Note: CCWD: Calaveras County Water District. NCPA: Northern California Power Agency. OID: Oakdale Irrigation District. PG&E: Pacific Gas and Electric Company. SSJID: South San Joaquin Irrigation District. UPA: Utica Power Authority. USBR: U.S. Bureau of Reclamation.)	Capacity (MW)	Annual generation (MWh, 2001–2015)	Stream
Angels	UPA	1.4	5,308	Other
Beardsley	OID/SSJID	11.0	44,635	Middle Fork
Collierville	CCWD/NCPA	253.0	431,822	North Fork
Donnells	OID/SSJID	72.0	248,562	Middle Fork
Frankenheimer	SSJID	5.0	14,364	Other
Murphys	UPA	3.6	13,441	Other
New Melones	USBR	300.0	417,880	Mainstem
Phoenix	PG&E	2.0	9,357	South Fork
Sand Bar	OID/SSJID	16.2	69,481	Middle Fork
Spicer Meadow	CCWD/NCPA	6.0	16,213	North Fork
Spring Gap	PG&E	7.0	33,744	South Fork
Stanislaus	PG&E	91.0	334,251	Middle Fork
Tulloch	OID/SSJID	17.1	98,504	Mainstem
Woodward	SSJID	2.8	4,946	Other
Total		788.1	1,740,457	

== Ecology ==
=== Plants and animals ===
The upper Stanislaus River watershed is mostly forested, with mixed coniferous communities (ponderosa pine, white fir, Jeffrey pine, incense cedar and sugar pine) along the hills and ridges. Hardwood forests (California black oak, canyon live oak and blue oak) and gray pine are common along streams and canyon bottoms, and in the foothills other hardwoods such as chamise, manzanita and mountain mahogany are present. Riparian zones, which include white alder and willow, are rare due to limited space along the narrow, rocky streambeds. Vernal pools, or seasonal ponds, are found in some of the flatter areas and also support riparian vegetation. Although mostly taken over by agriculture today, the lower watershed once was home to grasslands, oak woodland, and chaparral, which are still extant in some foothill areas. The river's annual floods once spread for miles over the surrounding terrain. There were extensive wetlands and riparian zones along waterways with a canopy of cottonwood, sycamore and valley oak. Riparian zones have experienced further decline from development in the floodplain and extensive mining for sand and gravel. However, some large areas of riparian habitat do remain, such as around Caswell Memorial State Park.

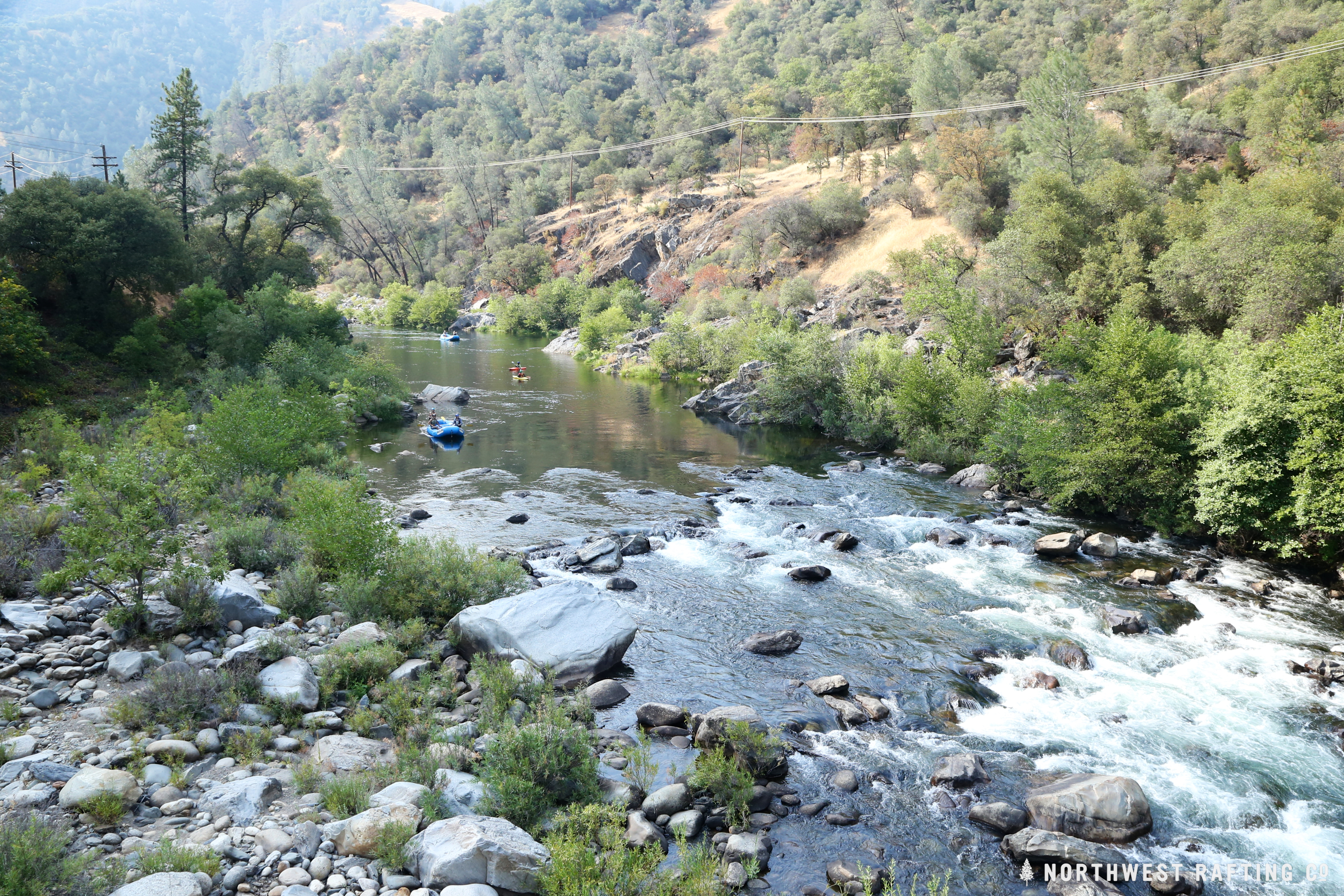
Stanislaus River canyon at Big Dog Rapid, near the head of New Melones Lake

The California Department of Fish and Game has identified up to 35 amphibian and reptile species, 57 mammal species, and more than 200 bird species in the Stanislaus River watershed. Large mammals such as mule deer, bighorn sheep and black bear are common in the Stanislaus National Forest, which encompasses the high elevations of the watershed. The Stanislaus River is habitat for aquatic furbearers including beaver, river otter, and mink, which were extensively trapped for their fur during the 19th century. At least 36 fish species are known to exist in the lower Stanislaus River, including both native species such as salmon, steelhead/rainbow trout, Pacific lamprey, hardhead and Sacramento pikeminnow as well as introduced species such as carp, sunfish and bass.

=== Salmon and steelhead ===
The Stanislaus River provides habitat for native anadromous fish, particularly Chinook (king) salmon, and steelhead, which spend their adult lives in the ocean but must return to fresh water to spawn. In its natural state the Stanislaus had a major spawning run in the late spring (April–June) and smaller runs in the fall and winter. The construction of Goodwin Dam in 1913 blocked migration to about half of the available spawning habitat in the Stanislaus River basin, and populations have declined thereafter, especially since the construction of the Melones and Tri-Dam projects which changed the flow pattern in the Stanislaus River. Between 1952 and 2015, the fall chinook population has ranged from a high of 35,000 in 1953 to zero in 1977. The average fall chinook number in the 21st century has been 3,558 fish.

Water diversions have historically been considered the major factor decreasing salmon and steelhead populations. Before the construction of New Melones Dam, the river frequently ran dry starting in early summer, especially in drought years, due to farmers taking all the water. This prevented spring-run smolt from making their way down to the sea. The little water left was usually too warm for the fish to survive. In 1992, federal dam operators began releasing large volumes of water or "pulse flows" into the Stanislaus River during the critical spring and fall spawning seasons hoping to replicate natural conditions of snowmelt and autumn storms, respectively, in order to help the fish reproduce. Between 2000 and 2009, about 55 percent of the Stanislaus River unimpaired flow was released from Goodwin Dam into the lower river, far more than the historical average of 39 percent. This is also considerably more than flows released into the nearby Tuolumne and Merced Rivers, which are also historical salmon and steelhead habitat. In fall 2015 higher flows on the Stanislaus River led to more than 11,000 chinook returning to the river, as compared to less than 1,000 fish in the Tuolumne and Merced.

Because fishery flows compete with irrigation needs for water, the program has been unpopular with local farmers and water districts, as well as recreation dependent on Stanislaus reservoirs. Also, despite the pulse flows, salmon and steelhead have continued to decline from the late 20th century into the 21st century (with occasional resurgences in flood years). Spring-run chinook have since gone extinct in the Stanislaus watershed, while the spring and fall steelhead runs are considered threatened. One of the biggest factors is that temperatures must be lower than 55 °F (13 °C) for optimal spawning conditions. In years of drought, releasing too much water for steelhead in the spring leaves too cold water for salmon and steelhead in the fall. Other influences such as decrease of riparian habitat, gravel mining, and introduced predatory fish have also heavily affected native fish populations.

==== River flow debate ====
On April 8, 2015, after four years of severe drought, the Bureau of Reclamation began releasing water from New Melones for fish, ignoring protest from farmers. Irrigation district managers ordered the gates closed at Tulloch Dam to prevent the water from flowing downstream. After a brief standoff lasting several hours, the Bureau of Reclamation stopped the flow. The districts objected because releasing water in the spring would cut drastically into their supply, as state regulations require that a certain volume of water be retained in New Melones for fall fish releases. Due to the drought, New Melones Lake was already at a low level, and there was not enough water to meet the farmers' demands in addition to the spring and fall releases. Ultimately, a temporary compromise was reached, allowing the lake to be drawn down to a lower level than environmental restrictions typically allow. This met the districts' demands for the year but also resulted in higher water temperatures.

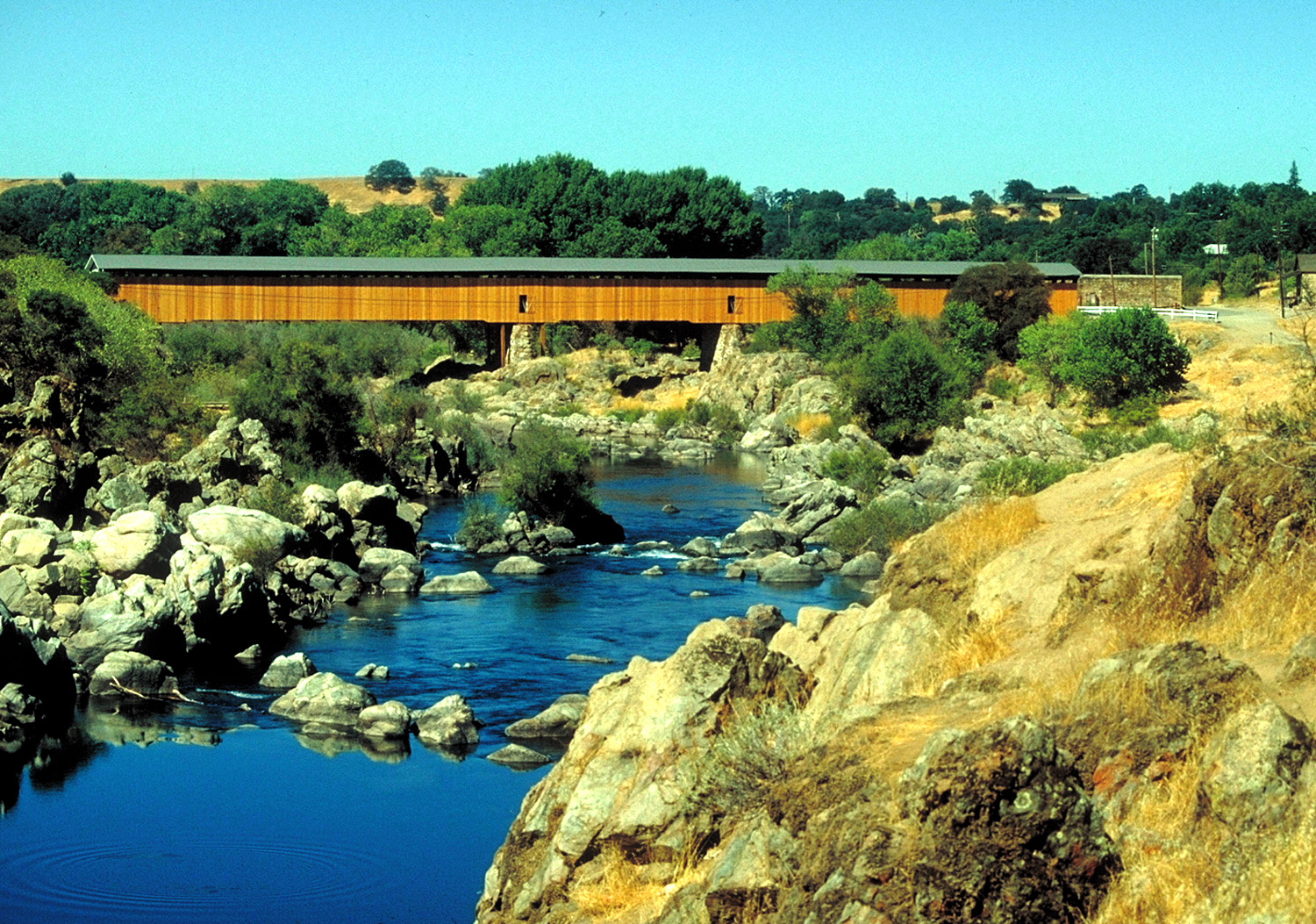
Low water on the Stanislaus River at Knights Ferry Covered Bridge

The effect of higher flows on anadromous fish has been difficult to quantify, in part due to the myriad of other factors such as pollution and non-native predators. A 2009 biological opinion from the National Marine Fisheries Service suggested that even higher flows would be required for the fish populations to truly benefit. In 2017, the independent environmental consulting group FISHBIO released a study showing that the number of outmigrating fish may not be as strongly related to artificial pulse flows as previously thought. Data from the 2005–2016 period indicated that fish migration responded the same way to river flows of 700 cubic feet per second (20 m^{3}/s) as they did to the required flows of 1,200 to 1,500 cubic feet per second (34 to 42 m^{3}/s). Furthermore, the study found that most out-migration occurred during natural rainfall events along the lower river, rather than artificial pulse flows from upstream dams.

The California Department of Water Resources has continued to push for higher flows in the Stanislaus, Tuolumne, Merced and San Joaquin Rivers with the specific focus on volume of water released during spring runoff. Although over the course of the year, over half of the Stanislaus River's runoff is allowed to flow unimpaired down the river, this proportion is much lower – 20 percent or less – during the spring snowmelt when the majority of water is being captured in reservoirs for later use. The state has recommended that 40 percent of the spring runoff be allowed to flow down the river; some environmental groups have pushed for as much as 60 percent. These amounts would be greater than what is already required, leaving even less to support the local farming economy. The South San Joaquin Irrigation District – which, under the proposal, stands to lose as much as two-thirds of its surface water supply during dry years – has pushed for all factors and potential solutions to be considered, including "better timing of releases, habitat restoration, hatchery management, addressing predators, water temperatures, more restrained water releases, and cool water pools behind reservoirs".

The environmental program has also met with pushback from federal representatives, including a bill introduced to Congress by Tom McClintock (R-Calif.) in 2015, which would have allowed conservation of reservoir storage during droughts, rather than releasing it for environmental purposes. Due to the Stanislaus River's limited flow, it has become clear that not all the demands on the river can be fully satisfied, forcing federal, state and local water managers to compromise. An interim program started in 2016 allows the Stanislaus irrigation districts to sell some river water to the San Luis & Delta-Mendota Water Authority, which represents federal contractors in the southern San Joaquin Valley, at premium prices. Because the water must travel down the Stanislaus and San Joaquin Rivers to the Delta before it can be pumped south, it can be used to fulfill Stanislaus fishery flow requirements, essentially performing double duty. In 2016, this plan was able to conserve 75,000 acre-feet (93,000,000 m^{3}) of water.

== Recreation ==
=== Whitewater ===
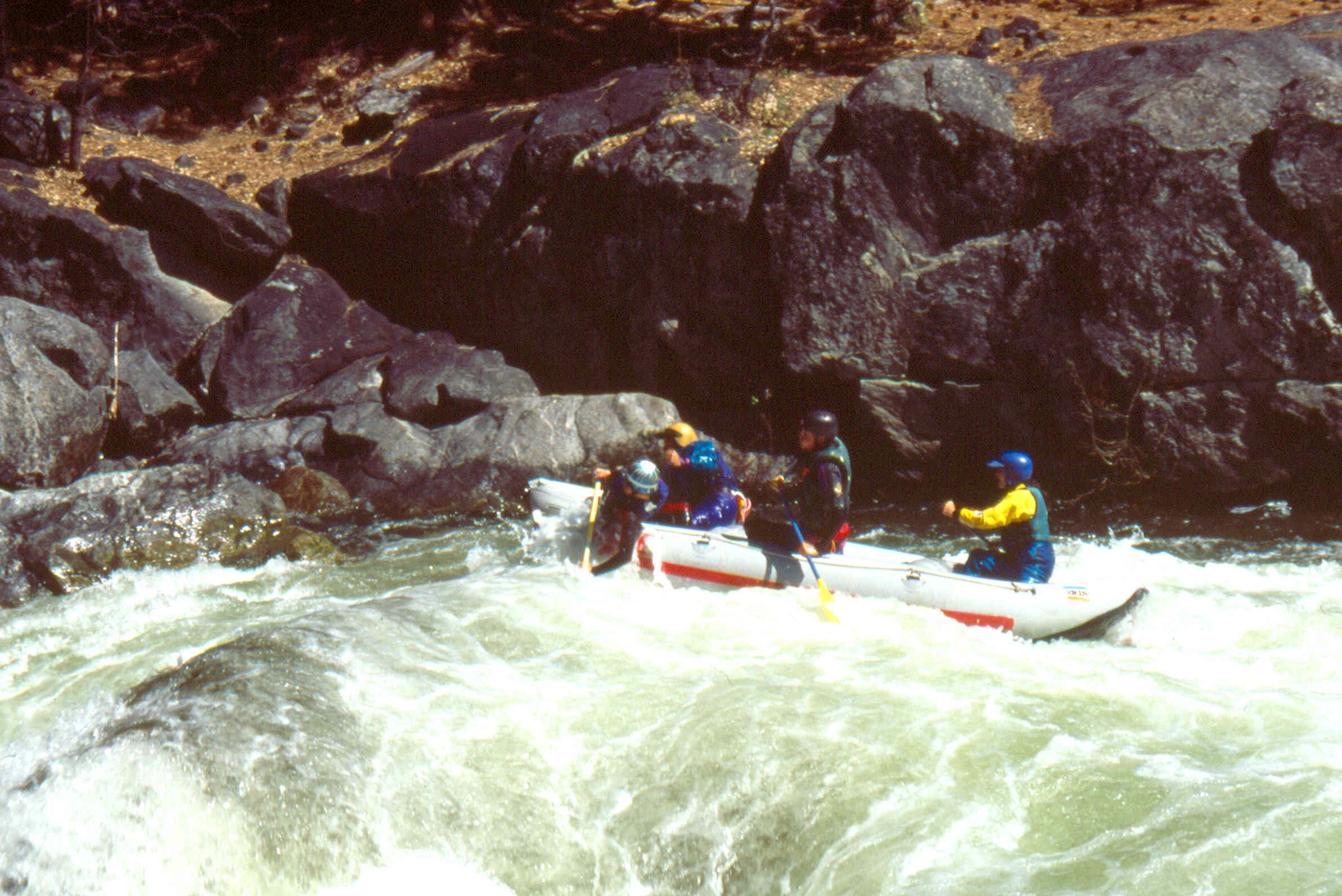
Rafting on the North Fork

The Stanislaus River was California's first popular whitewater river; in the 1970s many commercial outfitters operated on the river between Camp Nine and Parrott's Ferry Bridge. Images and documents of rafting during this time can be found at the Stanislaus River Archive. Although this section was flooded by New Melones Lake in 1983, rafting and kayaking remain popular on sections of the Middle Fork and North Fork, as well as the main stem below Goodwin Dam. In addition, the Camp Nine run reappears when New Melones Lake is low, allowing boaters to run this part of the river, although siltation of the river bed due to reservoir impoundment makes access difficult. As of 2016, the Bureau of Reclamation is considering allowing commercial outfits to operate on the Camp Nine run once more, "whenever river flows and water levels in Melones Reservoir make it possible".

The North Fork is the highest-elevation commercially run river in California, and is also considered one of the most difficult runs in the state with thirteen rapids at Class IV or above. The best flows are typically limited to a six-week window in April and May. During the summer, flows are regulated by New Spicer Meadow Reservoir, which most often releases water at night to generate hydropower. The Forest Service recommends taking a guided trip "due to the demanding and technical nature of the river", although private trips are also permitted. The Goodwin to Knight's Ferry run, though at a gentler gradient than the North Fork, also offers Class IV-V rapids. Below Knights Ferry the Stanislaus becomes wider and smoother, with Class I-II rapids between there and Orange Blossom Park; further downstream many parts of the river are suitable for flat-water boating and swimming.

The Middle Fork has the largest flow, but is subject to numerous hydro-power diversions that often dewater the river bed in summer. The Sand Bar and Mt. Knight runs (14 miles (23 km) in total), rated "difficult" at Class IV–V+ are dependent on releases from Sand Bar Dam, which only occur when river flow exceeds the capacity of Stanislaus Powerhouse. The average season for this run is only about 3 weeks long, typically in early June. The 8-mile (13 km) reach between Donnells Dam and Beardsley Reservoir, known as "Hell's Half Acre", flows through a narrow granite gorge descending 183 feet per mile (35 m/km), including numerous Class V+ (unrunnable) drops; this reach only runs when water is released from Donnells Dam. Due to the increasing popularity of whitewater boating, PG&E has been considering making higher dam releases during the summer.

=== Parks and public access ===
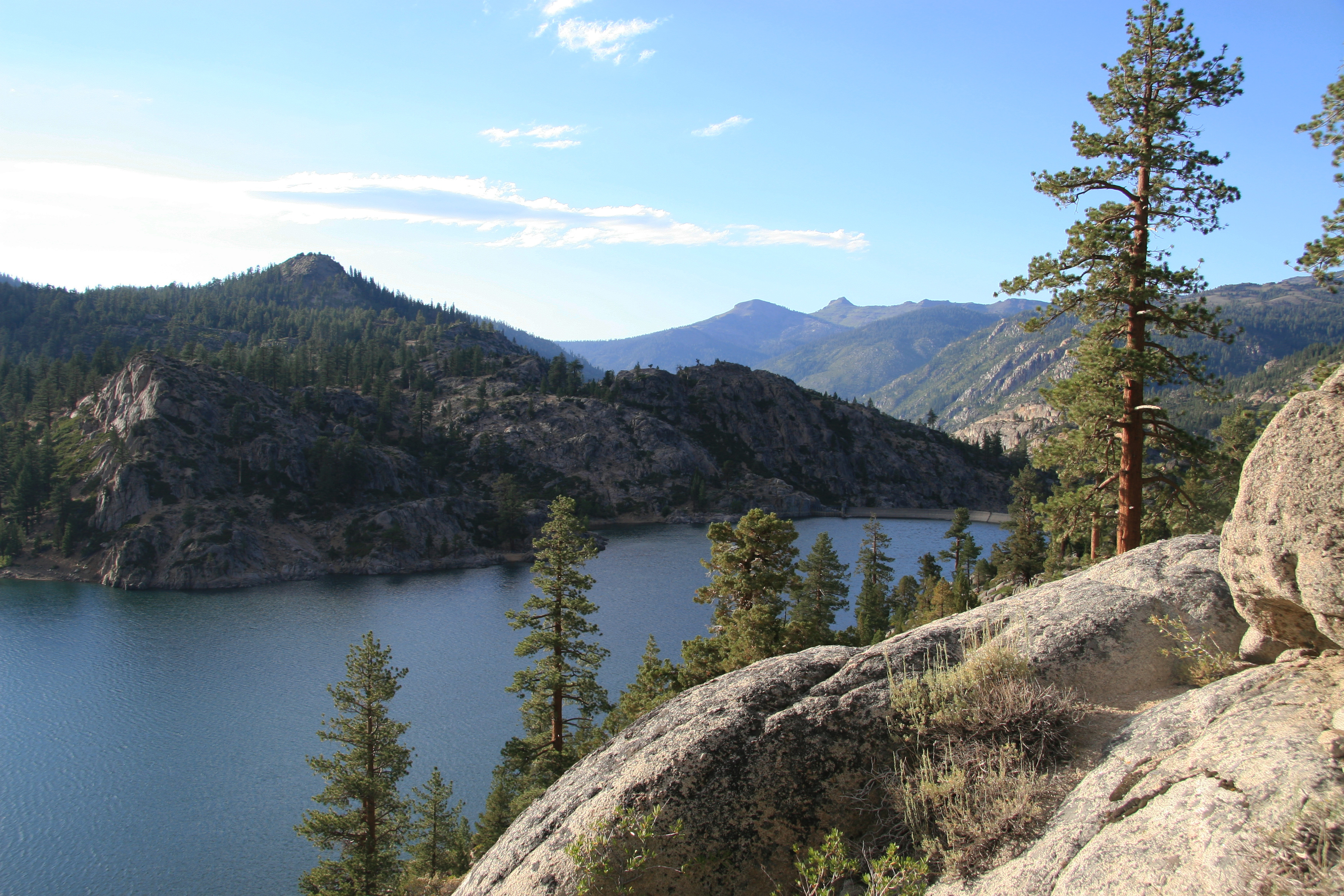
Relief Reservoir is located at the headwaters of the Middle Fork Stanislaus River in the Emigrant Wilderness.

About 520 square miles (1,300 km^{2}) of the upper Stanislaus basin is within the Stanislaus National Forest, which provides a wide range of outdoor recreation including fishing, camping, backpacking, horseback riding, mountain biking and snowmobiling. Highway 108 along the South/Middle Forks and Highway 4 along the North Fork, a designated National Scenic Byway, provide access to the forest from both sides of the Sierra Nevada. Part of the Pacific Crest Trail, which crosses Sonora Pass, also runs through the Stanislaus River watershed. The upper Stanislaus also includes parts of two major wilderness areas. The 161,000-acre (65,000 ha) Carson-Iceberg Wilderness is located along the North Fork and Clark Fork (the name "Iceberg" comes from a distinctive granite formation along the Clark Fork). The Emigrant Wilderness, encompassing 113,000 acres (46,000 ha), encompasses the upper Middle Fork and also borders on Yosemite National Park a short distance to the south.

Boating, water-skiing and camping are also popular on the many reservoirs along the Stanislaus River. The largest, 12,500-acre (5,100 ha) New Melones Lake, is visited by up to 800,000 people per year and includes a full-service marina providing boat rentals and supplies. The 2,000-acre (810 ha) New Spicer Meadow Reservoir (the largest of the Stanislaus' high Sierra lakes) and Beardsley Reservoir both include camping facilities and boat ramps managed by the Forest Service. Donnell Lake is also open to the public, but due to difficult access and rugged terrain, it is much less crowded.

Along the lower Stanislaus River, most of the land is privately owned. However, there are sixteen public access points in the 60-mile (97 km) stretch between New Melones Dam and the San Joaquin River. The Knights Ferry Recreation Area includes the historic Knights Ferry Covered Bridge, the longest such structure in the western US. Other parks along the lower Stanislaus include Horseshoe, Orange Blossom, and Jacob Meyers Parks and the Oakdale and McHenry Recreation Areas, which include riverside trails, campgrounds, and access for boating and fishing. Caswell Memorial State Park covers 258 acres (104 ha) along the lower Stanislaus River and is home to one of the last native riparian oak woodlands in the Central Valley.

== See also ==
- Byrne's Ferry Covered Bridge
- List of rivers of California
- River Junction AVA
- Stanislaus River Archive

== Works cited ==
- Bancroft, Hubert Howe (1886). History of California Vol. II. 1801–1824. The History Company.
- Farquhar, Francis P. (2007). History of the Sierra Nevada. University of California Press.
- Guyton, Bill (1998). Glaciers of California: Modern Glaciers, Ice Age Glaciers, the Origin of Yosemite Valley, and a Glacier Tour in the Sierra Nevada. University of California Press. ISBN 0-520-92618-8.
- Hundley, Norris (2001). The Great Thirst: Californians and Water—A History. University of California Press. ISBN 0-520-92529-7.
- Johnson, Douglas Wilson (1911). Hanging valleys of the Yosemite. University of Michigan.
- Lippincott, Joseph Barlow (1903). California Hydrography. U.S. Geological Survey.
- Lowry, William Robert (2003). Dam Politics: Restoring America's Rivers. Georgetown University Press. ISBN 0-87840-390-6.
- Kanazawa, Mark (2015). Golden Rules: The Origins of California Water Law in the Gold Rush. University of Chicago Press. ISBN 978-0-226-25867-6.
- Nabokov, Peter; Easton, Robert (1990). Native American Architecture. Oxford University Press. ISBN 0-19-984051-2.
- Olsen, Brad (1998). Extreme Adventures: Northern California. Hunter Travel Guides. CCC Publishing. ISBN 1-55650-808-5.
- Palmer, Tim (1984). Stanislaus: The Struggle for a River. University of California Press. ISBN 0-520-05225-0.
- Palmer, Tim (2012). Field Guide to California Rivers. University of California Press. ISBN 978-0-520-95219-5.
- Rohrbough, Malcolm J. (1997). Days of Gold: The California Gold Rush and the American Nation. University of California Press. ISBN 0-520-92207-7.
- Stuart, David R. (2016). "The Native Peoples of San Joaquin County: Indian Pioneers, Immigrants, Innovators, Freedom Fighters, and Survivors" (PDF). San Joaquin County Historical Society. Archived from the original (PDF) on 2020-10-01.
- Tinkham, George Henry (1921). History of Stanislaus County, California: With Biographical Sketches of the Leading Men and Women of the County who Have Been Identified with Its Growth and Development from the Early Days to the Present. Historic Record Company.
- Weston, Othelo (1948). Mother Lode Album. Stanford University Press.
