= Angels Creek =

- Location of Angels Creek in California

Location
- Country: United States
- State: California

Physical characteristics
- Source: Sierra Nevada
  - coordinates: 38°10′04″N 120°24′04″W
  - elevation: 3,377 ft (1,029 m)
- Mouth: Stanislaus River
  - location: New Melones Lake
  - coordinates: 37°58′34″N 120°32′36″W
  - elevation: 1,050 ft (320 m)
- Length: 19 mi (31 km)

Angels Creek is a 19-mile (31 km)-long tributary of the Stanislaus River in Calaveras County, California in the United States. It flows generally southwest from Forest Meadows, through the foothills of the Sierra Nevada, to join the Stanislaus River in New Melones Lake. The creek takes its name from the historic Gold Rush town of Angels Camp. There are two hydroelectric plants on the creek operated by the Utica Water and Power Authority.

== See also ==
- List of rivers of California
