= Byrne's Ferry Covered Bridge =

Californian bridge destroyed in 1957

Coordinates: 37°53′40″N 120°34′37″W

The Byrne's Ferry bridge was a historic cantilevered covered bridge across the Stanislaus River between Calaveras County and Tuolumne County, California. Originally built during the California Gold Rush, the bridge was located on the O'Byrne's Ferry road between Chinese Camp and Copperopolis. Until the mid-20th century, it was one of the last remaining covered bridges in the state; the bridge was destroyed in 1957 (after an unsuccessful attempt to move it) to make way for the construction of Tulloch Dam.

== History ==
The bridge was named after the P. O. Byrne ferry which operated on the Stanislaus River as early as 1849 to service gold seekers in the area. At that time, the crossing locale was known as Waterville and, later, Poker Flat. Bret Harte's The Outcasts of Poker Flat is said to be written of this site. Patrick (or Peter; it is not known which, as he signed all stock certificates as P. O. Byrne) O. Byrne established a river crossing ferry here and determined that there was much future economic prosperity to be gained and chartered the Stanislaus Central Bridge Company that was to erect a steel suspension bridge crossing the Stanislaus River and later to be reached by a railroad from Stockton. Originally a chain cable suspension bridge with a plank floor, it was completed in the spring of 1853 and was to be opened to the public as a toll bridge. Before opening, the bridge was determined to be structurally lacking and requiring additional anchor chains. Nonetheless, a team of oxen and wagon crossed before the official opening of the new bridge and collapsed it. Byrne went on to other endeavors including selling a venture known as the Sacramento Railroad Company to again give railroad access to the gold country with commissioners such as former California Governor Peter Burnett and J. H. Haggin besides P. O. Byrne. It appears that nothing ever came from that speculative opportunity. Nonetheless, the bridge was rebuilt in 1856 by the Table Mountain Bridge Company. This bridge was much stronger, but was destroyed in the Great Flood of 1862, and a new covered cantilever bridge of Howe truss type and reinforced by an auxiliary arch was built that same year. Built and run by the Union Bridge Company, a corporation with headquarters at Sonora. Joseph Aldridge of Green Springs was the toll bridge keeper early on into the 1870s, and Joe Pardies profitably operated the toll bridge for many years.

Fred Burnham, was largely responsible for the Byrne's Ferry bridge being purchased by the counties. In the late 1880s and early 1890s, Burnham was a cattleman in the region and during his annual summer trips into the mountains for better feed he drove his cattle across the bridge at a cost of $25 or $30 for the herd. Because he was dissatisfied with the condition of the bridge, and because he disliked paying the toll fee, Burnham circulated a petition for the bridge to be purchased by the two counties and to be made a free bridge. In 1902, the petition passed and the counties of Calaveras and Tuolumne purchased the bridge for $4,000 and the toll was discontinued.

It is claimed that the Californio bandit Tiburcio Vasquez held up the stage running between Chinese Camp and Copperopolis nearby. Wells Fargo posted a reward for his arrest and conviction and a posse was formed at Poker Flat which then crossed the Byrne's Ferry bridge in pursuit of the bandit. Vasquez escaped only to be captured later in San Jose and hanged not long after.

== Demolition and replacement ==
The Tri-Dam project and the Tulloch Reservoir eventually ended the story of the covered bridge. When filled to capacity, the reservoir backs river water up the canyon for seven miles and forms a large lake that covers the O'Byrne's Bridge site to a depth of eighty feet. In 1957, as the reservoir began to fill, the directors of the two irrigation districts studied the possibility of either burning the bridge where it stood or simply cutting it free from its moorings. But the Calaveras and Tuolumne County Historical Societies and the Copperopolis Community Club, assisted by the Native Sons of the Golden West and many other statewide groups, took an interest in saving the bridge. They started what was known as a "DOLLAR" campaign to cover the cost of preserving the bridge as a future landmark; estimated at the time to be about $9,000. A plan was developed to move the bridge down-stream to a lagoon created by the reservoir where it could span an inlet and once again become a tourist attraction. The California State Parks Commission endorsed the proposal and a Tuolumne County rancher agreed to donate the property upon which the bridge could be located. However, such plans failed to materialize.

On the morning of October 21, 1957, the Calaveras and Tuolumne County supervisors sold the bridge at auction. Several attempts were made to blast the bridge from its supports using dynamite, but the charges were insufficient. As the water rose, the bridge eventually gave up its supports but by then it was partially submerged. Unable to save the bridge, the structure was dismantled and some of the lumber was used to build the nearby resorts. About 3,000 feet upstream from where the old covered bridge stood, a new concrete and steel bridge was built in 1958 at a cost of $458,355.
