= Rose Creek (Tuolumne County, California) =

- Location of Rose Creek in California

Location
- Country: United States
- State: California

Physical characteristics
- Source: Sierra Nevada
  - coordinates: 38°09′36″N 120°23′51″W
  - elevation: 5,143 ft (1,568 m)
- Mouth: Stanislaus River
  - coordinates: 38°06′32″N 120°23′51″W
  - elevation: 1,050 ft (320 m)
- Length: 16.8 mi (27.0 km)

Rose Creek is a tributary of the Stanislaus River in Tuolumne County, California in the United States. The creek is about 16.8 miles (27.0 km) long and flows in a southwesterly direction from Crandall Peak, in the foothills of the Sierra Nevada, to join the Stanislaus River about 4 miles (6.4 km) southeast of Murphys.

The location is portrayed in The Magnificent Seven 2016 remake.

== See also ==
- List of rivers of California
