= New Spicer Meadow Reservoir =

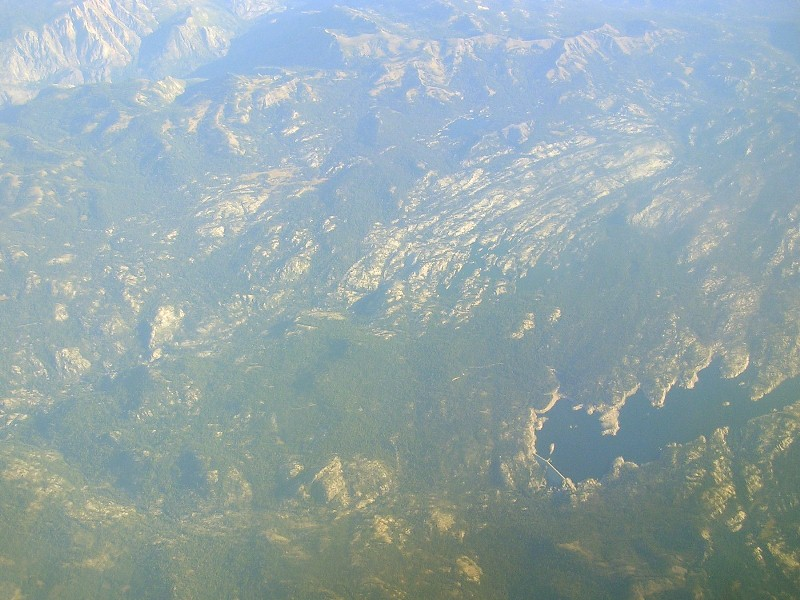
- Aerial view of reservoir (lower right) and the Stanislaus National Forest.

- Location within California Location within the United States
- Location: Sierra Nevada, Stanislaus National Forest, Tuolumne County, California, U.S.
- Coordinates: 38°23′36″N 119°59′49″W
- Type: reservoir
- Primary inflows: Highland Creek
- Primary outflows: Highland Creek (Stanislaus River tributary)
- Basin countries: United States
- Water volume: 189,000 acre-feet (233,000,000 m^{3})
- Surface elevation: 6,621 ft (2,018 m)

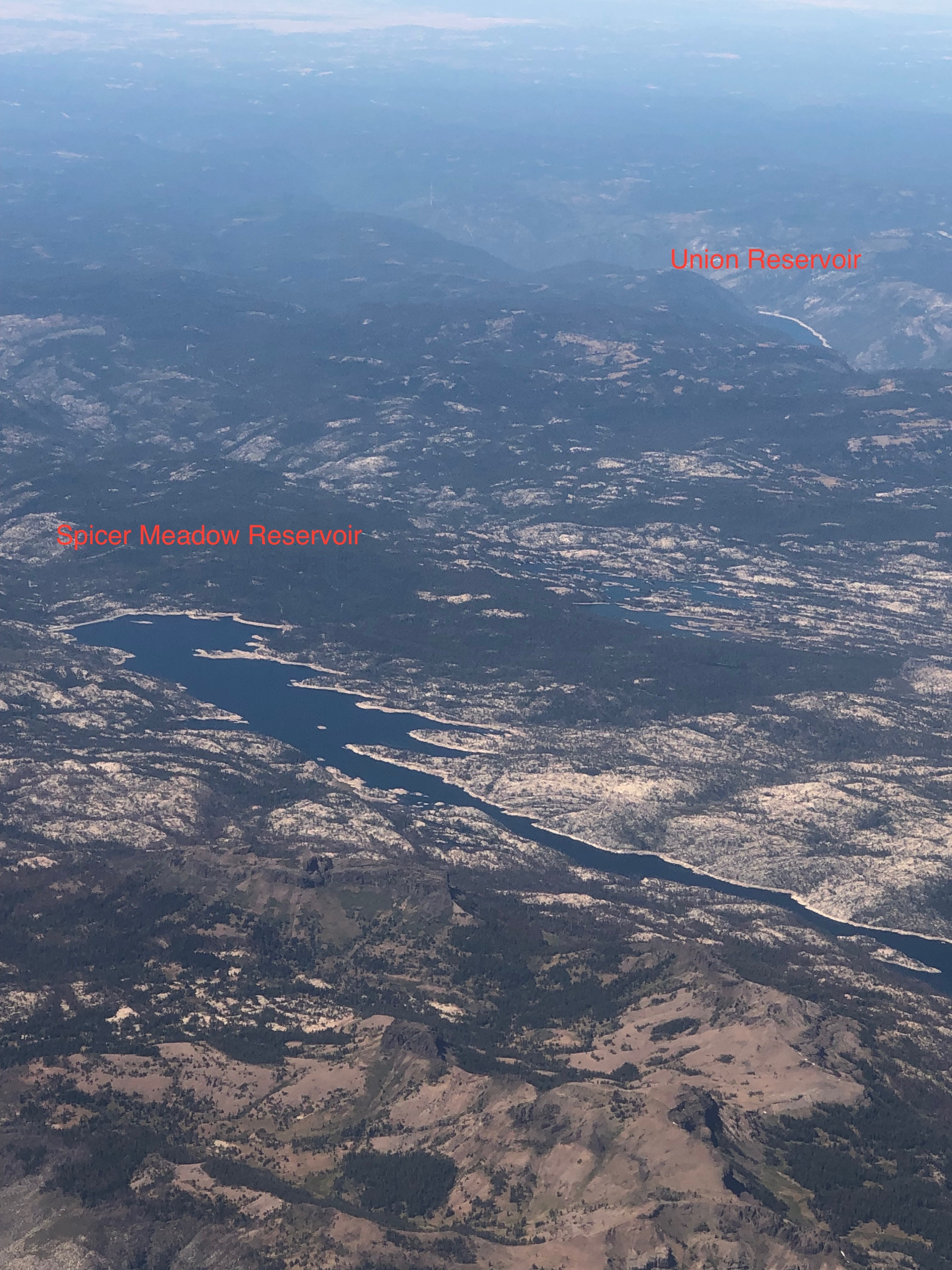
Aerial view of Spicer Meadow Reservoir

New Spicer Meadow Reservoir is a reservoir in the Sierra Nevada, within the Stanislaus National Forest in eastern Tuolumne County, California.

It is located near the western Alpine County line, at an elevation of 6,621 feet (2,018 m).

== Water and power ==
The 189,000 acre-foot (233,000,000 m^{3}) reservoir is formed by New Spicer Meadow Dam on Highland Creek, a tributary of the Stanislaus River. The 265-foot (81 m) tall dam is composed of rock-fill and was completed in 1989; 37 years ago. Additional water is diverted from the North Fork of the Stanislaus River by the North Fork Diversion Dam and a two-mile (3 km) tunnel.

Downstream from the dam and reservoir, the water continues flowing in Highland Creek until its confluence with the North Fork of the Stanislaus River.

Calaveras County Water District owns the dam. Water from the reservoir supplies drinking water and water for recreation and irrigation. Also, along with the Northern California Power Agency, the water district sells electricity from the 5.5-MW hydroelectric plant at the base of the dam. They also operate the 253-MW Collierville Powerhouse on the North Fork of the Stanislaus River.

== See also ==
- List of dams and reservoirs in California
- Stanislaus River topics
