= Middle Fork Stanislaus River =

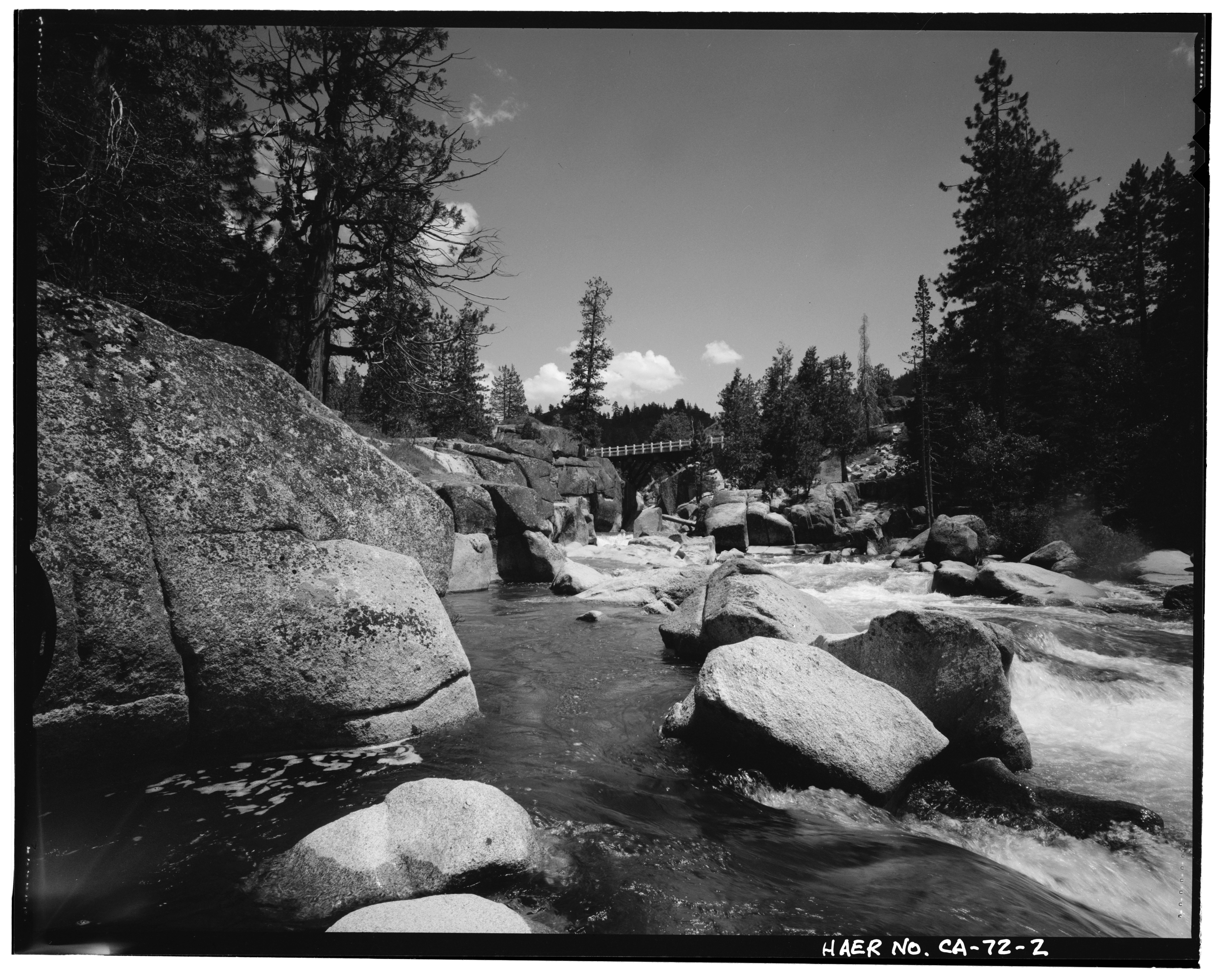
- Middle Fork below Highway 108

Physical characteristics
- Source
  - location: Confluence of Kennedy and Summit Creeks
  - coordinates: 38°17′39″N 119°43′49″W
  - elevation: 6,644 ft (2,025 m)
- Mouth
  - location: Stanislaus River
  - coordinates: 38°09′15″N 120°21′27″W
  - elevation: 1,230 ft (370 m)
- Length: 45.7 mi (73.5 km)
- Basin size: 332 sq mi (860 km^{2})
- Discharge
  - average: 689 cu ft/s (19.5 m^{3}/s)

Basin features
- Progression: Stanislaus–San Joaquin

The Middle Fork Stanislaus River is a 45.7-mile (73.5 km) tributary of the Stanislaus River in the central Sierra Nevada and Stanislaus National Forest of eastern California.

== Geography ==
The river begins at the confluence of Kennedy Creek and Summit Creek in the Emigrant Wilderness. It flows initially northwest, receiving the Clark Fork from the right then turning southwest, through a deep canyon to its confluence with the North Fork Stanislaus River, forming the Stanislaus River. The river drains a watershed of 332 square miles (860 km^{2}) in Tuolumne County, much of it within the Stanislaus National Forest.

== Power and water infrastructure ==
There are four dams on the main stem of the Middle Fork – at Donnells, Beardsley, Beardsley Forebay and Sand Bar Flat. The only significant tributary impoundment is Relief Reservoir, formed by Relief Dam on Summit Creek. Middle Fork water is managed by the Spring Gap–Stanislaus hydroelectric project, owned by Pacific Gas and Electric, and the Tri-Dam project owned by the Oakdale and South San Joaquin irrigation districts.

Tunnels connect the four mainstem reservoirs to take advantage of the hydraulic head created by the Middle Fork's steep drop. The final tunnel, from Sand Bar Flat, enters the main Stanislaus River about 2 miles (3.2 km) below the mouth of the Middle Fork, at the head of New Melones Lake reservoir. As a result, much of the Middle Fork is dewatered during the drier months.

== See also ==
- Dams on the Stanislaus River
- List of rivers of California
- Rivers of the Sierra Nevada (United States)
- Stanislaus River topics
