= Caswell Memorial State Park =

State park in California, United States

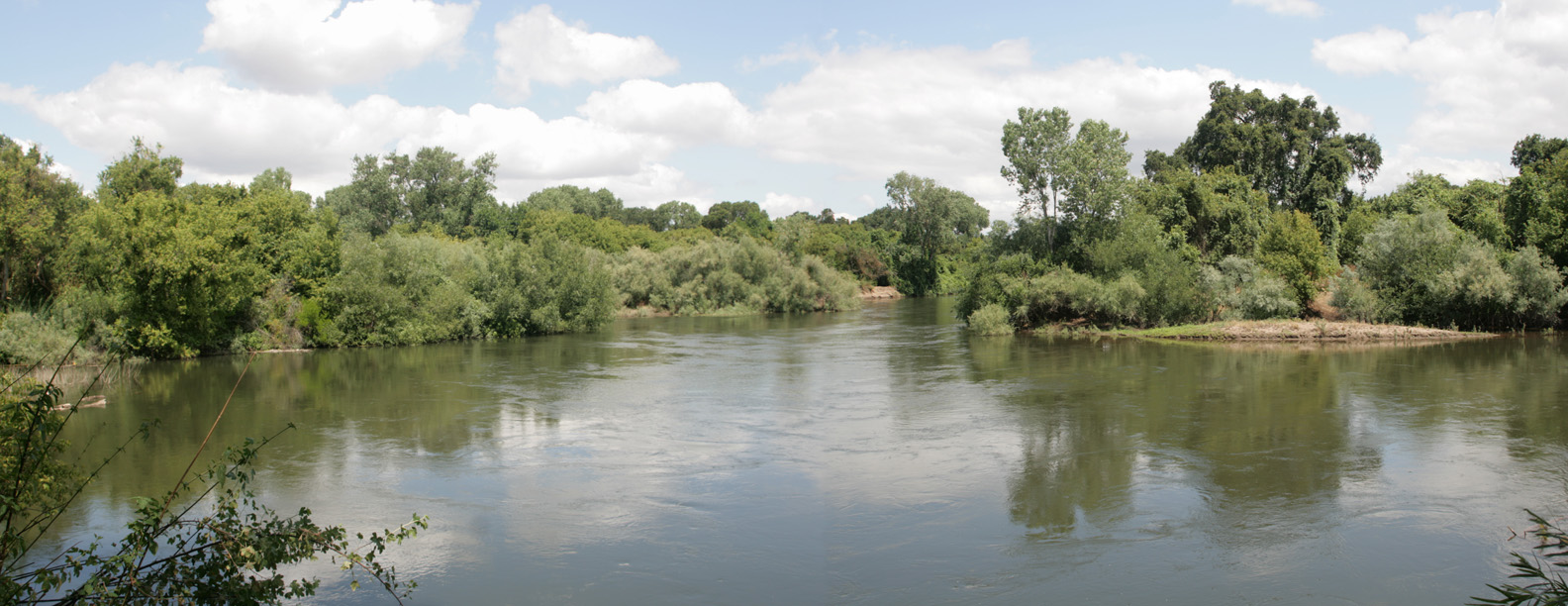
- The Stanislaus River in Caswell Memorial State Park

- Location within California Location within the United States
- Location: San Joaquin County, California, United States
- Nearest city: Ripon, California
- Coordinates: 37°41′36″N 121°11′16″W
- Area: 258 acres (104 ha)
- Established: 1952; 74 years ago
- Governing body: California Department of Parks and Recreation

Caswell Memorial State Park is a state park of California, United States, preserving a riparian forest along the Stanislaus River. It is located in southern San Joaquin County southwest of the town of Ripon. Riparian Oak Woodland, located in this park, is threatened and the park is trying to protect it. It once flourished through California's Central Valley. Caswell is also the home to several endangered species. The 258-acre (104 ha) park was established in 1952.

The average temperature is 45–50 °F (7–10 °C) in the winter and 85–100 °F (29–38 °C) in the summer. It is common to exceed 100 °F (38 °C) for several consecutive days in the summer. Caswell is home to many mosquitoes.

This park is named after the landowner, Thomas Caswell. In the 1950s, 134 acres (54 ha) of this forest were donated by his children and grandchildren to California before it was opened to the public as a state park in 1958.

The riparian brush rabbit (S. b. riparius) is listed as an endangered species by the United States Fish and Wildlife Service. Formerly numerous along the San Joaquin River and Stanislaus River, it is now reduced to a population of a few hundred here and was reintroduced to the adjacent San Joaquin River National Wildlife Refuge. This population has been negatively impacted by the destruction of the riparian habitat.

== See also ==
- List of California state parks
