= Black Creek (Stanislaus River tributary) =

- Location of Black Creek in California

Location
- Country: United States
- State: California

Physical characteristics
- Source: Sierra Nevada foothills
  - coordinates: 38°02′40″N 120°39′26″W
  - elevation: 1,944 ft (593 m)
- Mouth: Stanislaus River
  - location: Copperopolis
  - coordinates: 37°53′49″N 120°35′07″W
  - elevation: 502 ft (153 m)
- Length: 13 mi (21 km)

Black Creek is a tributary of the Stanislaus River in Calaveras County, California, flowing about 13 miles (21 km) in a southerly direction through the Sierra Nevada foothills. Originating near Carmen Peak, it joins the Stanislaus River in Tulloch Lake, near Copperopolis.

== See also ==
- List of rivers of California
