= North Fork Stanislaus River =

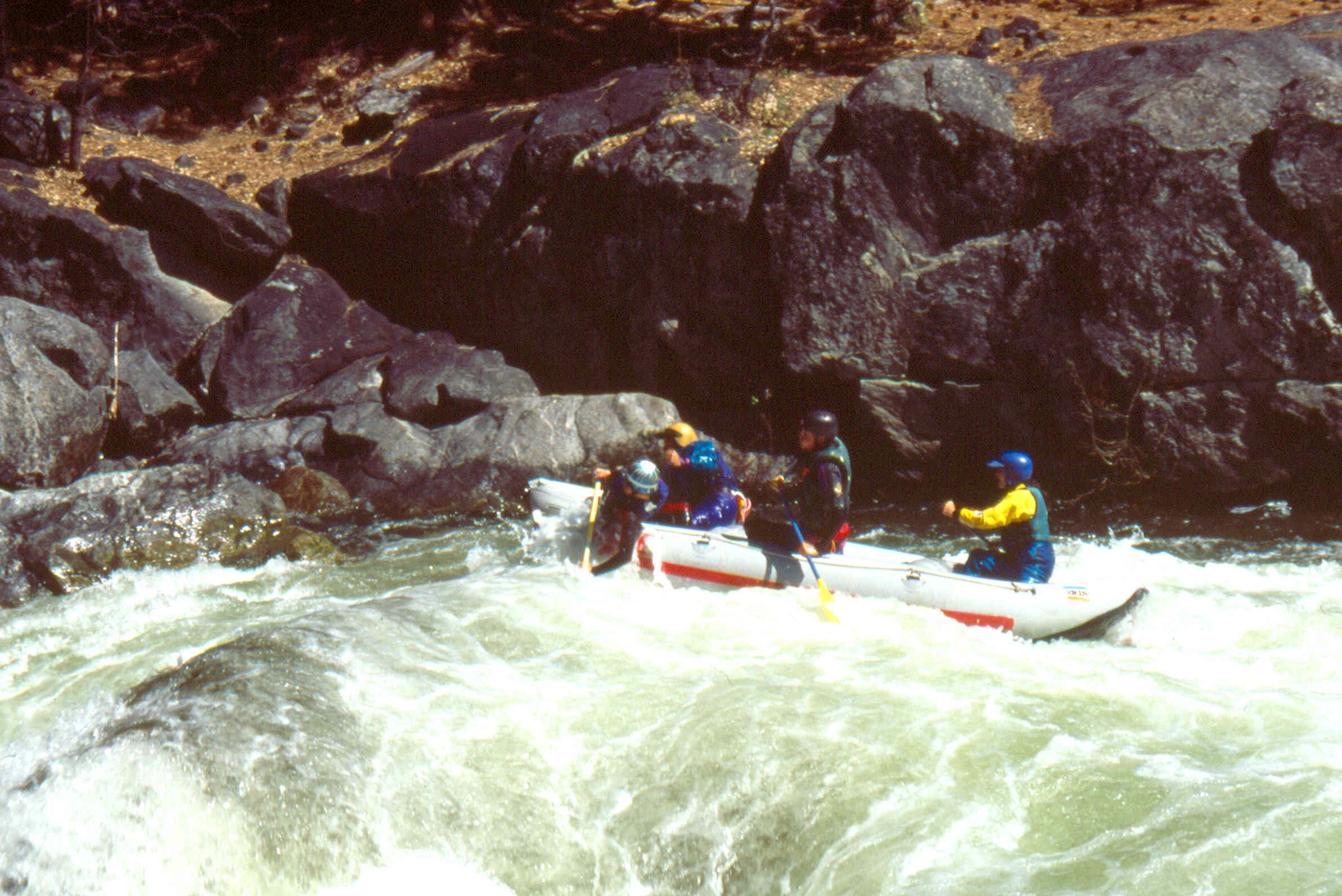
- Rafters on the North Fork

Location
- Country: United States
- State: California

Physical characteristics
- Source
  - location: Confluence of Silver Creek and Duck Creek
  - coordinates: 38°30′54″N 119°54′52″W
  - elevation: 6,716 ft (2,047 m)
- Mouth
  - location: Stanislaus River
  - coordinates: 38°09′15″N 120°21′27″W
  - elevation: 1,230 ft (370 m)
- Length: 31.2 mi (50.2 km)
- Basin size: 196 sq mi (510 km^{2})
- Discharge
  - average: 429 cu ft/s (12.1 m^{3}/s)

Basin features
- Progression: Stanislaus—San Joaquin

The North Fork Stanislaus River is a 31.2-mile (50.2 km) tributary of the Stanislaus River in the central Sierra Nevada and Stanislaus National Forest of eastern California.

== Geography ==
The river flows southwest from Alpine County, through Calaveras County, to Tuolumne County.

The river begins at the confluence of Silver Creek and Duck Creek near the western edge of the Carson-Iceberg Wilderness in the Sierra Nevada. From there it flows southwest through a canyon to its confluence with the Middle Fork Stanislaus River near Forest Meadows, which forms the Stanislaus River. The river drains a mountainous, rugged watershed of about 196 square miles (510 km^{2}).

== Hydroelectricity infrastructure ==
Since the 1980s, the river basin has been extensively developed for hydropower generation. Water from the North Fork is stored in Alpine, Utica, Union and New Spicer Meadows Reservoirs, which regulate the water supply for McKays Point Diversion Dam, located lower down on the North Fork. From McKays Point water is diverted to the Collierville Powerhouse, which can generate up to 253 megawatts.

== See also ==
- Dams on the Stanislaus River
- List of rivers of California
- Rivers of the Sierra Nevada (United States)
- Stanislaus River topics
