= Relief Dam =

Dam in Tuolumne County, California

Coordinates: 38.2814°N 119.7336°W

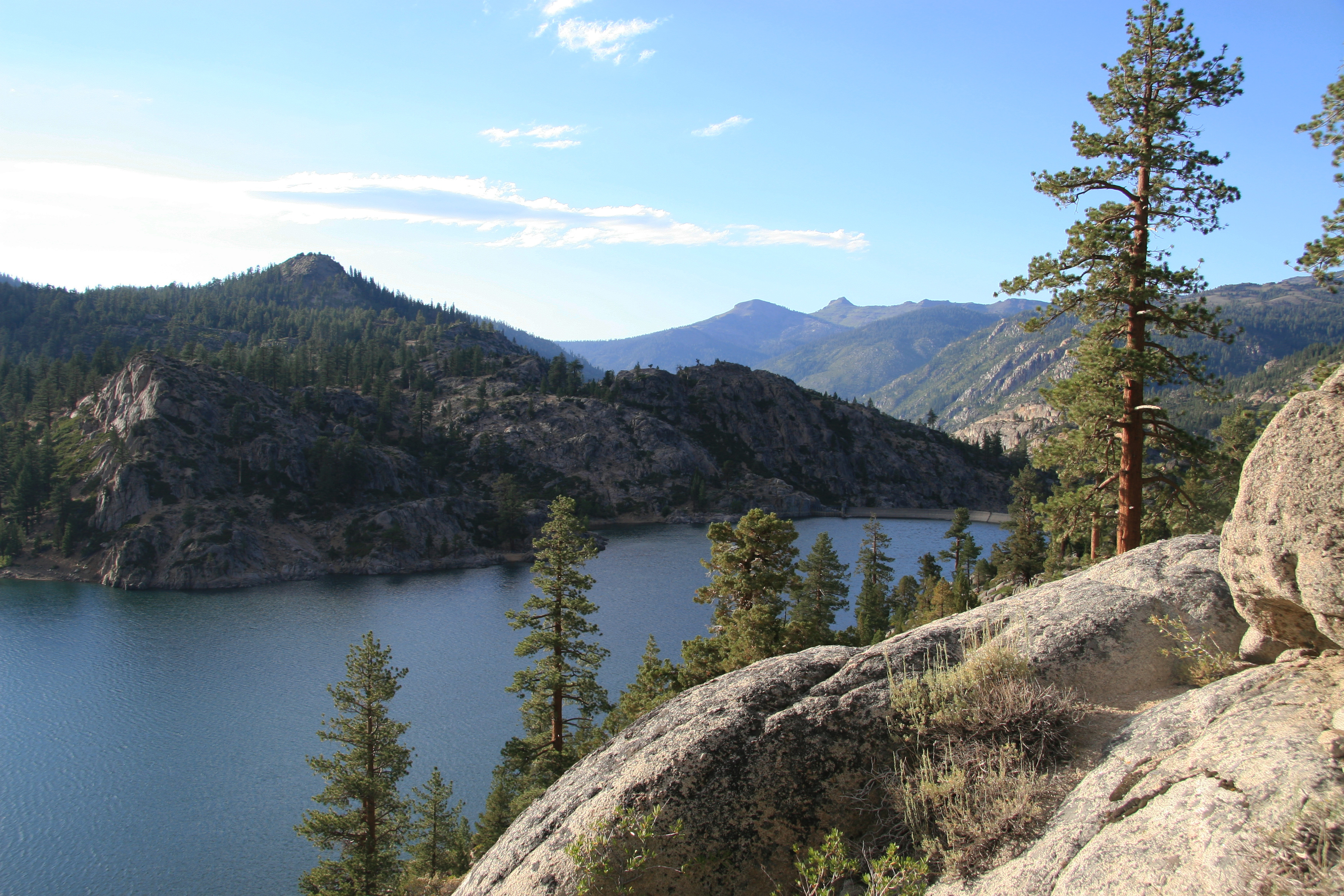

Relief Dam is a rockfill dam on Summit Creek, a tributary of the Middle Fork Stanislaus River, in Tuolumne County, California. The dam is part of the Spring Gap-Stanislaus Hydroelectric Project, and is owned and operated by Pacific Gas and Electric (PG&E).

Completed in 1910, the dam stands 145 feet (44 m) above the riverbed and is 505 feet (154 m) long at the crest. Altogether it contains 136,984 cubic yards (104,732 m^{3}) of fill. The dam forms Relief Reservoir, which has a storage capacity of 15,122 acre-feet (18,653,000 m^{3}) of water and a full surface area of 189 acres (76 ha). The drainage basin behind the dam totals 24.51 square miles (63.5 km^{2}).

The reservoir is primarily drawn down in the late summer and fall to supplement flows to the hydroelectric powerhouses at Donnells Dam and Beardsley Dam (part of the separate PG&E Tri-Dam Project) and others on the Stanislaus River.
