= Hathaway Pines, California =

Unincorporated community in California, United States

Hathaway Pines
- Unincorporated community
- Location in California Hathaway Pines (the United States)
- Coordinates: 38°11′31″N 120°21′56″W
- Country: United States
- State: California
- County: Calaveras
- Elevation: 3,323 ft (1,013 m)

Hathaway Pines is an unincorporated community in Calaveras County, California, United States, 8 km (5 mi) south of Arnold and 20 km (12.5 mi) northeast of Angels Camp. It lies at an elevation of 3323 feet (1013 m). Hathaway Pines' post office was established in 1943; it has the zip code 95233.

The place's name honors Robert B. Hathaway, a vacation resort promoter who became the first postmaster.

== Climate ==
This region experiences warm (but not hot) and dry summers, with no average monthly temperatures above 71.6 °F. According to the Köppen Climate Classification system, Hathaway Pines has a warm-summer Mediterranean climate, abbreviated "Csb" on climate maps.

== Demographics ==
Historical population
Census	Pop.	Note	%±

The United States Census Bureau defined Hathaway Pines as a census designated place (CDP) in 2023.
