= Lake Tulloch =

Lake in Tuolumne County, California

- Location within California Location within the United States
- Location: Tuolumne County, California
- Coordinates: 37°53′46″N 120°35′10″W
- Surface area: 1,260 acres (510 ha)
- Surface elevation: 504 feet (154 m)

Lake Tulloch, located in Copperopolis, California, United States, is one of the few lakes in the state that has private shoreline houses. At roughly 504 feet (154 m) in elevation the lake covers 1,260 acres (510 ha). Lake Tulloch provides water needs to downstream users and hydroelectricity to users throughout the state.

== Background ==
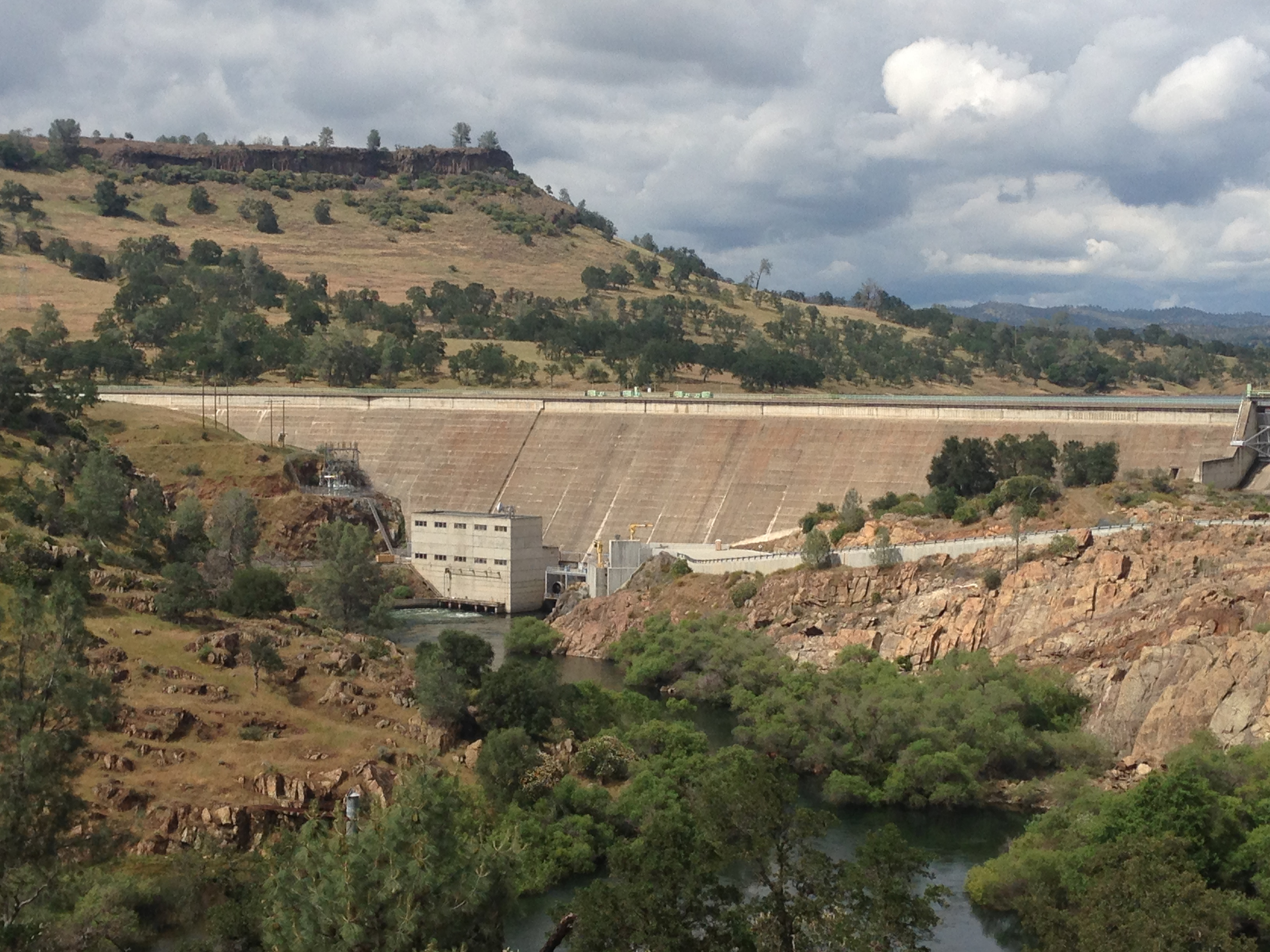

Lake Tulloch had its start in the 1880s with Charles H. Tulloch who acquired a small ditch and water rights in the Central Valley of California. The ditch was originally made by miners for placer gravel. Furthermore, local farmers saw it as a great resource to irrigate their crops. The local farmers widened the ditch, thus irrigating 6,000 acres (2,400 ha) in Oakdale and South San Joaquin. The Oakdale Irrigation District (OID) and the South San Joaquin Irrigation District (SSJID) paid $650,000 to co-own water rights from Tulloch's expanded ditch on the Stanislaus River in July 1910. The two districts received their first license from the Federal Energy Regulatory Commission (FERC) to begin the Tulloch Project. Their permit was effective January 1, 1955 through December 31, 2004 Two years later, the districts received another license on February 28, 2006, that would give them an additional forty years to operate and expire on January 1, 2046.

== Tri-Dam Project ==
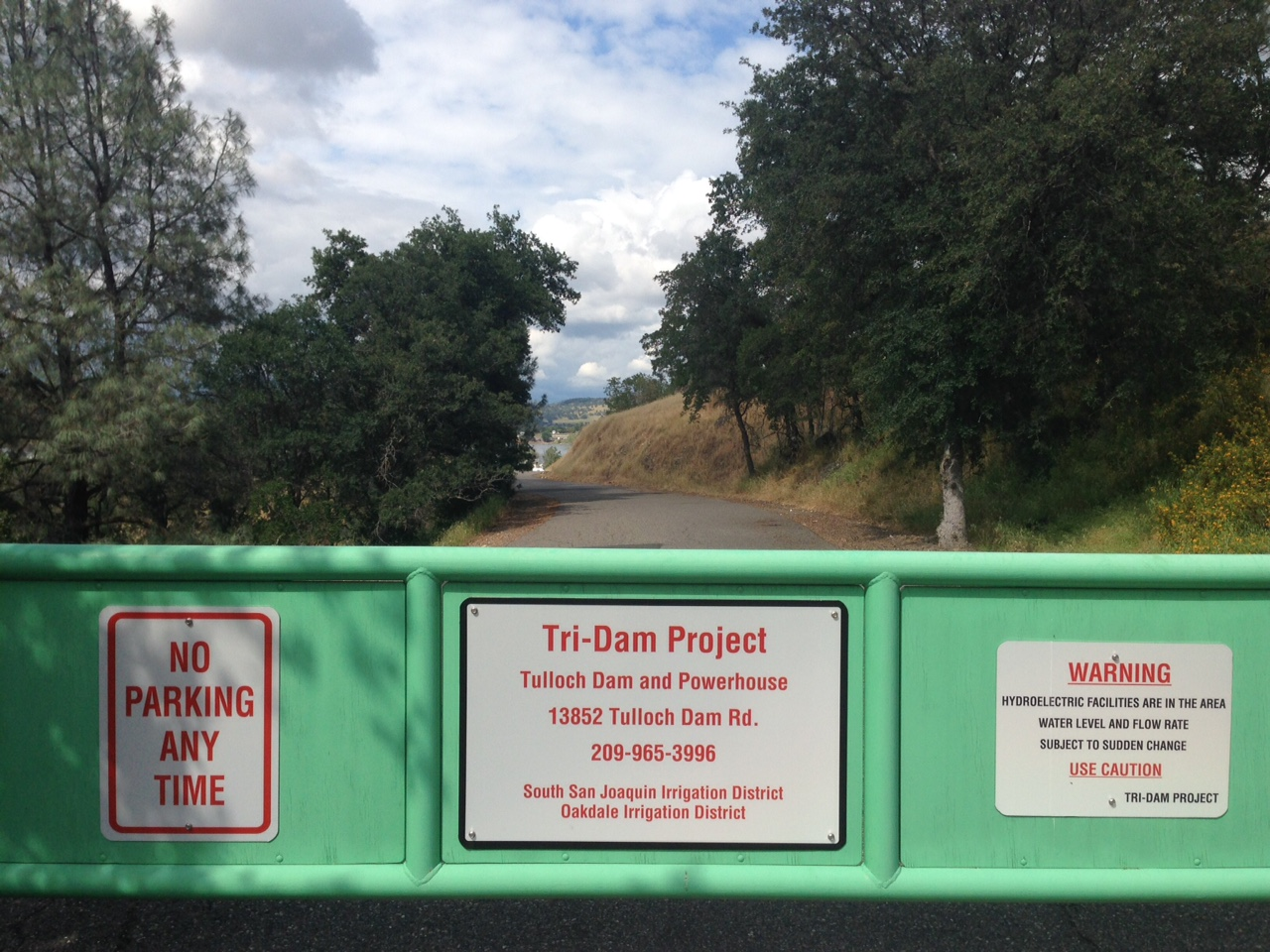

The Donnells Dam, Beardsley Dam and Tulloch Dam projects are located in Tuolumne County, California on the Middle Fork of the Stanislaus River. OID and SSJID co-developed the "Upper Works" (Donnells and Beardsley) and the "Lower Works" (Lake Tulloch) of the Tri-Dam Project Donnells Reservoir, Beardsley Reservoir, and Lake Tulloch were fully operational just two years after its making was agreed upon in 1955. The Tri-Dam met the irrigation obligations and in the 1980s added small hydro-power plants to the dams to provide electricity. These plants are currently controlled by the Turlock Irrigation District. The Tri-Dam project is composed of dams, tunnels, penstocks, powerhouses, communications systems, and offices, all stationed on the Middle Fork of the Stanislaus River.

The Tri-Dam Project administrative offices are in Strawberry, California. A general manager manages the daily activities of the Tri-Dam Project and Tri-Dam Power. The general manager then provides information to the five members on the joint board of directors. The Tri-Dam Power Authority is separate from the Tri-Dam Project, but the general manager is the chief executive officer for both of them.

== Recreation ==
The lake no longer provides recreation uses for the public, including boating, fishing, swimming, and camping. Only private residents and those registered at the one campground can access the lake. Also available at South Lake Tulloch RV Campground and Marina are a restaurant, general store, gas dock, and boat rentals.

Fish commonly caught near or in Lake Tulloch include rainbow trout, brown trout, largemouth bass, smallmouth bass, catfish, crappie, and bluegill.
