= New Melones Dam =

Dam in California

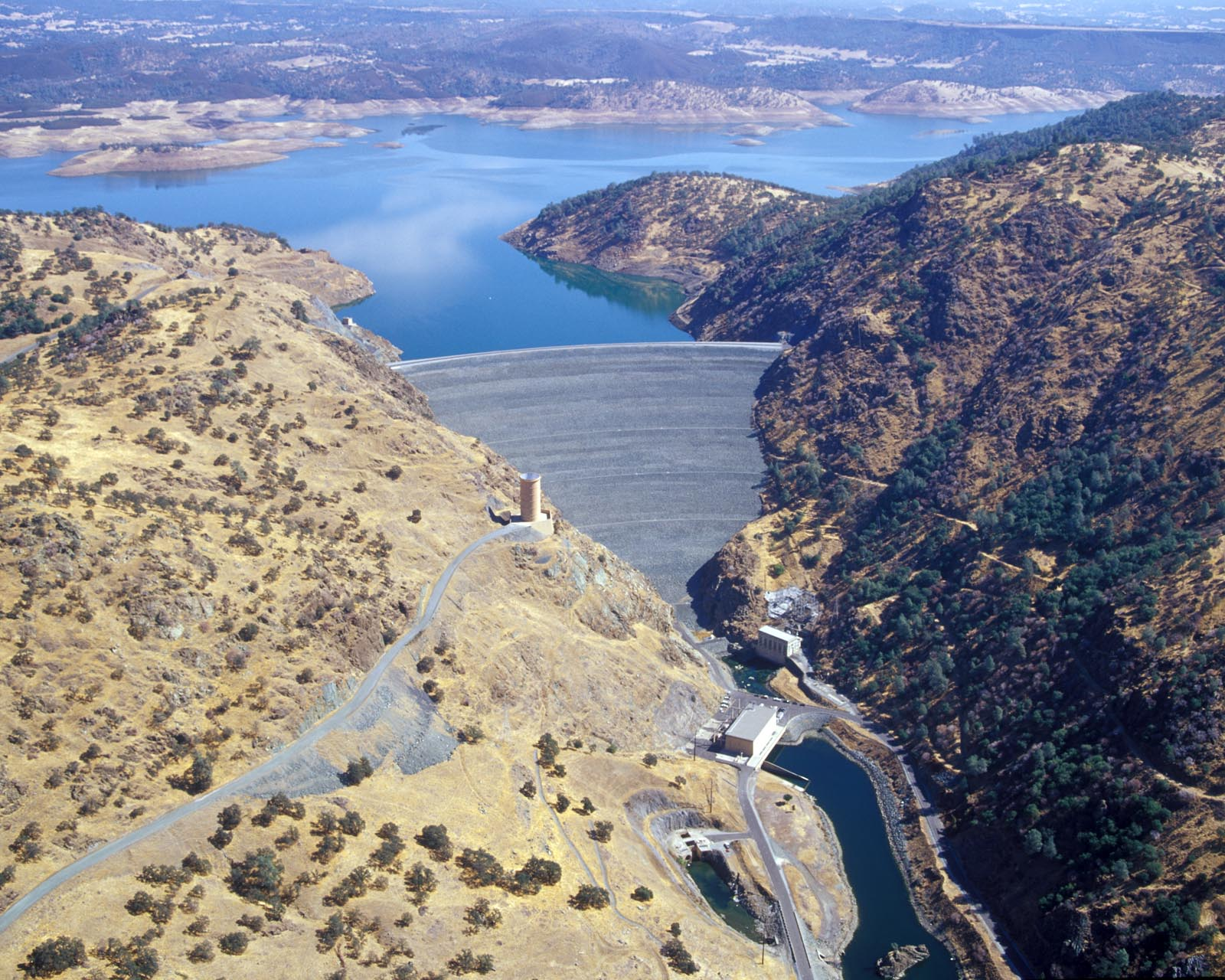
- Interactive map of New Melones Dam
- Country: United States
- Location: Near Jamestown, California
- Coordinates: 37°56′50″N 120°31′41″W
- Construction began: 1966; 60 years ago
- Opening date: 1979; 47 years ago
- Owner: U.S. Bureau of Reclamation

Dam and spillways
- Type of dam: Earth and rock embankment
- Impounds: Stanislaus River
- Height: 625 ft (191 m)
- Length: 1,560 ft (480 m)
- Spillway type: Ungated overflow
- Spillway capacity: 112,600 cu ft/s (3,190 m^{3}/s)

Reservoir
- Creates: New Melones Lake
- Total capacity: 2,400,000 acre-feet (3,000,000 ML)
- Catchment area: 904 mi^{2} (2,340 km^{2})
- Surface area: 12,500 acres (5,100 ha)
- Normal elevation: 1,088 ft (332 m)

Power Station
- Commission date: 1979; 47 years ago
- Hydraulic head: 480 ft (150 m)
- Turbines: 2 × 150 MW Francis
- Installed capacity: 300 MW
- Annual generation: 417,880,000 kWh (2001-2015)

New Melones Dam is an earth and rock filled embankment dam on the Stanislaus River, about 5 miles (8.0 km) west of Jamestown, California, United States, on the border of Calaveras County and Tuolumne County. The water impounded by the 625-foot-tall (191 m) dam forms New Melones Lake, California's fourth-largest reservoir, in the foothills of the Sierra Nevada east of the San Joaquin Valley. The dam serves mainly for irrigation water supply, and also provides hydropower generation, flood control, and recreation benefits.

The dam was authorized in 1944 as a unit of the federal Central Valley Project, a system designed to provide irrigation water to the fertile agricultural region of the Central Valley. It would be built by the U.S. Army Corps of Engineers (Corps), and transferred to the U.S. Bureau of Reclamation (Reclamation) upon completion. In 1966, work began to clear the foundations for a high dam that would replace an earlier, much smaller structure built by two irrigation districts. Construction of the main embankment began in 1976, and was topped out in late 1978. The filling of New Melones Lake began in 1978, and the dam's hydroelectric station produced its first power in mid-1979.

New Melones was the focus of a long environmental battle during the 1970s and early 1980s; critics protested the flooding of a long scenic stretch of the Stanislaus River, which flowed over whitewater rapids through the deepest limestone canyon in the western United States. The protestors employed a variety of methods, some extreme, to prevent the filling of New Melones Lake until 1983, when record-setting floods filled the reservoir and nearly breached the dam's emergency spillway. The fight over New Melones galvanized the river conservation movement in California and influenced major water policy changes on the state and federal levels; since its completion, no other dams of its size or importance have been built in the United States.

The New Melones project has continued to generate controversy, due to the water yield from the project being lower than expected, and the use of New Melones water to meet federal environmental standards at the expense of farming. The reservoir is considered "over-allocated"; in an average year, it is unable to meet all the demands placed on it. The debate over water rights continues today, with environmentalists seeking to further increase fishery flows, and the Stanislaus irrigation districts asserting their senior rights to the river.

== Specifications ==
New Melones Dam and its reservoir comprise the independent New Melones Unit of the Central Valley Project. The dam's primary purpose is to control the runoff from 904 square miles (2,340 km^{2}), or about 92 percent, of the watershed of the Stanislaus River, a major tributary of the San Joaquin River. At 625 feet (191 m) high from the foundations and 1,560 feet (480 m) long, and containing 15,700,000 yd^{3} (12,000,000 m^{3}) of material, New Melones is the second tallest earthfill dam in the United States, after Oroville Dam, and the sixth tallest dam overall. With a crest elevation of 1,135 feet (346 m), the dam rises for 541 feet (165 m) above the streambed. Flood waters are released through an unlined spillway about a mile (1.6 km) northwest of the dam, with a capacity of 112,600 cubic feet per second (3,190 m^{3}/s). The dam also has an outlet works which can release up to 8,300 cubic feet per second (240 m^{3}/s).

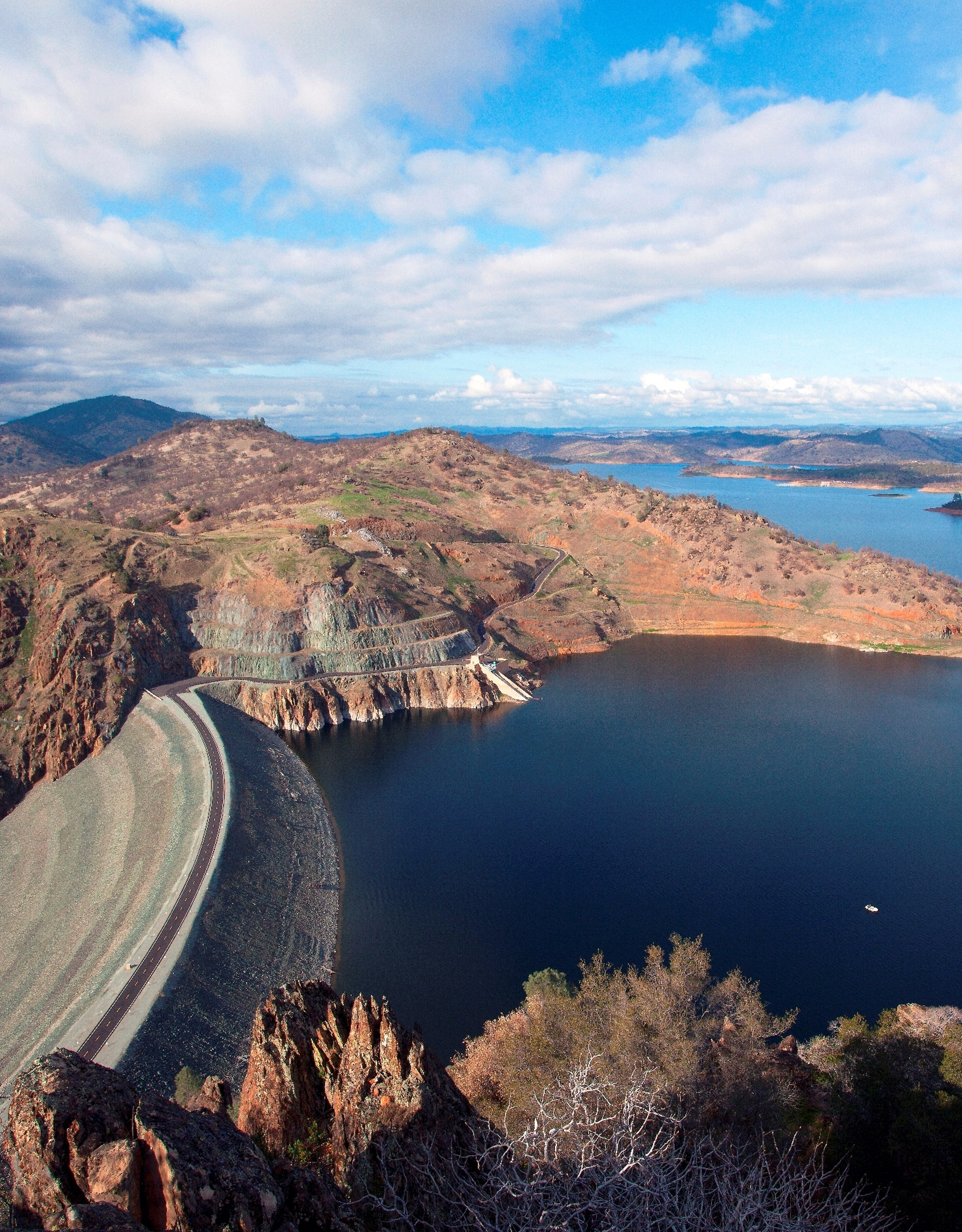
New Melones Dam and Lake, looking north

The impounded water behind the dam forms New Melones Lake, which at full pool of 1,088 ft (332 m) above sea level encompasses 12,500 acres (5,100 ha) of surface water and a volume of 2,400,000 acre-feet (3.0 km^{3}). About 450,000 acre-feet (0.56 km^{3}), 19 percent of the reservoir's capacity, is reserved for flood control. During flooding events, the dam is operated to keep flows on the Stanislaus River below 8,000 cu ft/s (230 m^{3}/s), although this figure may be lowered depending on flow conditions in the San Joaquin River. Between 1978 and 2010 the dam prevented a total of $505 million in flooding damages (adjusted for inflation), including $231 million during the New Year's flood of 1997 alone. However, the Manteca Bulletin noted that the dam was operated carelessly during the 1997 flood – almost 45,000 acres (18,000 ha) of farmland was flooded near the confluence of the Stanislaus and San Joaquin Rivers – and a further $80 million of damage could have been prevented had the reservoir been kept at a safe level.

The dam's hydroelectric power plant is located at its base on the north side of the river, and has a rated hydraulic head of 480 ft (150 m). The plant houses two 150.0 MW Francis turbines for a total capacity of 300 MW. Daily releases are made on a peaking basis; seasonal totals are dictated by irrigation (in summer) and flood control (in winter) requirements below the dam. The release from New Melones is re-regulated by the smaller downstream reservoir of Tulloch Dam, ensuring a stable flow in the Stanislaus River. For the period 2001 to 2015, the plant produced an average of 418 million kilowatt hours (KWh) annually. This ranged from a high of 910 million KWh in fiscal year 2006, to a low of 130 million KWh in 2015. The plant replaced the old 22 MW power station at the original Melones Dam; on average it generates about four times as much electricity as the original did.

By controlling the flows of the Stanislaus River, the dam and reservoir make available 200,000 to 280,000 acre⋅ft (250,000 to 350,000 dam^{3}) of additional water each year. About 213,000 acres (86,000 ha) of land along the Stanislaus River are irrigated using water from New Melones. According to the Bureau of Reclamation, the increase in water supply from New Melones Dam has "translated into prosperity for the region, allowing the growth of cities including Tracy and Manteca, and irrigating high-value crops including almonds, walnuts and grapes." In addition, New Melones Lake is one of the major tourist draws of the region, providing activities such as boating, fishing and shoreline camping. An estimated 800,000 people visit the lake each year; however, droughts can cause the closure of lake facilities due to low water levels.

== History ==
=== Background ===
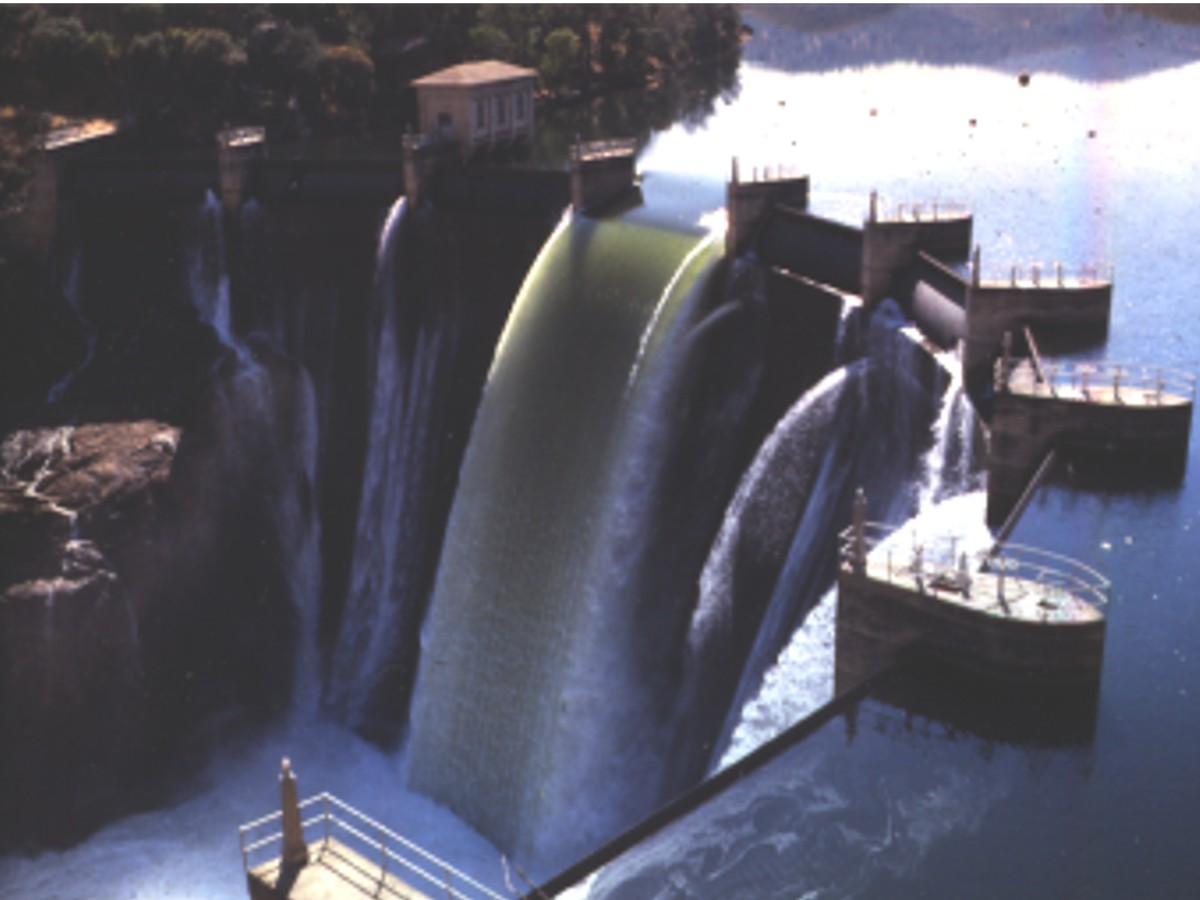
The original Melones Dam

The modern development of the Stanislaus River began with the Oakdale and South San Joaquin Irrigation Districts, which were created in 1909 under the Wright Act to serve farmers in the area. Early irrigation along the Stanislaus River was dependent on the natural flow of the river, which was never enough to water crops during the late summer and fall. In 1926 the two irrigation districts jointly completed the original Melones Dam, a 211-foot (64 m) high concrete arch dam with a storage capacity of 112,500 acre-feet (138,800,000 m^{3}). This reservoir was still not big enough for all the demands placed on it, especially during the long droughts of the 1930s.

The storage capacity of these early reservoirs was limited and the irrigation districts sought to increase the size of the Melones Reservoir. The federal Flood Control Act of 1944 authorized the U.S. Army Corps of Engineers to build a 355-foot (108 m) arch dam with a capacity of 450,000 acre⋅ft (560,000 dam^{3}). As a primary flood control structure, it would protect 35,000 acres (14,000 ha) of farmland as well as the towns of Oakdale, Riverbank and Ripon from flooding. It would generate electricity using the original 22 megawatt Melones hydroelectric plant. However, the cost-benefit analysis conducted for the project, then known as "New Melones I", did not justify the construction of the dam for flood control alone. If other benefits such as irrigation, fishery conservation and recreation were included, the cost-benefit ratio became positive. The Corps downplayed these additional benefits, intending to keep it primarily as a flood-control structure, because an irrigation project would then fall under the authority of the U.S. Bureau of Reclamation.

During the 1950s the irrigation districts built two more dams, Donnells and Beardsley, along the upper Stanislaus River, forming (along with Tulloch Dam below Melones Dam) the Tri-Dam Project. The Corps objected to the Tri-Dam Project because the additional storage provided by these smaller dams further decreased the potential flood control benefit of New Melones. With the Corps unable to provide a sound economic justification, New Melones I was ultimately shelved in 1954. Meanwhile, the Oakdale and South San Joaquin irrigation districts had conducted their own study in the late 1940s and proposed a bigger dam, 460 feet (140 m) tall with a capacity of 1.1 million acre-feet (1.4 km^{3}), or approximately one year's worth of Stanislaus River runoff.

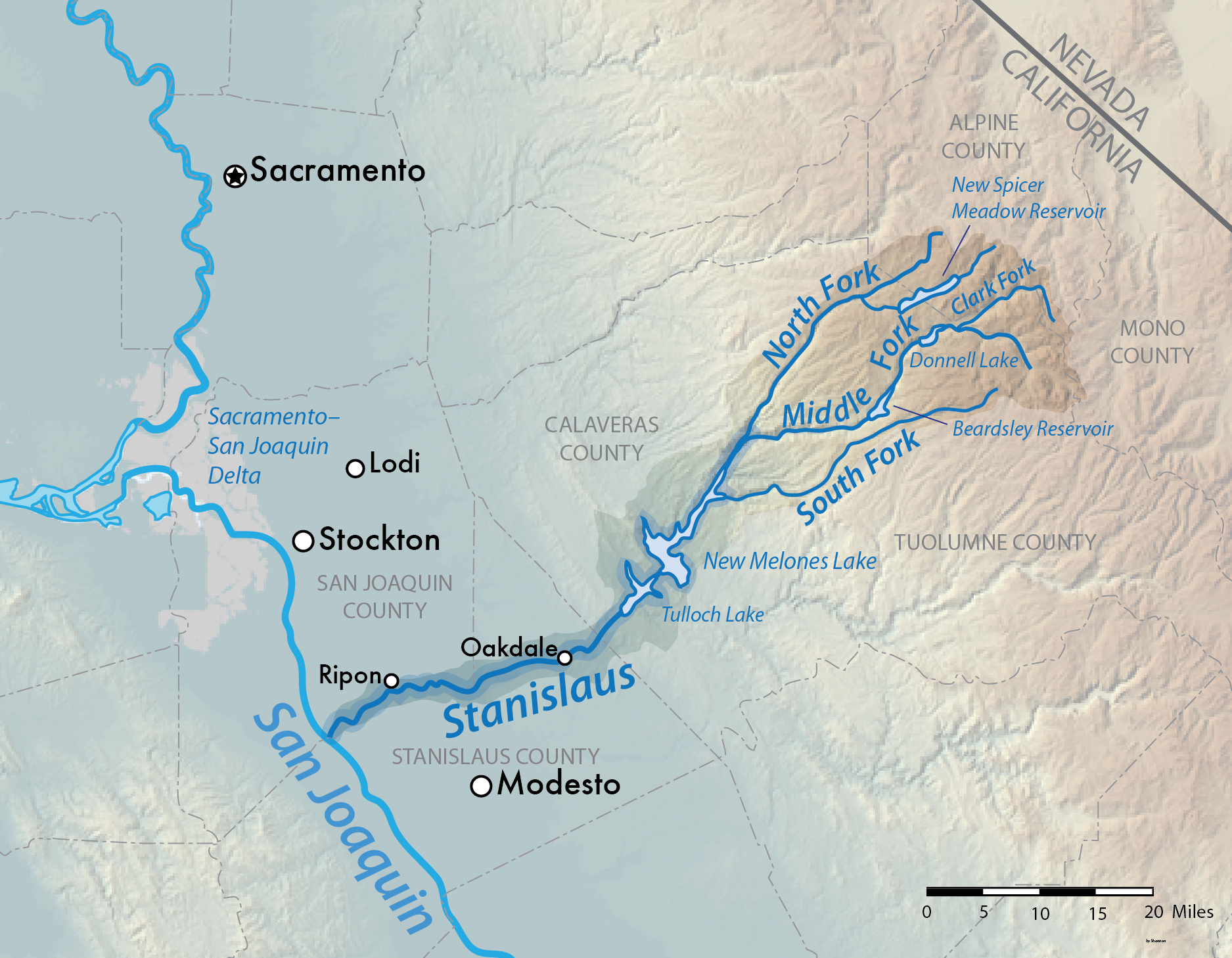
Map of the Stanislaus River watershed, showing today's major dams and reservoirs.

The Bureau of Reclamation first surveyed the Melones dam site in the 1950s, and initially supported the proposed 1.1 million acre foot reservoir but soon increased the size of the project (to be known as "New Melones II") twofold, as part of the Central Valley Project. The Bureau cited numerous benefits to a larger reservoir, which it estimated would capture 335,000 acre-feet (0.413 km^{3}) (Note: The 335,000 acre foot figure refers to the increase in the amount of usable water in the Stanislaus River Basin that would be made possible by a high dam. The water would be captured from storm flows that the existing, smaller reservoirs in the basin did not have the ability to hold.) of extra water per year to increase irrigation, supply other units of the Central Valley Project, and maintain a minimum flow in the Stanislaus River to protect fish (before New Melones was built, diversions often dried the river completely in summer). This water would be provided above and beyond fulfilling previously existing water rights to the irrigation districts.

Although the 1944 version of the project had been abandoned, the Bureau and the Corps continued to argue over who would construct the dam. The Flood Control Act of 1962 authorized the final design of the dam – changing it from an arch to an embankment dam, increasing the size of the projected reservoir to 2,400,000 acre⋅ft (3,000,000 dam^{3}) and requiring the construction of a new power plant. It also settled the interagency dispute by authorizing the Corps to construct the dam and direct flood control operations, and the Bureau to operate the dam for its other intended purposes such as irrigation and hydroelectricity.

In the early 1960s, there was some local opposition to the project on the grounds that it was too big – with a reservoir more than twice as large as the annual flow of the Stanislaus River, it might never fill and would be a waste of federal Central Valley Project funds. There was also concern that water from New Melones II might be exported outside the Stanislaus River basin and sold elsewhere; therefore, a rider attached to the 1962 act "reserved water for use within the basin with export of excess water only". Two years later, the Christmas flood of 1964 caused considerable damage along the Stanislaus River that a large dam could have prevented; Congressman John J. McFall "seized the political leverage that only [the floods] could provide, and urged the drenched farmers to support New Melones Dam." With opposition having largely turned to support, Congress approved funding in 1965, with construction starting the following year.

=== Initial construction and controversy ===
Actual construction began in July 1966 with clearing of the dam and reservoir site, construction of access roads, foundation preparations and excavations for the future outlet works. A diversion tunnel to allow the river to bypass the dam site was excavated between 1966 and December 1973. The Corps opened bids for construction of the main dam on October 10, 1972. Melones Contractors (a consortium formed by Guy F. Atckinson Company, Gordon H. Ball, and Arundel Corp.) won the primary construction contract for $109.7 million, while Allis-Chalmers and General Electric took an $11.5 million contract to provide turbines and hydroelectric generating equipment. During reservoir clearing operations, the USACE spent about $28 million relocating roads and bridges in the future reservoir space. Foundation work for the dam itself began on March 6, 1974 with the first embankment material placed in January 1976. Much of the embankment fill came from an excavation shortly northwest of the dam, which would later serve as the dam's spillway. During the height of construction in the summer, the total workforce reached about 800, while averaging between 500–600 in the winter months.

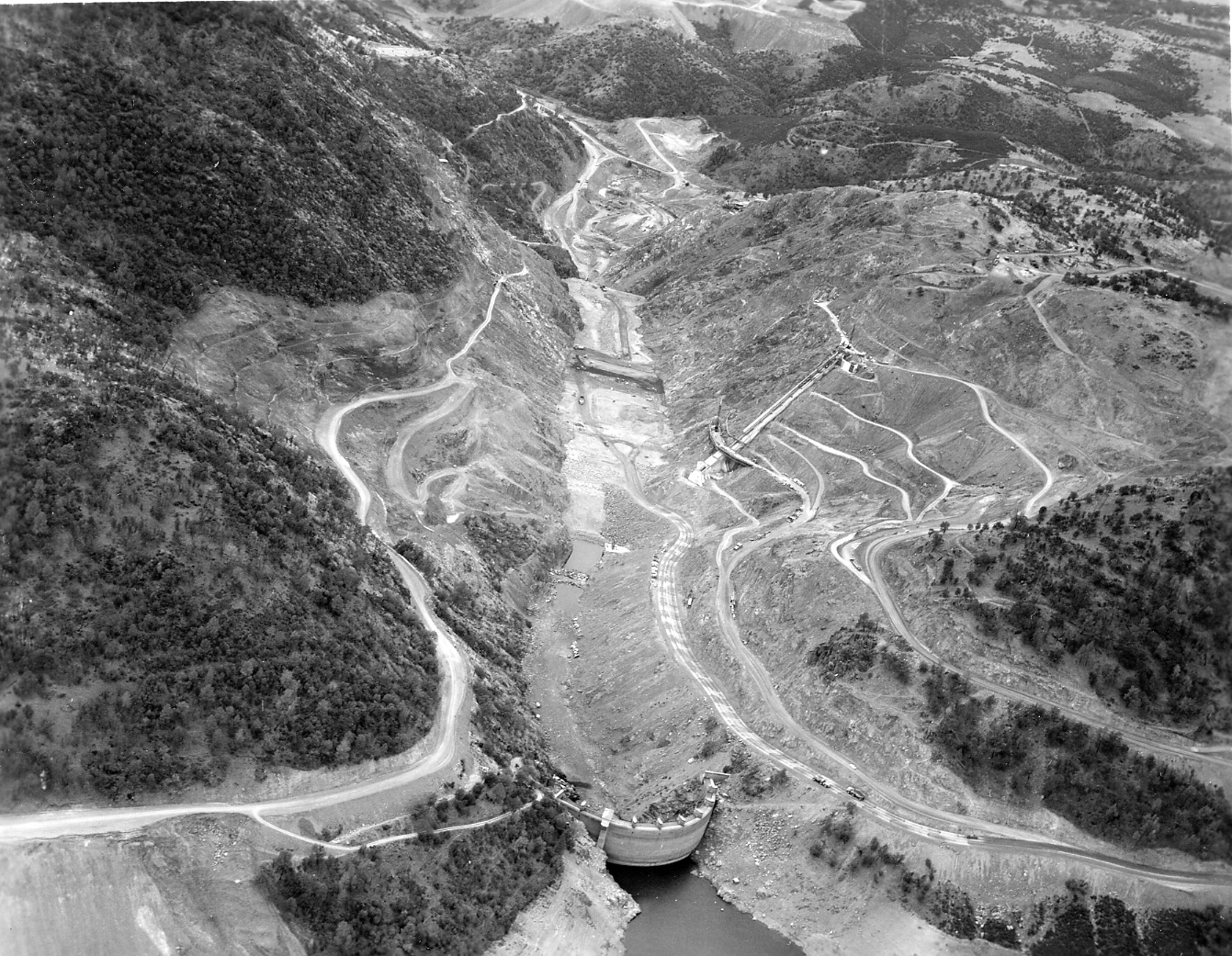
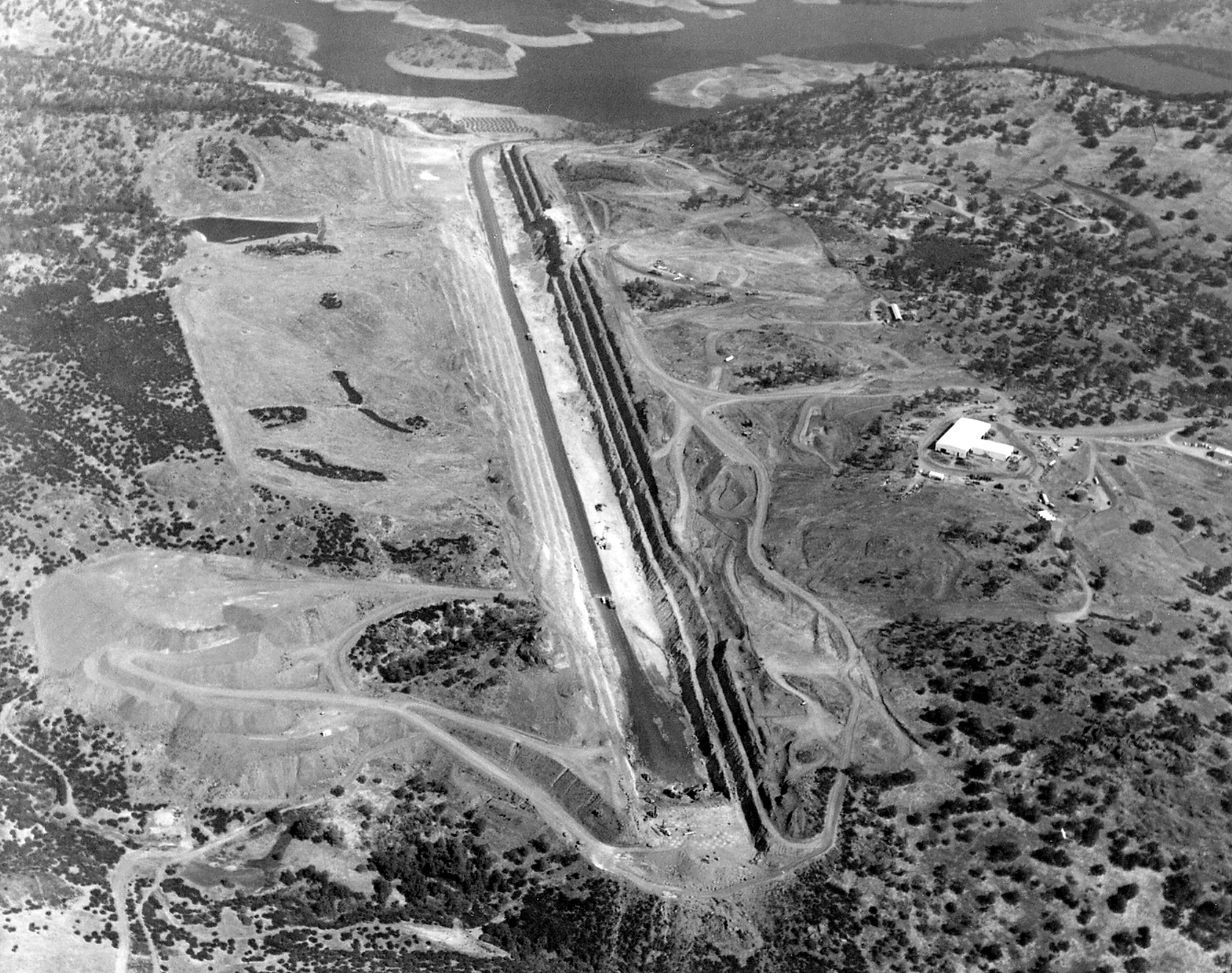
Left: The construction site in September 1976, showing initial excavations; the old Melones Dam is visible below. Right: The spillway channel under construction in 1978.

Although the 1964 floods had initially generated support for New Melones, a spirited opposition to the dam arose from both the river recreation industry and environmentalists who saw the Stanislaus River canyon as having greater value than a reservoir. River runners protested the threat to the Stanislaus River, which was becoming one of the most popular whitewater runs in the United States, with the first commercial rafting company established in 1962 (see images of the river, rafting, and the canyon at the Stanislaus River Archive). The river flowed through the deepest limestone canyon in the US, with cliffs rising 1,000 feet (300 m) above the water in places. Other natural features of the area included extensive limestone caves, and endemic species such as Banksula melones, the Melones cave harvestman. In addition, more than one hundred archaeological and historical sites, left over from Native American inhabitation and the Gold Rush period, were all situated in the reservoir flood zone.

While the US Army Corps of Engineers was constructing New Melones Dam, the dam operators, the US Bureau of Reclamation, applied to the California State Water Resources Control Board (SWRCB) for water rights for the project. During extensive hearings, the Environmental Defense Fund and the Sierra Club recommended that the SWRCB deny the Bureau’s applications for water rights because of the adverse effects of the project and the failure of the Bureau to show that the water sought to be stored will be put to beneficial use within a reasonable time. The Bureau took the position that the SWRCB was limited in its jurisdiction to determining if unappropriated water was available.

On April 4, 1973, the SWRCB issued Decision 1422 which held that the public interest requires the use of the Stanislaus River for whitewater boating, stream fishing and wildlife habitat be protected to the extent that water is not needed for other beneficial purposes. The SWRCB limited impoundment behind New Melones Dam to water needed for fish and wildlife releases, water quality releases, flood control and that needed to satisfy prior water rights at the existing Melones Reservoir. The Board reserved jurisdiction to consider allowing more storage behind New Melones Dam if the Bureau could show that the benefits from the storage outweigh the damage in the watershed above the dam and that the Bureau had firm commitments to deliver the water.

The federal government sued the SWRCB over the storage restrictions contained in Decision 1422. The federal government won at the district and appeals court level, but the US Supreme reversed the lower court decision. In 1978, the US Supreme Court held in California v. United States that under the 1902 Reclamation Act a State may impose any condition on control, appropriation, use or distribution of water in a federal reclamation project that is not inconsistent with clear congressional directives respecting the project. The Court remanded the case to the lower courts to consider the conditions imposed in Decision 1422.

While the administrative and legal battles were occurring, the environmental group Friends of the River (FOR) was formed in the early 1970s to push a statewide ballot measure, Proposition 17, which would have designated 9 miles (14 km) of the Stanislaus River between Stanislaus Powerhouse and Parrott's Ferry as a National Wild and Scenic River and stopped the construction of New Melones Dam. Development-related interests such as PG&E, the California Chamber of Commerce and the contractors working on the dam spent millions of dollars lobbying against Prop 17 (see images on the Stanislaus River Archive). One of their slogans, "Stop the 'Wild River' Hoax!" argued that this part of the Stanislaus River was not untouched wilderness (as dams already existed both upstream and downstream of the 9-mile segment) and therefore was ineligible for Wild and Scenic designation. This statement was misleading, since the language of the Wild and Scenic Rivers Act does not disqualify rivers with dams – only the portions already inundated by reservoirs. (Note: The Wild and Scenic Rivers Act "prohibits federal support for actions such as the construction of dams or other instream activities that would harm the river's free-flowing condition, water quality, or outstanding resource values. However, designation does not affect existing water rights or the existing jurisdiction of states and the federal government over waters as determined by established principles of law" and seeks to "balance dam and other construction at appropriate sections of rivers". Thus, rivers subject to existing water rights and damming on other stretches can still qualify for designation.) Dam supporters also argued that the Stanislaus River in its natural state was only accessible to a small group of people; that the rafting companies held a "monopoly" on river recreation and a reservoir would open up the area for far more tourists than would have visited otherwise, bringing more economic benefits to the area. Proposition 17 lost by a voter margin of 52.5%-47.5%.

Construction on the dam continued to progress. On April 1, 1978 the gates of the diversion tunnel were closed, and New Melones Lake began to fill, soon inundating the old Melones Dam. As the reservoir filled, work moved ahead on the power plant and generating units, which were all completed by the end of 1978. The main embankment of the dam was topped out on October 28, 1978.

=== Protests and filling of the lake ===
On May 22, 1979, Mark Dubois, one of the early leaders of FOR, hiked into the Stanislaus River Canyon and chained himself to a boulder, forcing the Corps to stop filling the lake or risk drowning him. Dubois hid in the canyon for five days while local authorities tried unsuccessfully to find him; he had written letters to the Corps and Governor Jerry Brown telling them of his plans in advance (see documents and images of this event on the Stanislaus River Archive). Ultimately, dam operators opened the gates, halting the rising reservoir at an elevation of 808 feet (246 m), or about 280 feet (85 m) below its maximum design level. The Corps was delayed in handing the project over to the Bureau of Reclamation, as testing could not be completed on the hydroelectric turbines until the water level increased further. On May 29, Governor Brown vetoed Assembly Bill 2164, which would have allowed filling New Melones Lake to its full capacity.

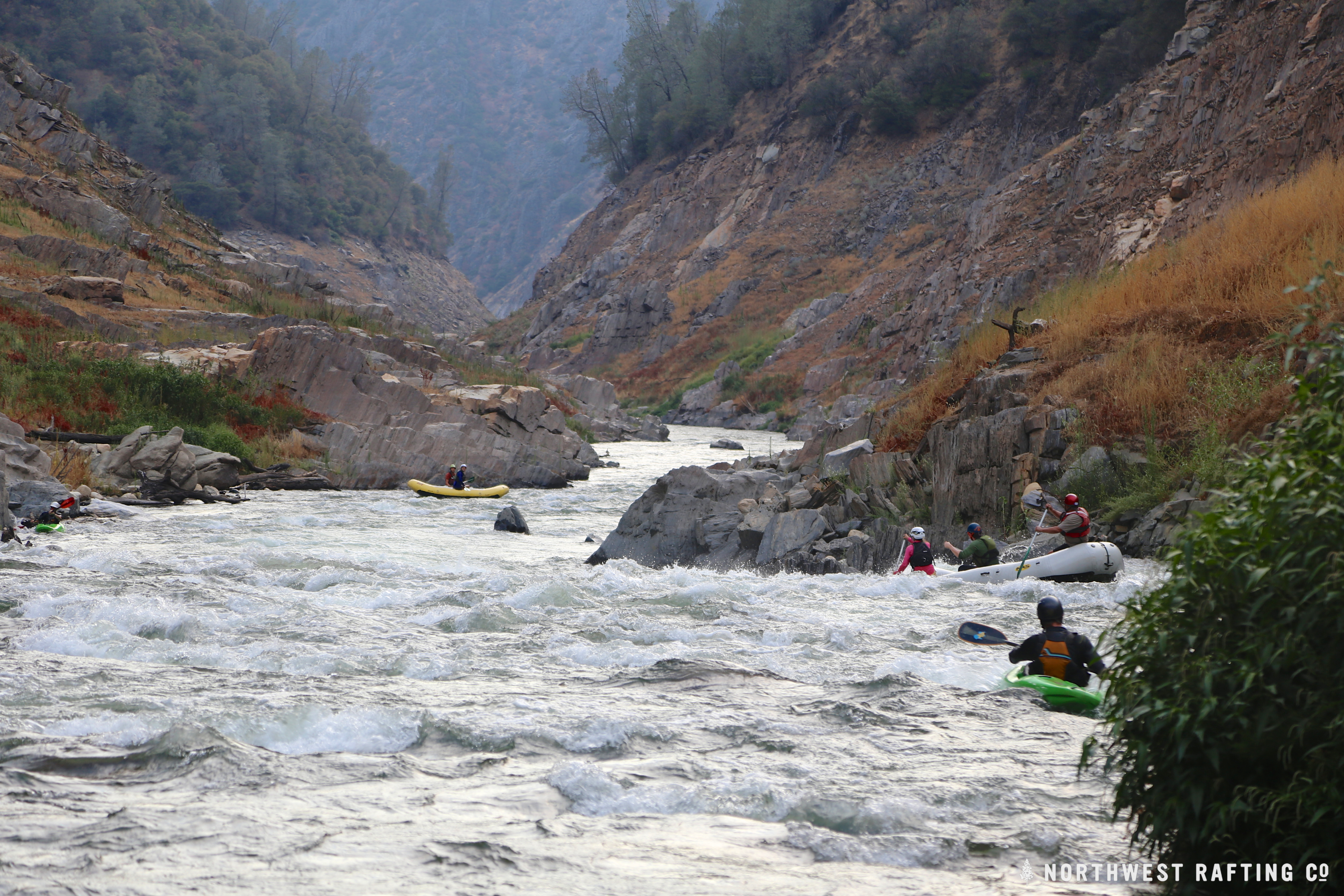
Kayakers in the Stanislaus at Bailey Falls, one of the normally flooded areas above Parrott's Ferry Bridge. This area was briefly exposed during drought in 2014 which lowered the lake level.

In the meantime, environmental groups lobbied for a compromise to stay the lake level at the old Parrott's Ferry Bridge, 844 ft (257 m) above sea level, corresponding to a storage capacity of 438,000 acre⋅ft (540,000 dam^{3}): "We can have a working dam and a wild river." The irrigation districts, Reclamation officials, and local representatives including John Garamendi and Norman S. Waters, argued that to complete the dam only to not fill it was absurd. The state of California initially sided with the opposition. On November 20, 1980 the State Water Resources Control Board set the temporary upper limit for lake level at the old Parrott's Ferry Bridge. With that limit in place, operations of the dam and reservoir were handed to Reclamation.

Over the next two years the state continued to delay allowing the reservoir to fill because the Bureau of Reclamation had not convincingly demonstrated that "the irrigation need will outweigh any damage that results to fish, wildlife and recreation in the watershed above New Melones Dam." Further studies by the California Department of Fish and Wildlife and the Bureau of Reclamation itself showed that completely filling New Melones Lake would, in fact, offset some of the benefits of the project. For example, if additional water were provided for farms, even more water would have to be released into the Stanislaus River to wash out polluted return flows from new irrigation. A larger reservoir would also halt the Stanislaus' spring flooding to such an extent that it would harm the salmon populations that the dam was intended to benefit. Also, a higher reservoir would allow for less flood control space in emergencies. The state determined that the optimal reservoir volume was 623,000 acre-feet (0.768 km^{3}), which would provide enough water to fulfill existing rights and fishery flows as well as provide a hedge against droughts and floods; although it would inundate about 2 miles (3.2 km) of the river above Parrott's Ferry, FOR agreed to this compromise.

Ultimately, it was nature, not political maneuvering, that led to the filling of New Melones Lake. The winter and spring rainy season of 1982 was one of the wettest recorded in the 20th century. The Stanislaus River swelled to such high levels that it exceeded what could be safely released through the dam's outlets, and the reservoir rapidly surpassed the temporary limit. The winter of 1983 was even wetter and pushed water so high that it reached the lip of the emergency spillway (but did not flow over it), a level that has not been surpassed since. With the lake full, the state of California lifted the temporary limit in March, 1983. A deciding factor in the rescinding of the water-level limit was the prevention of $50 million in damages by New Melones Dam in 1982 and 1983, which demonstrated the dam's value for flood control.

== Water rights disputes ==
Low water levels at New Melones, 2012

New Melones Dam has a very large storage capacity relative to the watershed that feeds it, as compared to other major reservoirs in California. The potential water yield, and thus the supply contracts, of the Melones Project were calculated based on stream flow data between 1922 and 1978; however, this period may have been somewhat wetter than the long-term average. The Bureau of Reclamation estimated the additional water yield per year as 335,000 acre-feet (0.413 km^{3}) but the actual yield has been closer to 200,000 acre-feet (0.25 km^{3}). As a result, the reservoir is often at a low water level because in most years demand is greater than supply. In the 38 years between 1978 and 2016, New Melones has only reached capacity five times, and only once (in 1983) has it reached the level of the spillway. Between 1987 and 1992 Reclamation was forced to purchase water from other agencies to fulfill New Melones' water obligations. Even so, the reservoir fell to a record low level of 83,631 acre-feet (103,157,000 m^{3}), 3.5% of capacity, on October 1, 1992. Conversely, the great storage capacity also means that New Melones can capture more flood runoff while other major California reservoirs must release it to maintain flood control space.

The original contracted water supply from New Melones Dam was 1,067,000 acre-feet (1.316 km^{3}), of which 600,000 acre-feet (0.74 km^{3}) was allocated to the Oakdale and South San Joaquin Irrigation Districts (who owned the original Melones Dam and have the oldest water rights); 422,000 acre-feet (0.521 km^{3}) for Stanislaus River water quality and fishery conservation; and 45,000 acre-feet (0.056 km^{3}) for the Stockton East Water District. Originally, Reclamation had planned to extend the water supply to other users, but even from the start, the Melones Project was barely able to meet these existing targets. New Melones releases are important for regional groundwater recharge, a vital water source for farmers when surface water supplies are cut off due to drought, and to protect water quality in the Stanislaus and San Joaquin Rivers by diluting pollutants during the late summer and fall dry season.

=== Fishery flows ===
After the Central Valley Project Improvement Act in 1991 and the Bay-Delta Water Quality Control Plan in 1995, much more water was required to meet target environmental flows in the Stanislaus and San Joaquin Rivers and the Delta, which conflicts with the original language of the 1962 act authorizing the dam, which stated that only "excess water" could be appropriated for these uses. One of the new requirements was for spring and autumn "pulse flows" intended to help migration of anadromous fish (Chinook salmon and steelhead trout in particular). This policy has been criticized by local irrigation districts as a waste of water during dry years, as fish populations have continued to struggle despite the additional flows. Reclamation officials argue that the flows are needed to meet state and federal requirements, as well as the earlier Endangered Species Act of 1972. As a result, the Melones Project is now only able to meet all its contracts in above average water years. Local water users have coined the somewhat derisive nickname of "green dam" because the policy has shifted to favor fish rather than farmers.

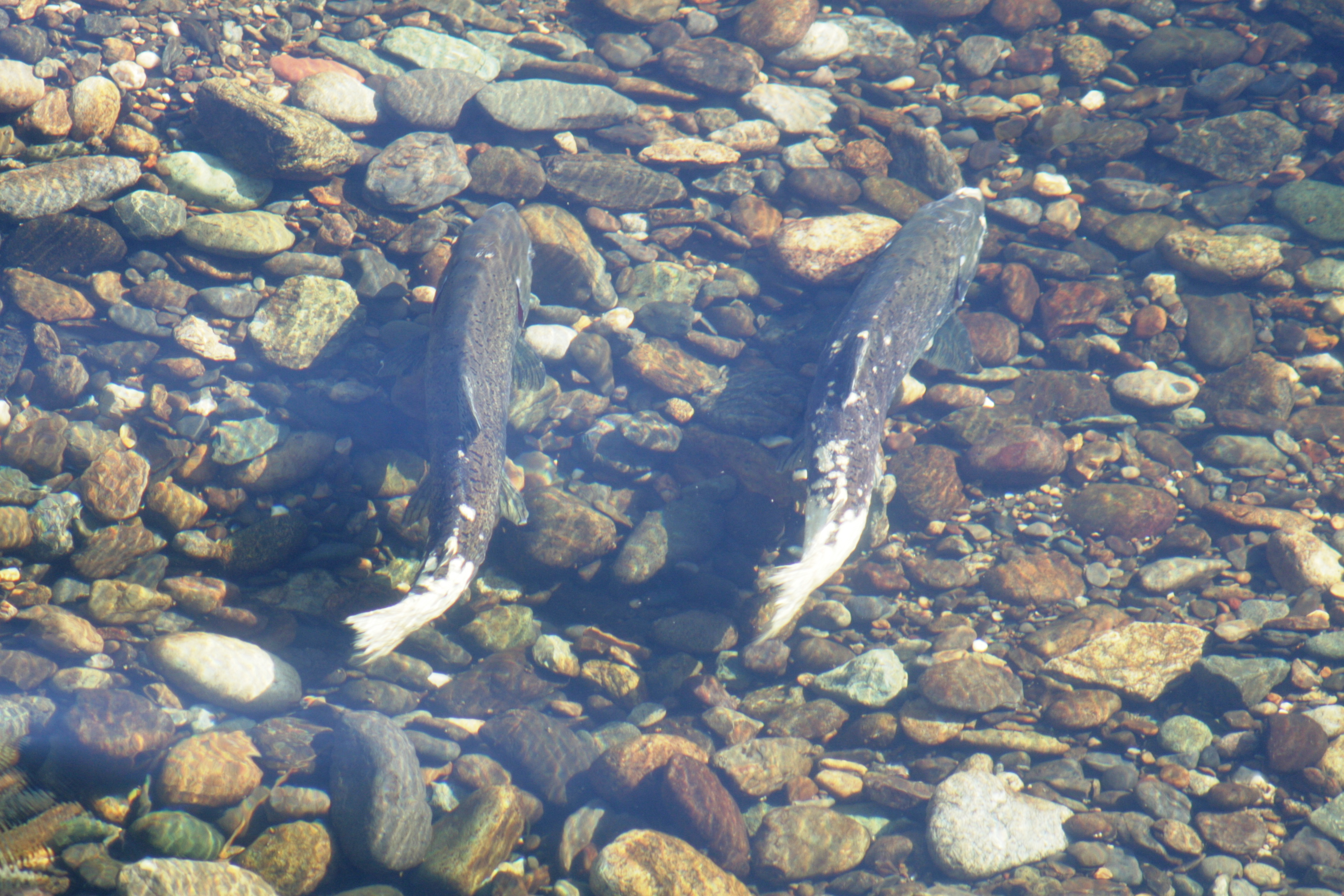
A pair of Chinook salmon in the Stanislaus River

A further constraint is that water released in autumn must be cold enough for anadromous fish to survive, and thus must be made from the lower level outlets at New Melones Dam. However, the old Melones Dam was not demolished during the construction of the new dam (the original dam remains submerged far below the reservoir surface, only rarely re-emerging when the water level is low). The old dam partially blocks the movement of cold water from the deepest parts of the reservoir, causing warmer surface water to be drawn out instead. As a result, in certain years the amount of irrigation water has been reduced in order to maintain enough depth in New Melones Lake in the fall to preserve the cold water pool.

A 2016 study by independent environmental consulting group FishBio showed that the artificial spring pulse flows from New Melones Dam do fairly little to support salmon and steelhead out-migration in the Stanislaus River. Rather, the fish take their cues from increased water flow due to rainfall, as they naturally would have before the many dams on the Stanislaus River were built. In the spring of 2016 about 12,500 juvenile salmon migrated downriver to the sea during April and May, but less than 1 percent migrated during the pulse flow. In years of drought when the lake level is low, releasing water during the spring creates consequences later in the year – because there is not enough cold water left for the autumn spawning run.

The state of California has further proposed that between 20 and 60 percent of the unimpaired, or natural flow of the Stanislaus River be allowed to run downstream during the spring to support ailing fish populations. In addition, the minimum level of New Melones Lake would be set at 700,000 acre-feet (0.86 km^{3}) (29 percent capacity) at all times in order to preserve the cold water pool. This would essentially limit the usable storage in the reservoir to the 1,250,000 acre-feet (1.54 km^{3}) between the cold water pool and the flood-control pool, further handicapping the ability of the reservoir to manage water. This plan has been met with outcry from local cities and irrigation districts, which contend that it would heavily damage the farming economy and cause thousands of seasonal jobs to disappear. Furthermore, it does not address other major problems including introduced striped bass in the San Joaquin River, which eat many if not most of the juvenile salmon and steelhead before they even reach the sea.

=== Conflict and compromise ===
In 2015, Congressman Tom McClintock introduced HR 1668, the "Save Our Water Act", which "amends the Endangered Species Act of 1973 (ESA) to suspend during droughts the application of the ESA to water releases from water storage facilities by federal and state agencies in a navigable river basin." McClintock specifically cited the release of 30,000 acre-feet (37,000,000 m^{3}) from New Melones Lake over several weeks in spring 2015, when New Melones Lake was approaching its lowest level on record since the 1992 drought. That year, very few fish had returned to the Stanislaus to spawn; in an editorial for MyMotherLode, Mark Truppner wrote: "Biologists estimate that it will affect the offspring of about 29 steelhead trout in the Stanislaus River – a few hundred smolts [sic] almost all of which will be eaten by predators long before they reach the ocean. And that assumes they won't swim toward the ocean on their own – as they have been doing without our helpful assistance since time immemorial." However the bill did not pass.

One potential solution has been outlined in a 2016 agreement between the Bureau of Reclamation, the local water districts and a number of other state and federal agencies. The local water districts would provide 75,000 acre-feet (93,000,000 m^{3}) of water for fishery flows during the spring; this water would be sold to the San Luis & Delta-Mendota Water Authority. Instead of draining into the ocean, it would be captured by the large Central Valley Project and State Water Project pumping stations in the Delta for eventual re-use on Authority lands. Previously, Reclamation had been taking the Stanislaus irrigation districts' water without paying for it. Essentially, the agreement allows for the water to be re-used for agriculture while still maintaining fishery flows in the Stanislaus River.

== Legacy ==
The controversy over New Melones Dam was one of the most heated environmental disputes in the U.S. at the time. The dam was constructed at a time of growing public support for environmental preservation, as compared to development or utilitarian conservation of natural resources. Friends of the River describes the campaign against the dam as "probably the biggest citizen effort to save a river and stop a dam in American history." The Bureau of Reclamation itself has called New Melones "a case study of all that can go wrong with a project." Although opponents of the dam were ultimately unsuccessful, the campaign greatly strengthened the political power of the river conservation movement in California and the rest of the United States; in California, a number of later dam projects were defeated by citizen opposition, including a hydroelectric project on the nearby Tuolumne River which was canceled less than two years after New Melones Dam was completed.

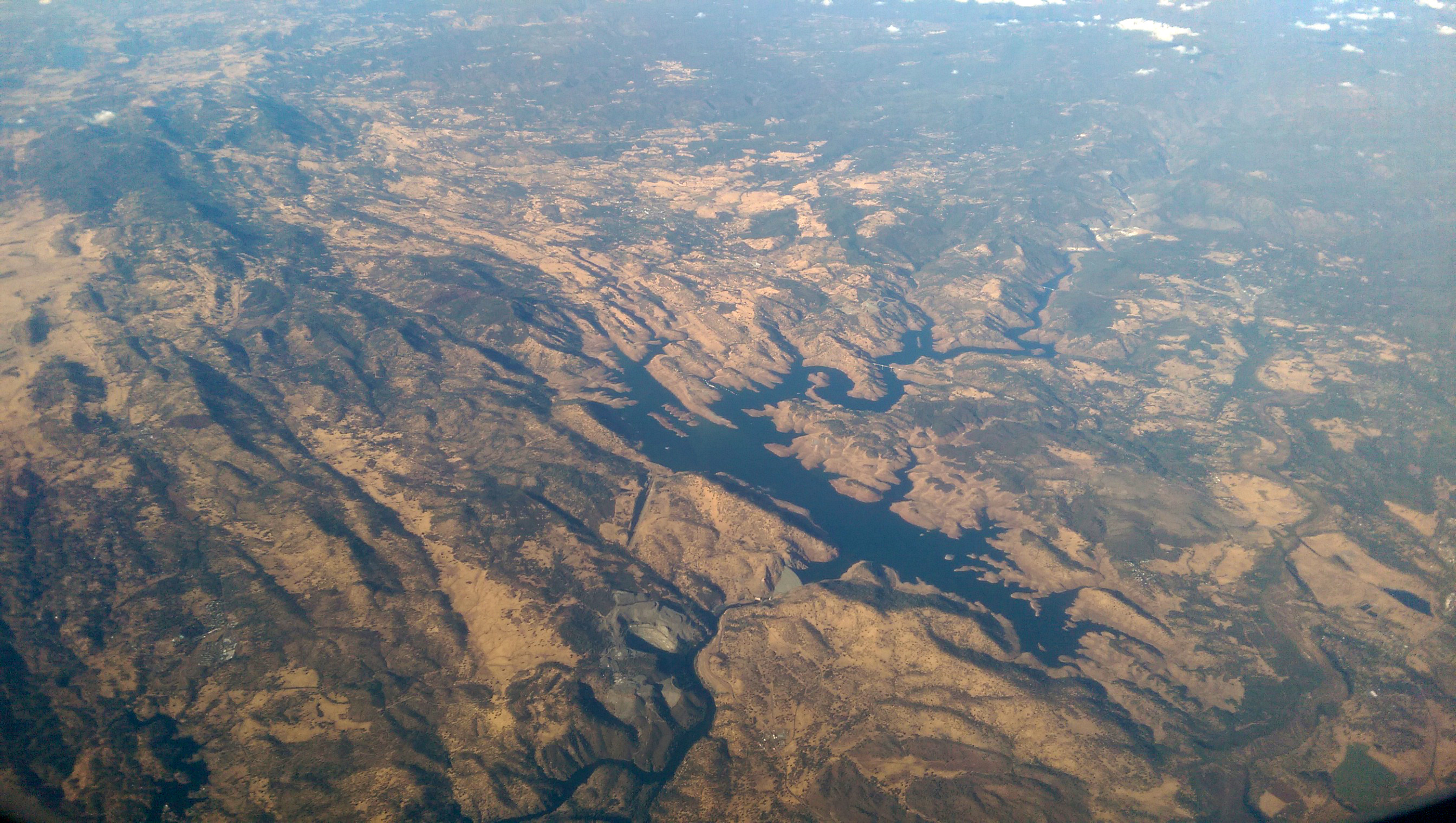
Aerial view of New Melones Dam (lower center) and Lake, looking northeast

In Dam Politics: Restoring America's Rivers, William R. Lowry writes:

The New Melones Dam was one of the last of its kind. Although proclamations that dam building no longer occurs in the United States are not completely true, it is true that no structure as large or as significant has since been built on an American river. And since this date, virtually no structural modification to a river in this country has gone unopposed.

The New Melones debate influenced the eventual protection of a number of other northern California rivers (the Eel, Klamath and others) under the National Wild and Scenic Rivers System starting in 1980. It considerably changed the California state government's approach to water resources development, switching focus from massive dam projects to conservation and policy improvements. In 1982, the same year that New Melones Lake filled, the Reclamation Reform Act set more stringent standards for vetting federal Reclamation projects, essentially "distancing federal policy from the 'dams-everywhere' approach of the past." However, the relative lack of new storage has severely strained California's water system, which now serves 15 million more people than it did when New Melones Dam was completed in 1979.

In a history of the dam written in 1994 as part of the Bureau of Reclamation History Program, Joe Simonds came to this conclusion:

The New Melones Dam stands as a reminder of the conflicts surrounding growth, the environment, and water in the West. The Corps built it at the end of the era of large dam construction. Even without the environmental controversy that surrounds the project, the operational and water yield problems will certainly cause continued difficulties well into the future. With the enormity of the problems facing New Melones, it seems unlikely that the project will ever realize its full potential as a multi use unit. Indeed, new Melones may become a case study of all that can go wrong with a project.

== See also ==
- California State Water Project
- List of United States Bureau of Reclamation dams
- List of dams and reservoirs in California
- List of largest reservoirs of California
- List of power stations in California
- List of the tallest dams in the United States
- Tulloch Dam

== Works cited ==
- Hundley, Norris (2001). The Great Thirst: Californians and Water—A History. University of California Press. ISBN 0-52092-529-7.
- Lowry, William Robert (2003). Dam Politics: Restoring America's Rivers. Georgetown University Press. ISBN 0-87840-390-6.
- Mooney, Harold; Zavaleta, Erika (2016). Ecosystems of California. University of California Press. ISBN 9780520962170.
- Palmer, Tim (1984). Stanislaus: The Struggle for a River. University of California Press. ISBN 0-52005-225-0.
- Palmer, Tim (1993). Wild and Scenic Rivers of America. Island Press. p. 37. ISBN 1-55963-145-7.
- Palmer, Tim (2004). Lifelines: The Case for River Conservation. Rowman & Littlefield. ISBN 0-74253-139-2.
