= Tulloch Dam =

Dam in California, United States

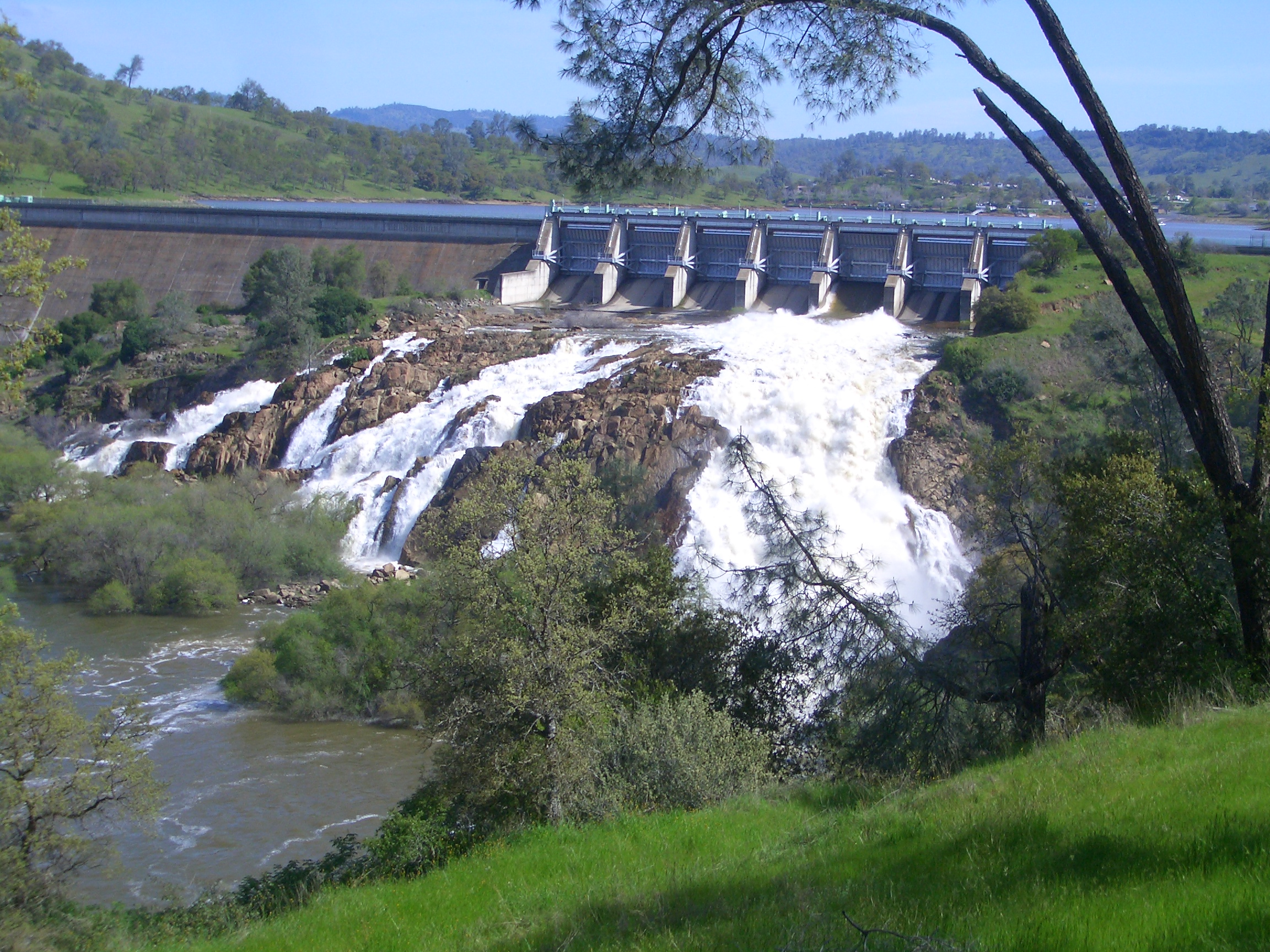
- Overflow in April 2006
- Interactive map of Tulloch Dam
- Country: United States
- Location: Calaveras / Tuolumne counties, California
- Coordinates: 37°52′35″N 120°36′18″W
- Opening date: 1958; 68 years ago

Dam and spillways
- Type of dam: Concrete gravity
- Impounds: Stanislaus River
- Height: 205 ft (62 m)
- Length: 1,914 ft (583 m)

Reservoir
- Creates: Lake Tulloch
- Total capacity: 68,400 acre⋅ft (84,400,000 m^{3})
- Active capacity: 67,000 acre⋅ft (83,000,000 m^{3})
- Catchment area: 980 mi^{2} (2,500 km^{2})
- Surface area: 1,280 acres (520 ha)
- Normal elevation: 510 ft (160 m)

Power Station
- Turbines: 2x vertical Francis
- Installed capacity: 18 MW
- Annual generation: 93 million KWh

Tulloch Dam is a hydroelectric dam on the Stanislaus River in central California. The dam is part of the Stanislaus River Tri-Dam project cooperatively owned by the Oakdale and South San Joaquin Irrigation Districts, and was completed in 1958. It serves mainly for irrigation purposes but also has a power station with a capacity of 18 megawatts. The dam is located just downstream of the New Melones Dam and upstream of the Goodwin Dam.

== See also ==
- Beardsley Dam
- Donnells Dam
- List of dams and reservoirs in California
- List of lakes in California
