= Mark Dubois =

American environmental activist

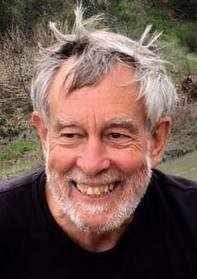
- Mark Dubois, in 2016.
- Born: February 24, 1949 (age 76); Sacramento
- Occupation: Environmental Activist
- Spouse: Clare Dubois

Mark Dubois (born February 24, 1949) began as an environmental activist, initially focusing on saving rivers and has worked to mobilize and engage citizens globally for a vibrant future. In 1972 he co-founded Environmental Traveling Companions (E.T.C.) to offer environmental education and Outward Bound-type trips to disabled persons and disadvantaged youth. In 1973, he co-founded Friends of the River to fight the flooding of the Stanislaus River and canyon by the New Melones Dam. He reached national fame when he chained himself to a rock on the banks of the river to prevent the flooding of the river. He also co-founded International Rivers in 1984, and served as the International Coordinator of Earth Day 1990 and 2000. His personal papers from these organizations and other work from 1970–2002 are held by the Bancroft Library at the University of California, Berkeley.

== Biography ==
=== Early life ===
Mark Dubois was born in Sacramento February 24, 1949, and in his teen and adult years rafted and explored the Stanislaus River canyon. Being a canyon made of limestone, exploring caves was a significant part of his initial experiences there. At the time, he was only dimly aware that the US Army Corps of Engineers was working on a dam that would eventually flood the river canyon he was falling in love with.

=== Environmental Traveling Companions (ETC) ===
In 1972, Dubois co-founded (with Fred Dennis) Environmental Traveling Companions (ETC or "etcetera") to introduce inner city kids to nature through rafting. The organization continues today with the same mission.

=== Friends of the River ===
Friends of the River was born in 1973 from the effort to put an initiative on the California ballot to save the river, led by Jerry Meral and Mark Dubois, among others. Although the initiative failed, the act of working to pass it brought together enough individual effort to create the foundation of an organization (some 30,000 volunteers gathered half a million signatures to qualify the initiative). By 1980 FOR had 3,000 members.

=== International Rivers Network ===
In 1984, Dubois co-founded the International Rivers Network (now called "International Rivers") after a year-long trip around the world. The group aims to encourage grassroots organizing against large dam projects, and redirecting international funding away from such projects.

=== Earth Day 1990 ===
Dubois and Teresa McGlashan were the International Coordinators for Earth Day’s global efforts, coordinating with grassroots groups along with some government and business organizations in the 143 participating countries outside the US. An estimated 200 million citizens participated in Earth Day and Earth Week events around the world. 200 million people in 140 countries participated in the event that year.

== Philosophical and/or political views ==
Dubois advocates “heart politics.” Similar to Gandhi’s appeal to our better nature, Dubois notes that individuals respond better to encouragement and appeals to their conscience. He tries to help transform anger into constructive action, and believes that by having fun doing it means that success is more likely. A good background on his philosophy and its roots can be found in his essay "Dancing with the River" in the book Consciousness in Action by Andrew Beath.

== Honors, decorations, awards and distinctions ==
Dubois gained national attention when he chained himself to a rock beside the rising reservoir behind New Melones Dam in May 1979 to force the Army Corps of Engineers to stop the filling or kill him. He was at least temporarily successful, as they stopped filling the dam and he came out of hiding.

== See also ==
List related internal (Wikipedia) articles in alphabetical order. Common nouns are listed first. Proper nouns follow.

- Earth Day
- Friends of the River
- New Melones Dam
- Stanislaus River
