= Friends of the River =

US non-profit organization

- Founded: 1973
- Founder: Jerry Meral and Mark Dubois
- Purpose: "Friends of the River protects and restores California Rivers by influencing public policy and inspiring citizen action."
- Location: Sacramento, California
- Region served: California
- Members: Nearly 6,000
- Key people: Jann Dorman executive director
- Revenue: $336,000
- Employees: 12
- Website: friendsoftheriver.org

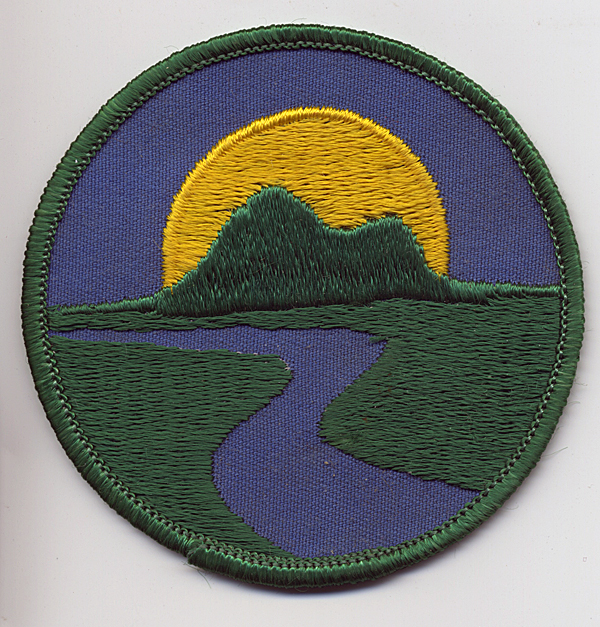
FOR early logo patch

Friends of the River was founded in 1973 by Mark Dubois and Jerry Meral during the struggle to save the Stanislaus River from New Melones Dam. Some believe that the campaign to save the Stanislaus River marked the end of massive dam building in the United States, making the Stanislaus River the "last river lost". Many photographs, documents, and other materials relating to this failed campaign are available online at the Stanislaus River Digital Archive.

Following that campaign, the group branched out to work to protect other California rivers. The mission of Friends of the River is to preserve and restore California's rivers, streams, and their watersheds; as well as to advocate for sustainable water management.

Today, Friends of the River, a 501(c)(3) organization, has nearly 6,000 members, 12 staff members, and a 12-member Board of Directors. The organization's 2009 budget was $1.06 million. The organization's flagship publication, Headwaters, is published bi-annually, and has a distribution of 6,000. Friends of the River is based in Sacramento with field offices in Monterey and Valencia.

In 2005, Friends of the River joined with the Sierra Club and the South Yuba River Citizens League to file a motion with the Federal Energy Regulatory Commission (FERC) to require the managers of Oroville Dam in California to lay concrete on the emergency spillway. The motion was rejected, and approximately 12 years later the emergency spillway was used and began to erode, threatening the dam with potential collapse. Oroville and the surrounding area were evacuated.

== Evaluations ==
Charity Navigator gives the organization four stars out of four for accountability and transparency and three out of four stars overall. In fiscal year ending December 2014, the organization spent 69.5% of its revenue on program expenses, 13.9% on administrative expenses, and 16.6% on fundraising expenses.
