= South San Joaquin Irrigation District =

Coordinates: 37.7983°N 121.1735°W

The South San Joaquin Irrigation District (SSJID), located in Southern San Joaquin County, California, is a non-profit utility that provides irrigation water and domestic water in the Central Valley of California along with hydroelectric power.

SSJID was established in 1909 to provide irrigation water for 72,000 acres of agricultural area surrounding Escalon, Ripon, and Manteca, California. In 2005, it started providing domestic water service to South San Joaquin County cities with its membrane filtration water treatment plant.

SSJID’s historic water rights allow for several hydroelectric power plants on a series of dams and reservoirs on the Stanislaus River. SSJID and Oakdale Irrigation District completed the original Melones Reservoir in 1926. Since 1957, the two agencies have co-owned the Tri-Dam Project, consisting of Donnells Dam, Beardsley Dam, and Tulloch Dam reservoirs and powerhouses.

== Solar farm ==
On July 18, 2008, SSJID completed a 1.4 megawatt solar farm that provides nearly all of the electricity to run its water treatment plant, It is a single-axis solar tracking system featuring thin-film photovoltaic cells. The system that SSJID adopted works to actually track and follow the sun, turning on its central axis for optimum exposure to the sun. “Photovoltaic” means that the sunlight is converted directly to electricity. Conversion rates vary around 15% but by using solar tracking, it is estimated to increase efficiency by 30-40%.

“The project’s main goal was to stabilize electrical costs, which can spike substantially in summer months given local time of use (TOU) metering,” said SSJID Utility Systems Director Don Battles.

== Irrigation system ==
Over 100 years ago, SSJID and the Oakland Irrigation District secured water rights on the Stanislaus River . Since then, SSJID has created a system to deliver water for agricultural and urban users as well as to generate hydroelectric power.

SSJID updates and maintains its extensive irrigation system during the winter season, shortly after the area's almond harvest concludes each year in October. It is also building a pressurized pipeline system to augment open irrigation canals in the southwest corner of the district south of Manteca. The aim is to reduce the pumping of ground water that has a growing salinity problem, reduce evaporation, cut the use of energy and air pollution, while giving farmers the ability to precisely apply water and nutrients through pressurized drip irrigation systems.

== Purchase of PG&E electric facilities ==
In the early 2000's, SSJID proposed the purchase of Pacific Gas & Electric (PG&E) electric facilities in Manteca, Ripon, Escalon and surrounding farm land. The San Joaquin Local Agency Formation Commission (LAFCo), requested the approval of the California Public Utilities Commission (CPUC) Its resolution would be part of the LAFCo review process .

In 2009, the California Public Utilities Commission (CPUC) unanimously approved a resolution finding that the proposed purchase would not significantly impact the remaining PG&E electric ratepayers.

In 2013, the San Joaquin LAFCO asked for another study citing that the other studies were obsolete. On December 11, 2014, the LAFCO met in Stockton, California and approved SSJID's proposal, Negotiations were then held on the purchase the equipment from PG&E
