= Donnells Dam =

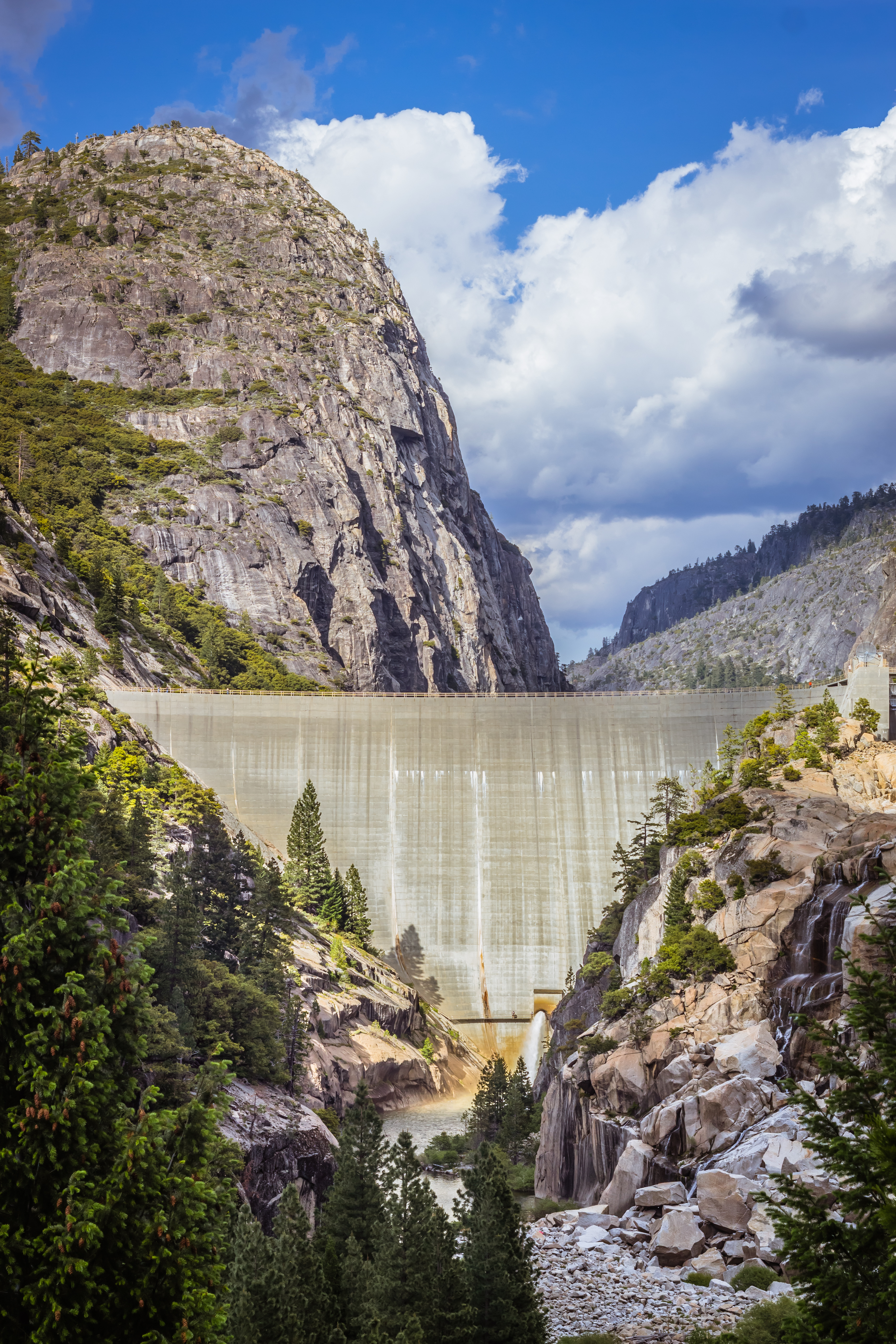

- Location in California
- Official name: Donnells 62-005 Dam
- Country: United States
- Location: Tuolumne County, California
- Coordinates: 38°19′48″N 119°57′46″W
- Opening date: 1958; 68 years ago
- Owner: Tri-Dam Project

Dam and spillways
- Type of dam: Concrete arch
- Impounds: Middle Fork, Stanislaus River
- Height: 291 feet (89 m)
- Length: 714 feet (218 m)
- Elevation at crest: 4,921.8 feet (1,500.2 m)

Reservoir
- Creates: Donnell Lake
- Total capacity: 56,893 acre-feet (70,176,000 m^{3})
- Catchment area: 229 square miles (590 km^{2})
- Surface area: 401 acres (162 ha)

Power Station
- Installed capacity: 72 MW
- Annual generation: 270,234,000 KWh (2001–2012)

Donnells Dam (National ID # CA00264) is a concrete arch dam located on the Middle Fork of the Stanislaus River in Tuolumne County, California. The water impounded by the 291-foot (89 m) high dam forms Donnell Lake in Stanislaus National Forest. The dam and reservoir are co-owned by the Oakdale Irrigation District and South San Joaquin Irrigation District, and the dam is one of three in the Tri-Dam Project. The other two dams in the project are Beardsley Dam and Tulloch Dam.

The dam has a length of 750 feet (230 m) at its crest and a storage capacity of 56,893 acre-feet (70,176,000 m^{3}). Donnells Reservoir, along with the two other dams of that make up the Tri-Dam Project, currently provide water for the irrigation of about 117,500 acres (47,600 ha) of farmland in Stanislaus and San Joaquin counties. The reservoir also generates hydroelectric power and supplies water to urban areas.

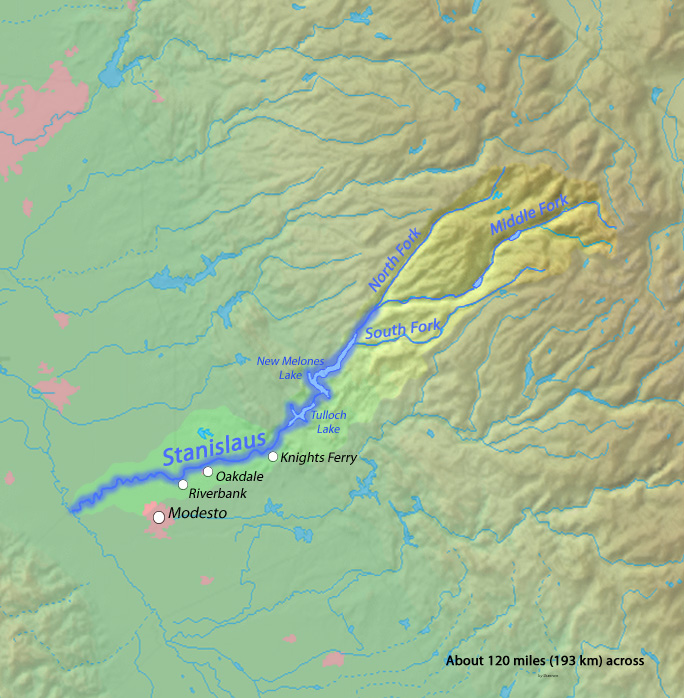
Map of the Stanislaus River

== History ==
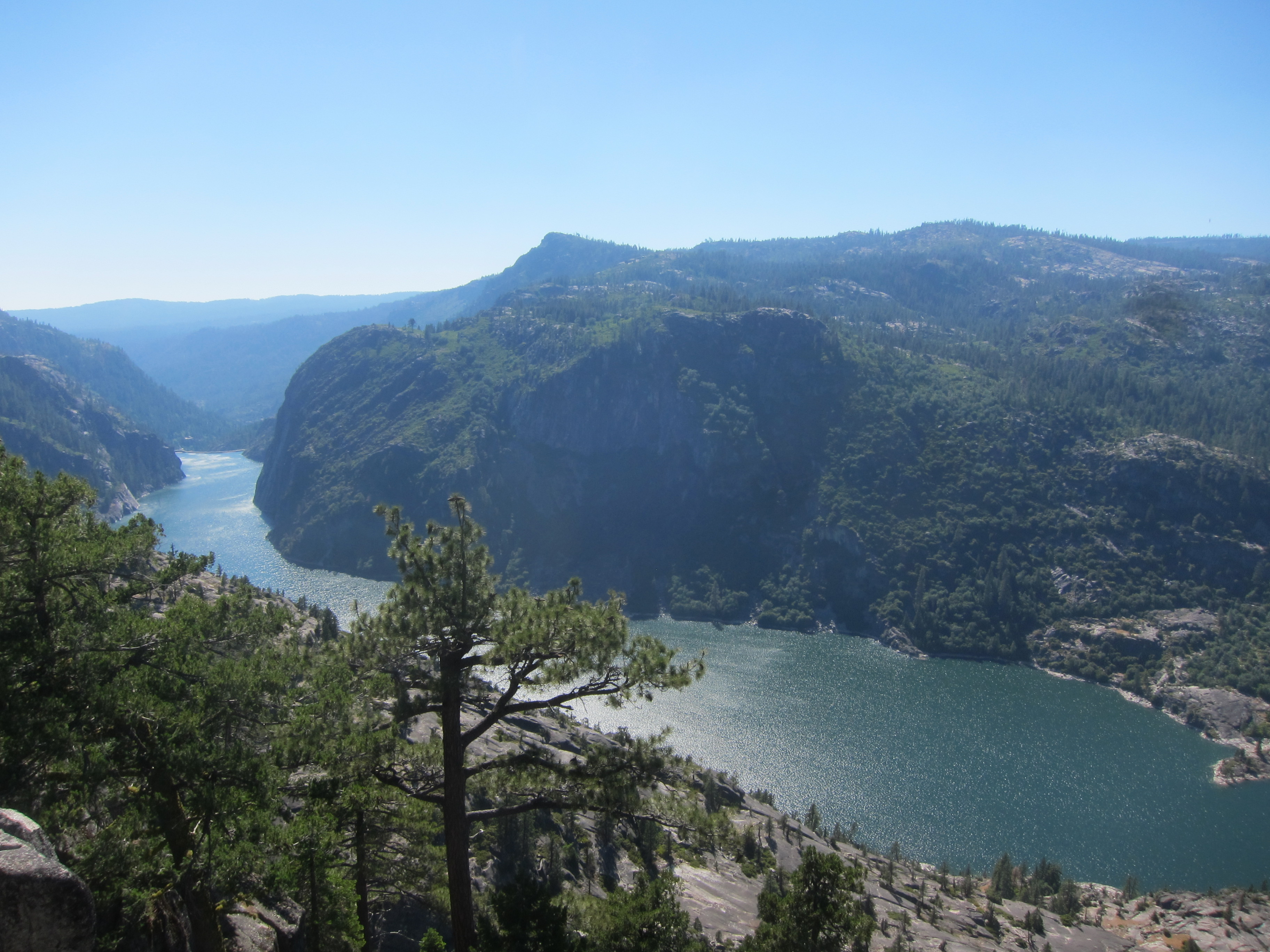
View of Donnell Lake from Highway 108. The dam is on the left end of the lake.

The Oakdale Irrigation District (OID) and South San Joaquin Irrigation District (SSJID) joined forces in the late 1930s to design the Tri-Dam Project in an effort to satisfy the need for more water for irrigation, as both of the districts’ existing infrastructure was insufficient to meet the growing demand for water. On January 13, 1948, the districts publicly announced their intent to develop the Tri-Dam Project, which consists of a series of dams, reservoirs and power plants at the current sites of Beardsley, Tulloch and Donnell reservoirs on Middle Fork of the Stanislaus River, as well as improvements to older developments.

Over the next eight years, the districts battled a series of financial setbacks and conflicting claims to the sites where they desired to build the dams. For instance, the Tuolumne County Water District had a prior application for the Donnells site. In 1953, the conflict over water rights was settled with the irrigation districts receiving the water rights. As part of the agreement, Donnells and Beardsley reservoirs had to be used for power generation except in the case that water had to be released to enhance downstream flows. After the rights claims issues were resolved, the districts set out to find funding for the project and, after much difficulty, settled on selling bonds. The OID and SSJID, with the help of Pacific Gas and Electric Company (PG&E), successfully sold bonds to fund the Tri-Dam Project and started construction of the dams in 1955. The districts paid off the bonds by entering into a contract with PG&E in which the OID and SSJID sold the electricity generated by the dams’ hydropower facilities to PG&E over a fifty-year period; the contract ended in 2004.

== Uses ==
Donnells Dam, along with the other two dams, has become a key producer of electricity. Additionally, the dam is located in a steep, rocky canyon and offers several forms of recreation, including fishing, hunting, boating, camping and hiking.

== See also ==
- List of dams and reservoirs in California
