= Beardsley Dam =

Dam in Tuolumne County, California

Coordinates: 38°12′15″N 120°04′28″W

- Interactive map of Beardsley Dam
- Country: United States
- Location: Tuolumne County, California.
- Status: Operational
- Opening date: 1957

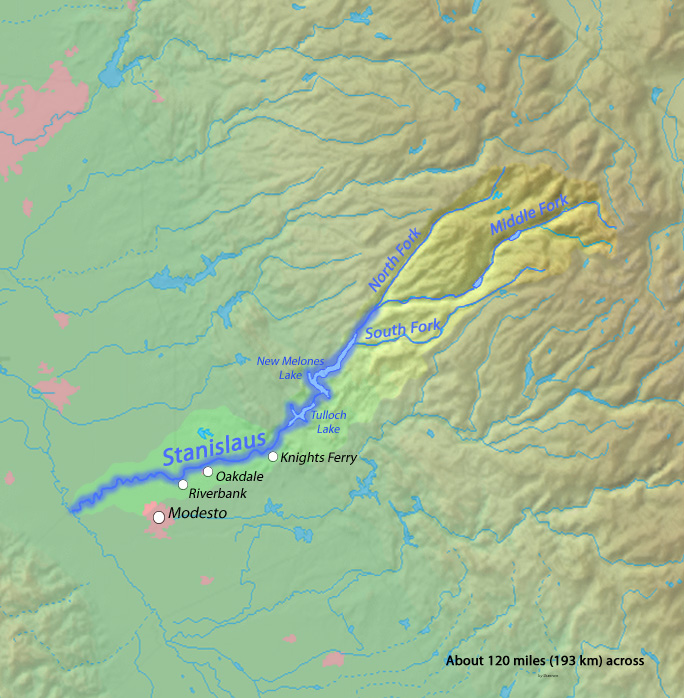
Map of the Stanislaus River

Beardsley Dam (National ID # CA00263) is a dam on the Middle Fork Stanislaus River in Tuolumne County, California. The site is surrounded by the Stanislaus National Forest.

== Water and power ==
The earthen dam was completed in 1957 (69 years ago) with a height of 284 feet (87 m), and a length of 1,000 feet (300 m) at its crest. It impounds the Middle Fork of the Stanislaus River for hydroelectric power and irrigation water storage, part of the Stanislaus River Tri-Dam project cooperatively owned by the Oakdale Irrigation District and South San Joaquin Irrigation District.

The reservoir it creates, Beardsley Lake, has a water surface of 1.1 square miles, a maximum capacity of 97,800 acre-feet (120,600,000 m^{3}), and a normal capacity of 97,500 acre-feet (120,300,000 m^{3}). Recreation includes camping, fishing, and boating.

== See also ==
- Donnells Dam
- Tulloch Dam
- List of dams and reservoirs in California
- Stanislaus River topics
