= Gibraltar Dam =

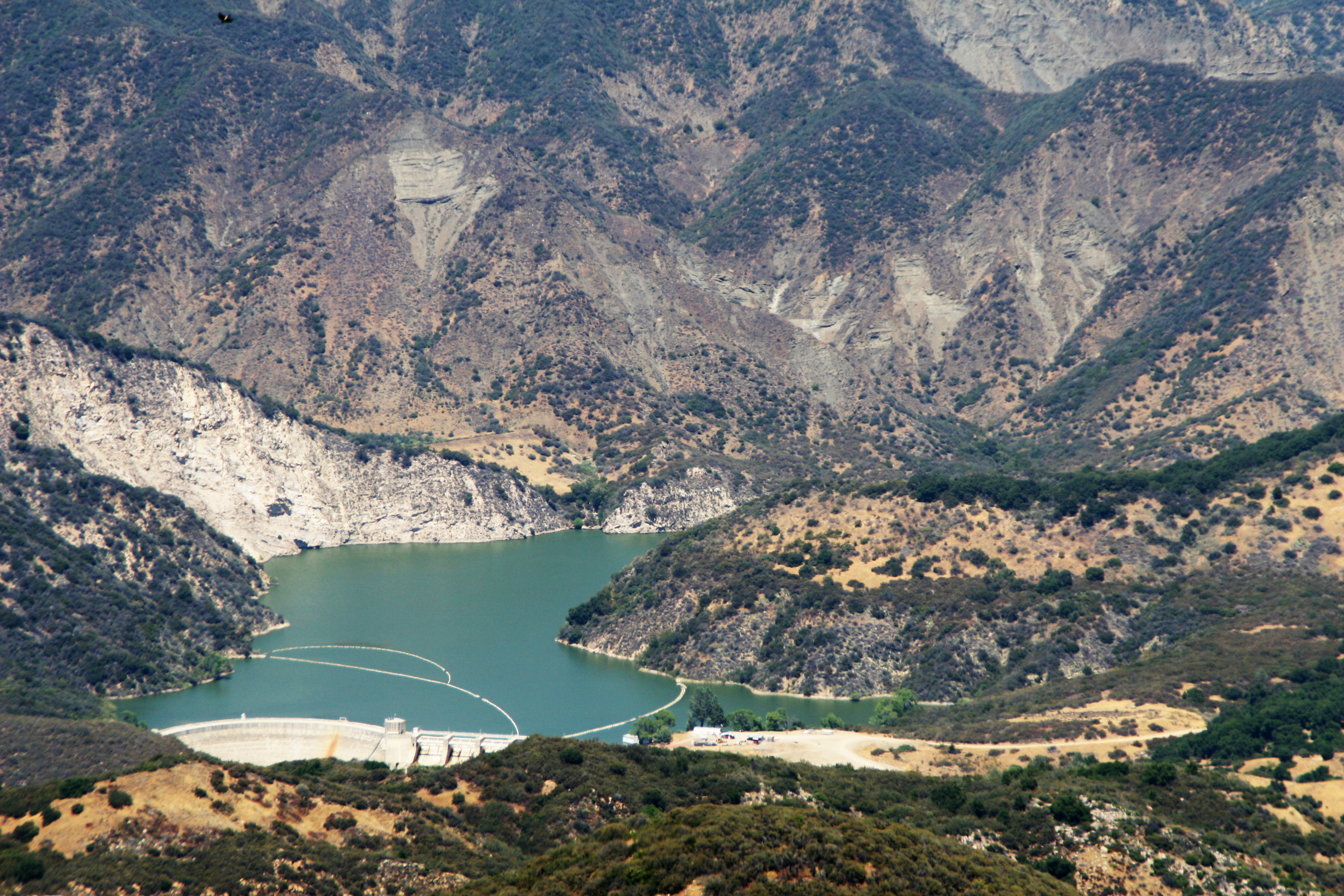
- Bird's eye view of the dam and lower part of the reservoir
- Interactive map of Gibraltar Dam
- Country: United States
- Location: Santa Barbara County, California
- Coordinates: 34°31′37″N 119°41′13″W
- Construction began: 1913; 113 years ago
- Opening date: January 23, 1920; 106 years ago
- Construction cost: $2 million (1920 dollars)
- Owner: City of Santa Barbara

Dam and spillways
- Type of dam: Concrete arch
- Impounds: Santa Ynez River
- Height: 194.5 ft (59.3 m)
- Length: 600 ft (180 m)

Reservoir
- Creates: Gibraltar Reservoir
- Total capacity: Original: 15,374 acre⋅ft (18,964,000 m^{3}); Most recent survey (2017): 4,968 acre⋅ft (6,128,000 m^{3}); Current (Estimate February 2019): 4,314 acre⋅ft (5,321,000 m^{3})
- Catchment area: 216 mi^{2} (560 km^{2})
- Surface area: 248 acres (100 ha)
- Normal elevation: 1,400 ft (430 m) max

Power Station
- Installed capacity: 820 KW
- Annual generation: 1,874,000 KWh

Gibraltar Dam is located on the Santa Ynez River, in southeastern Santa Barbara County, California, in the United States. Forming Gibraltar Reservoir, the dam is owned by the city of Santa Barbara. Originally constructed in 1920 and expanded in 1948, the dam and reservoir are located in a remote part of the Los Padres National Forest.

The main purpose of Gibraltar Dam is domestic water supply. It provides about 4,600 acre-feet (5,700,000 m^{3}) of water to Santa Barbara each year, supplying almost 30% of the city's needs. Water diverted from the dam also powers a small hydroelectric plant. Due to having lost a massive portion of its capacity to sediment build-up, the lake can often fill and spill after a single storm, while drying up completely in some years. As of February 2019, sedimentation has reduced the reservoir's capacity to 4,314 acre-feet (5,321,000 m^{3}), only 19% of its designed capacity.

The dam is built in a part of the Santa Ynez River called the "Gibraltar Narrows" that gave its name to the Gibraltar (or Sunbird) mercury mine, which operated next to what is now Gibraltar Reservoir between the 1870s and 1990s.

== Description ==
Gibraltar Dam is a constant radius concrete arch dam 194.5 feet (59.3 m) high and 600 feet (180 m) long. The dam is located about 72 miles (116 km) from the mouth of the Santa Ynez River and just above the confluence of Devils Canyon with the river. The dam controls runoff from a drainage basin of 216 square miles (560 km^{2}) with an annual inflow of 24,000 acre-feet (30,000,000 m^{3}). The Santa Ynez basin upstream is mostly wilderness and inflows are unregulated with the exception of the smaller Juncal Dam (owned by the Montecito Water District). Downstream of Gibraltar, the Santa Ynez flows into the much larger Lake Cachuma, owned by the U.S. Bureau of Reclamation.

The concrete spillway extends southward from the main dam and is controlled by four manually operated radial gates. Flashboards can be installed atop the gates during the non-flood season to increase the reservoir capacity. The spillway capacity is about 90,000 cubic feet per second (2,500 m^{3}/s). The spillway is designed so that overflow water cascades down the natural sandstone face adjacent to the dam, creating a 150-foot (46 m) high waterfall.

The original design capacity of Gibraltar Reservoir was 15,374 acre-feet (18,964,000 m^{3}). After its 1948 expansion the gross capacity was increased to 22,500 acre-feet (27,800,000 m^{3}), though so much sediment had already accumulated that the usable capacity was still only about 15,000 acre-feet (19,000,000 m^{3}). Since then, the dam has not been raised nor any sediment dredged from the reservoir, and it has gradually declined to a third of its original capacity. As of February 2019, sedimentation has reduced the reservoir's capacity to 4,314 acre-feet (5,321,000 m^{3}), or only 19% of its designed capacity.

Water is drawn from the reservoir via an intake structure near the south end of the dam into the 3.7-mile (6.0 km) Mission Tunnel, which transports water beneath the Santa Ynez Mountains to a small regulation basin, Lauro Reservoir. The water is either treated at the Cater Water Treatment Plant before entering the city's distribution system, or released into Mission Creek for groundwater recharge. The Mission Tunnel has a diversion capacity of 40 cubic feet per second (1.1 m^{3}/s).

At the end of the Mission Tunnel is the 820 kilowatt Lauro hydroelectric plant, which was initially constructed in 1985 but was idled in 1998 due to increasing costs. The city repaired and recommissioned the plant in 2015 after the cost of federal licensing decreased, but drought prevented the plant from actually running until early 2017.

== Climate ==
Climate data for Gibraltar Dam, CA (1991-2020 normals)
Month	Jan	Feb	Mar	Apr	May	Jun	Jul	Aug	Sep	Oct	Nov	Dec	Year
Mean daily maximum °F (°C)	66.1 (18.9)	66.9 (19.4)	70.1 (21.2)	75.5 (24.2)	80.0 (26.7)	88.2 (31.2)	93.7 (34.3)	95.5 (35.3)	91.4 (33.0)	83.3 (28.5)	73.3 (22.9)	64.3 (17.9)	79.0 (26.1)
Daily mean °F (°C)	51.2 (10.7)	51.7 (10.9)	54.3 (12.4)	58.1 (14.5)	63.0 (17.2)	68.6 (20.3)	74.4 (23.6)	75.0 (23.9)	71.2 (21.8)	64.1 (17.8)	56.7 (13.7)	48.9 (9.4)	61.4 (16.3)
Mean daily minimum °F (°C)	36.2 (2.3)	36.4 (2.4)	38.4 (3.6)	40.6 (4.8)	45.9 (7.7)	48.9 (9.4)	55.0 (12.8)	54.4 (12.4)	50.9 (10.5)	44.8 (7.1)	40.0 (4.4)	33.5 (0.8)	43.8 (6.6)
Average precipitation inches (mm)	7.06 (179)	7.56 (192)	4.68 (119)	1.65 (42)	0.68 (17)	0.05 (1.3)	0.07 (1.8)	0.00 (0.00)	0.09 (2.3)	1.11 (28)	1.48 (38)	4.19 (106)	28.62 (727)
Average precipitation days (≥ 0.01 in)	7.9	9.5	6.1	3.6	1.9	0.4	0.3	0.1	0.6	2.1	3.2	6.1	41.8
Source: NOAA

== Background and construction ==
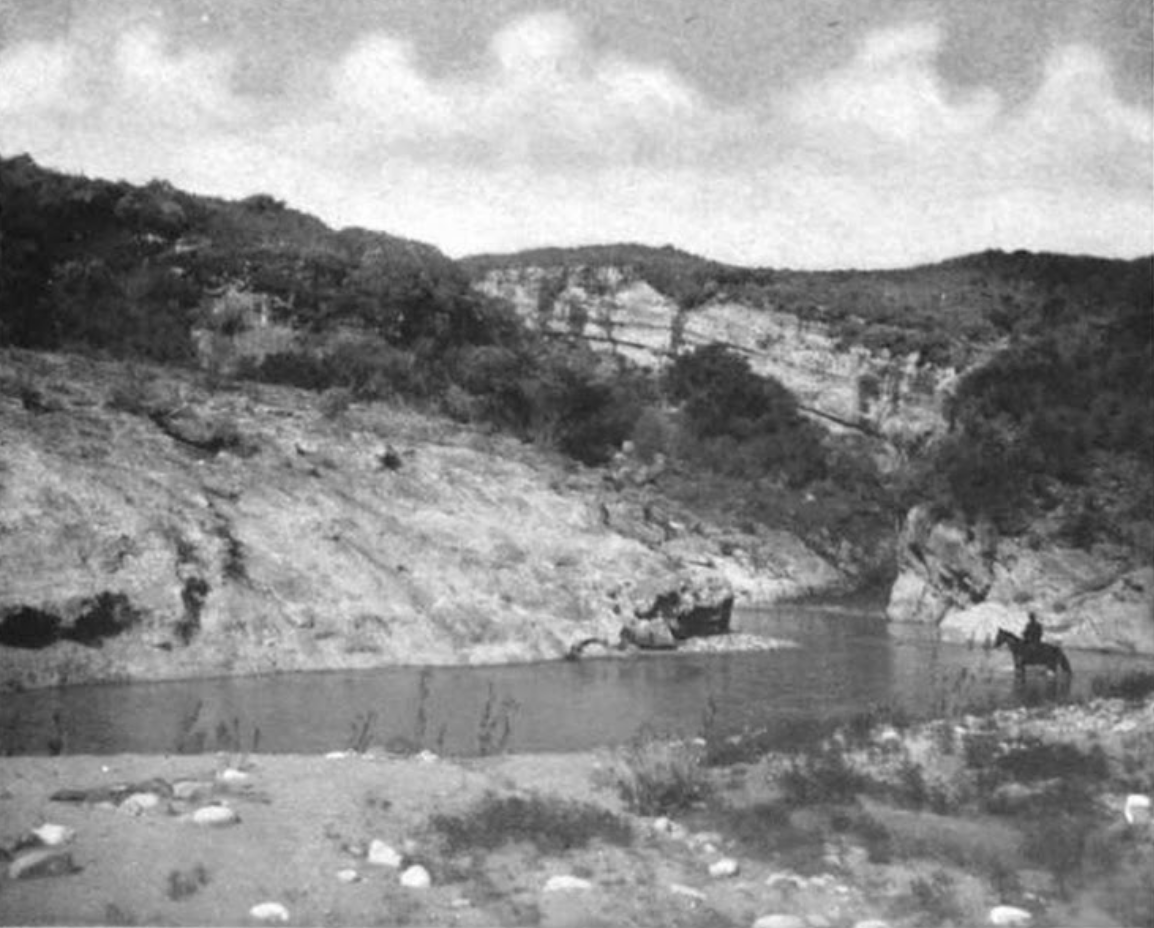
The Santa Ynez River at Gibraltar dam site, before damming.

In the early 1900s the City of Santa Barbara had exhausted its local water supplies, and looked to the drainage basin of the nearby Santa Ynez River, which is much larger than any of the city's local streams. In 1904 construction began on the Mission Tunnel which was bored under Mission Canyon in the Santa Ynez Mountains, to tap surface and ground water in the Santa Ynez basin. At that time, it was the longest water tunnel in the world. The city sought to build a dam somewhere on the Santa Ynez River in order to increase the water supply available for Mission Tunnel. Between 1913 and 1919, revenue bonds totaling $820,000 were issued for the construction of the dam and water system.

Several dam sites were considered including the Mono Creek, Juncal and Main River sites, but all were dropped in favor of Gibraltar, which offered the largest storage capacity and highest available run-off as well as the most geologically favorable dam site. Rock-fill, masonry and concrete designs were all studied. The Mission Tunnel was extended to the Gibraltar dam site, which would ultimately allow water to flow by gravity to Santa Barbara. Site preparation work began in 1913 with the placement of foundations in the riverbed, for which a $40,000 contract was awarded to Arthur S. Bent Construction Co. In 1917 a concrete "thrust block" was poured on the south side of the canyon to take the weight of the future dam, as the rock on this side was not high enough to support the structure. The contract for the dam itself was let to Bent Brothers and W.A. Kraner on July 8, 1918.

Because there was no road to the site, workers and supplies were transported via an 18 in (460 mm) gauge, 220-volt electric railway inside the Mission Tunnel, which was only 4 feet (1.2 m) high and 3.5 feet (1.1 m) wide. This also limited the size of the equipment used at the site, such as a steam shovel, concrete mixers and rock crushers, which had to be disassembled and moved through the tunnel piece by piece. Up to three trains were operated at once, with a passing siding in the middle of the tunnel allowing for one trainload of supplies to be delivered every half-hour. Hazardous materials such as dynamite were not allowed inside the tunnel and had to be packed over the Santa Ynez Mountains on a primitive trail. The work was made even more difficult by the constant leakage of groundwater into the tunnel which formed "a continuous downpour from the roof in many places" and special care had to be taken to prevent contamination, since this water ultimately flowed into Santa Barbara's municipal supply.

After the numerous logistics problems were worked out, construction of the dam proceeded at a rapid pace with 15,000 cubic yards (11,000 m^{3}) poured in the first three months of work. To allow normal river flows to pass through the dam during construction, a 4-by-6-foot (1.2 m × 1.8 m) hole was left in the bottom of the dam. A total of 270,000 sacks of cement and 400,000 board feet of lumber were hauled through the tunnel during construction. Aggregate used for concrete making was mined from the river bed and processed at a crushing/screening plant located about 200 feet (61 m) upstream from the dam. The mixed concrete was then placed on the dam via a cableway system anchored by a 185-foot (56 m) steel tower. During the winter of 1918-1919 construction had to halt for three months due to the risk of flooding in the river-bottom gravel mining areas. The dam was initially built to a height of 170 feet (52 m) above the stream bed, and 185 feet (56 m) above bedrock.

When completed on January 23, 1920, Gibraltar became the first dam to impound the Santa Ynez River. Due to the extremely inaccessible location of the dam, construction ended up costing nearly $2,000,000. According to the Engineering News-Record (1920) "at no place on the dam is variation from true line greater than one inch." The hole in the base of the dam was closed by a temporary valve before being concreted in from downstream, allowing the reservoir to begin filling. Although the dam itself was now complete, there was a lack of funds to finish the spillway. The winter of 1920-21 was dry and the new reservoir failed to fill, forcing the city to use limited groundwater supplies. Heavy rains in January and February 1922 filled and overflowed the reservoir for the first time. Flooding heavily damaged the temporary spillway, and erosion along a previously unknown fault zone beneath the spillway nearly led to its collapse. The structure was rebuilt at a cost of $90,000.

== Gin Chow v. Santa Barbara ==
In 1928 Gin Chow, who owned a farm on the Santa Ynez River, sued the city of Santa Barbara challenging its right to divert water from Gibraltar Reservoir, and soon 39 other farmers in the Santa Ynez Valley signed on to the case. Chow's demand was based upon the doctrine of riparian water rights in which existing landowners along a river have the right to the full, unimpaired flow of the stream through their property regardless of how or whether they use it. Riparian rights had been challenged by a controversial state amendment passed that year, which provided that "the water resources of the State be put to beneficial use" and that "the right to water... does not and shall not extend to the waste or unreasonable use... of water" and the Gin Chow case was the first serious legal test of the amendment.

Five years later Gin S. Chow v. Santa Barbara was settled in the California Supreme Court in favor of the city. The court determined that "the waters to be impounded and taken by the defendants are extraordinary storm waters of the river and not a part of the usual and customary flow of the stream" – essentially, the diversion did not have a negative effect on downstream landowners since these floodwaters would have flowed into the ocean anyway. The Gin Chow decision allowed the city to divert up to 4,189 acre-feet (5,167,000 m^{3}) per year from Gibraltar Dam as a "prescriptive right", but also required the city to release at least 616 acre-feet (760,000 m^{3}) during the late summer and fall when the natural river flow is lowest. In addition, the city is allowed to take "an additional amount of storm runoff resulting from torrential rains." These rules continue to govern the operation of the dam today.

Gin Chow is considered a landmark case in the development of California water law, as it upheld the 1928 amendment, reducing riparian landowners' legal power over the state's water resources. This enabled more parties, such as the city of Santa Barbara, to file claims on surface water as long as the concept of "reasonable use" was observed. The court also emphasized that "what is such reasonable use is a question of fact, and depends upon the circumstances appearing in each particular case" and that "it requires no extraordinary foresight to envision the great and increasing population of the state... dependent upon stored water – water that is now wasted into the sea and lost to any beneficial use. This is considered to have set a legal precedent for the state of California to build more dams.

== Expansion projects ==
Immediately after its construction, the reservoir began to suffer from heavy sedimentation, a problem made worse by occasional wildfires in upstream areas. The 1932 Matilija Fire burned some 50,000 acres (20,000 ha) of the drainage basin, and in response to the increased erosion the U.S. Forest Service constructed two debris dams upstream to hold back sediment washed off the burned landscape. The Mono Debris Dam, an Ambursen-type structure, was built in 1936 and had completely filled with 1 million yd^{3} (770,000 m^{3}) of sediment by 1938. The concrete-arch Agua Caliente Debris Dam was completed in late 1937 and by 1941 had filled with 750,000 yd^{3} (570,000 m^{3}) of sediment. Despite the scale of these conservation projects, they only extended Gibraltar's useful life by a few years. The flood of March 1938 was a major contributor to the large volume of debris run-off and caused $340,000 of damage downstream in the Lompoc area.

By 1948, sediment had filled half of Gibraltar reservoir. Compounding the problem, severe drought struck in the winter of 1947-48, and the remaining water was soon sucked dry and an emergency water rationing ordinance was enacted. In summer 1948 the dam was raised 23 feet (7.0 m) and a new buttressed spillway section added. This restored the reservoir to a capacity of 14,000 acre-feet (17,000,000 m^{3}) when it filled the next winter. Enlarging the dam cost $1.1 million, which was again paid by bonds issued by the city of Santa Barbara. However, the expanded reservoir continued filling with sediment faster than expected. Without enough storage capacity the reservoir has been subject to more frequent spills, depriving the city of water it otherwise could have used. This was a major factor behind the construction of Bradbury Dam by the federal government in 1953 to store more Santa Ynez River water in Lake Cachuma, about 25 miles (40 km) downstream of Gibraltar Dam.

After a seismic evaluation in 1983, Gibraltar Dam was rehabilitated by the U.S. Army Corps of Engineers after it was found at risk of failure from a strong earthquake. A buttress of roller-compacted concrete was laid against the downstream face. Although the project added no new storage capacity to the dam, it was designed to support a 20-foot (6.1 m) increase in height should that be needed in the future. The work was carried out from October to December 1990 and involved placing 93,000 cubic yards (71,000 m^{3}) of concrete. This essentially changed the dam from a pure arch to an arch-gravity structure. The entire cost of the project was $8.18 million.

== "Pass-through" operation and future plans ==
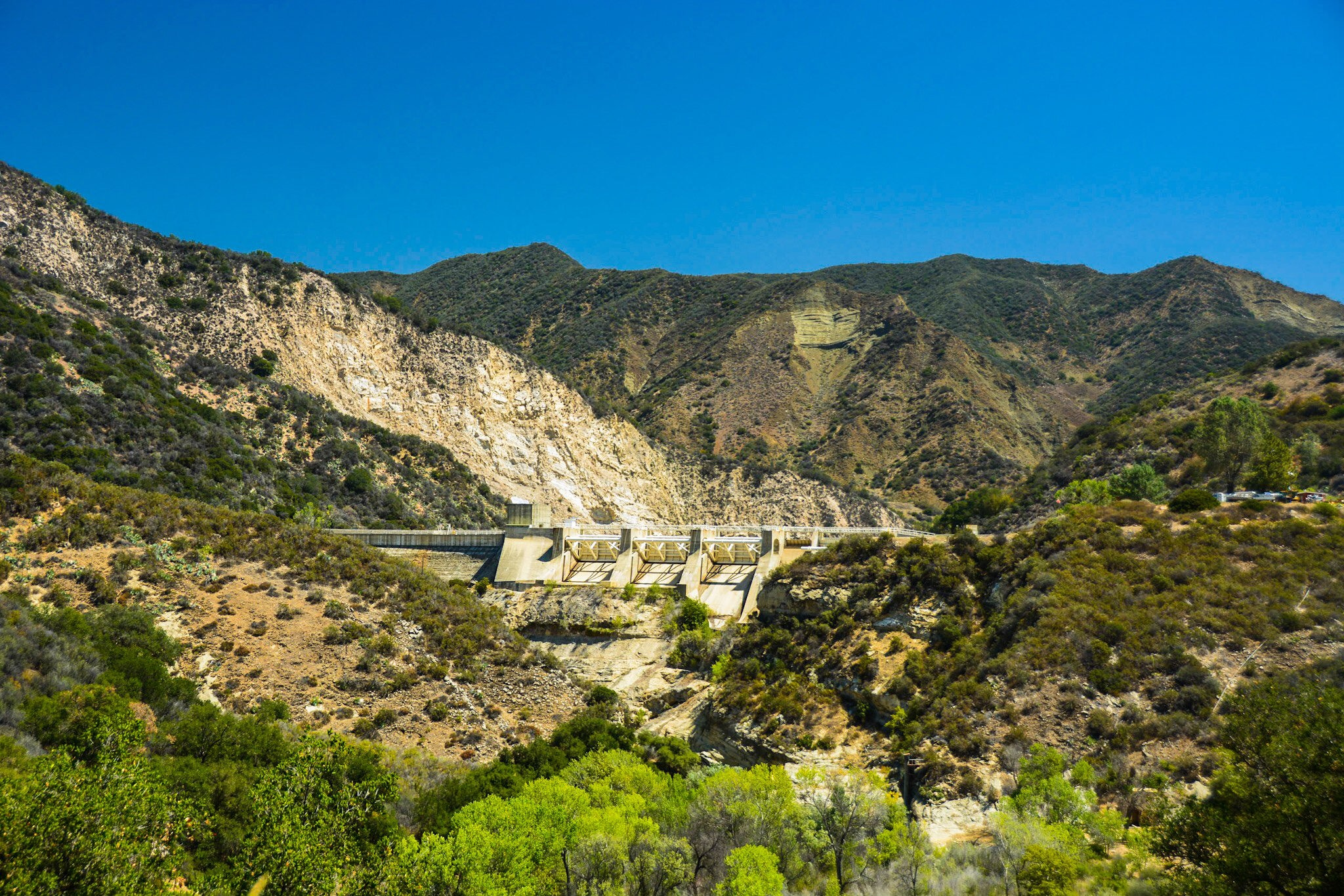
Gibraltar Dam, viewed from downstream

In the early 1980s the city of Santa Barbara once again expressed interest in raising the dam. However, the California Department of Water Resources and U.S. Bureau of Reclamation determined that further enlargement of Gibraltar Dam would have an adverse effect on water flowing downstream into the Lake Cachuma reservoir. In 1989 the Upper Santa Ynez River Operations Agreement or "Pass Through Agreement" was developed in which some water spilled from Gibraltar Dam can be legally stored in Lake Cachuma for the city's use, thus eliminating the need to raise Gibraltar.

In 2017, the U.S. Bureau of Reclamation estimated the annual sediment inflow rate at 210 acre-feet (260,000 m^{3}) or about 1.3 percent of its original design capacity per year. In the 21st century the reservoir has also been frequently at a low level, due both to persistent drought conditions and high water demand. In 2016 the reservoir dried up so completely that water had to be trucked to the dam keeper.

As of 2017, there were no plans to remove sediment from the reservoir or to mitigate its inflow. The 1989 Pass Through Agreement was designed under the assumption that, once Gibraltar reservoir is nearly full of sediment, it will be operated as a run-of-the-river project (serving only to divert water) with most of its storage functions transferred to Lake Cachuma. However, the Bureau of Reclamation predicts that the reservoir will not completely fill with mud; it will stabilize at about 2,000 acre-feet (2,500,000 m^{3}) of water volume due to the "flushing action of high flows" and that this level will be reached around 2031.

== Environmental issues ==
Gibraltar Dam completely blocked migrating steelhead to the upper third of the Santa Ynez River when completed in 1920. This was despite a 1916 suggestion of the California Fish and Game Commission that a fish ladder be constructed with the dam; no such structure was ever built. The dam "altered downstream hydrology, sediment transport, stream habitat, [and] water quality" and also delayed steelhead migration during the early rainy season by holding back floodwaters that otherwise might have breached the sandbar at the mouth of the river.

No reliable estimates have been made of the steelhead population prior to Gibraltar's construction; however, it is believed to have been much greater. The dam did not appear to have a large impact on downstream steelhead populations; in 1946 a group of fisheries biologists described steelhead habitat between Solvang and Gibraltar Dam as "excellent". Steelhead migration to the base of Gibraltar Dam ended with the completion of Bradbury Dam in 1953. In 2004 it was proposed to trap adult steelhead below Bradbury Dam and truck them to the river above Gibraltar Dam so they could be allowed to complete their natural migration, but this plan was not implemented.

Despite the fragmentation of certain aquatic habitats, the dam has also inadvertently created new riparian habitat along the Santa Ynez River as the upstream end of Gibraltar Reservoir gradually fills in with sediment. A wide floodplain with a well defined stream channel was created, and is now home to typical California riparian woodland (willow, cottonwood and oak). This has provided habitat for endangered species such as the least Bell's vireo.

The 2007 Zaca Fire burned much of the upper Santa Ynez watershed, causing huge amounts of ash-laden silt to flow into Gibraltar Reservoir. Organic material in the ash reacted with chlorine disinfectant in Santa Barbara's water supply to form carcinogenic compounds. Cleaning up the water cost the city nearly $3 million. Other more recent fires have also impacted the Gibraltar watershed, such as the 2016 Rey Fire and the 2017 Thomas Fire.

There have been concerns of mercury contamination at the reservoir due to the proximity of the old Gibraltar Mine (Sunbird Mine) which ceased operations in 1991. However, no evidence of mercury has been found in the reservoir, and there have been no cases of mercury poisoning in Santa Barbara County connected with the mine site.

== Public access ==
Although the dam and reservoir are open to the public, only official vehicles are allowed on the narrow winding dirt roads leading to the dam. The shortest way to reach the dam on foot is a 6-mile (9.7 km) round trip hike along the Santa Ynez River from Red Rock Campground. It can also be reached from several trails originating at Camino Cielo Road. The Gibraltar Trail follows the southern edge of the reservoir from the dam, and several other trails branch around the reservoir into the backcountry of Los Padres National Forest. Boating, fishing and swimming are not allowed at the reservoir since it is a public water supply.

== See also ==
- Bradbury Dam
- Juncal Dam
- List of dams and reservoirs in California
- List of lakes in California

== Works cited ==
- Brown, Carl Barrier (1944). The Control of Reservoir Silting: Issue 521 of United States Department of Agriculture, Misc. Publication. United States Government Printing Office.
- Carey, Craig R. (2012). Hiking and Backpacking Santa Barbara and Ventura. Wilderness Press. ISBN 978-0-89997-635-8.
- Frank, Bernard; Betts, Clifford Allen (1946). Water and Our Forests. U.S. Forest Service.
- Lippincott, Joseph Barlow (1905). Water Problems of Santa Barbara, California. United States Government Printing Office.
- Troxell, Harold C. (1957). Water Resources of Southern California With Special Reference To the Drought of 1944-51. United States Government Printing Office.
- Warner, Richard E.; Hendrix, Kathleen M. (1984). California Riparian Systems: Ecology, Conservation, and Productive Management. University of California Press. ISBN 0-52005-035-5.
