= Bradbury Dam =

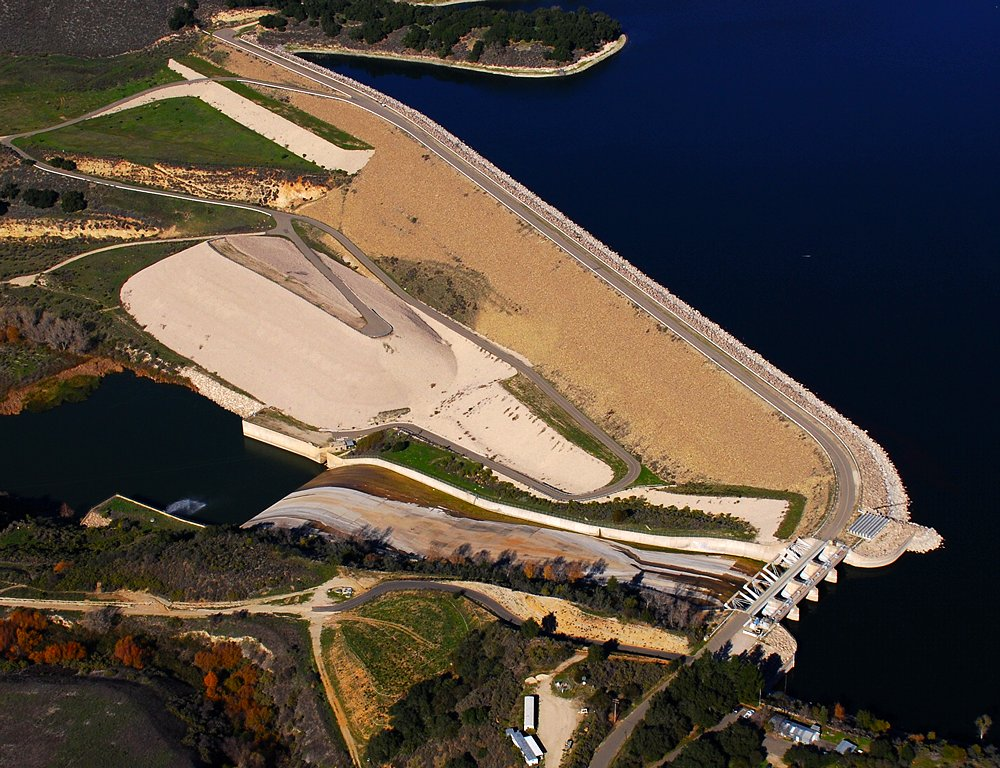

- Location within California
- Country: United States
- Location: Santa Barbara County, California
- Coordinates: 34°34′58″N 119°58′50″W
- Construction began: 1950; 76 years ago
- Opening date: 1953; 73 years ago
- Owner: U.S. Bureau of Reclamation

Dam and spillways
- Type of dam: earthfill
- Impounds: Santa Ynez River
- Height: 279 ft (85 m)
- Length: 2,850 ft (870 m)
- Elevation at crest: 766 ft (233 m)
- Dam volume: 6,695,000 yd^{3} (5,119,000 m^{3})
- Spillways: Gate-controlled concrete chute
- Spillway capacity: 161,000 cu ft/s (4,600 m^{3}/s)

Reservoir
- Creates: Cachuma Lake
- Total capacity: 205,000 acre⋅ft (253,000,000 m^{3})
- Catchment area: 417 sq mi (1,080 km^{2})
- Surface area: 3,250 acres (1,320 ha)
- Normal elevation: 750 ft (230 m)

Power Station
- Hydraulic head: 206 ft (63 m)
- Installed capacity: None

Bradbury Dam is an earthen dam across the Santa Ynez River in central Santa Barbara County, California. The dam forms Lake Cachuma, which provides the majority of water supplies within the county.

Although the Santa Ynez can reach massive flows in the winter, it usually dries up for several months of the year in the summer. A large storage facility to catch winter floodwaters for use in the summer and autumn was desperately needed by the growing population of the region, especially that of south coast cities like Santa Barbara and Carpinteria. Even before Bradbury Dam was considered, the Gibraltar Dam was built upstream to divert water through a tunnel to the city of Santa Barbara. However, that dam was plagued by siltation and was unable to fully serve the water requirements of the city.

Construction on Bradbury Dam started in 1950 as part of a U.S. Bureau of Reclamation scheme called the Cachuma Project, intended to provide long-term water storage and delivery to Santa Barbara and other cities throughout the region as well as provide water for irrigation. Originally named the Cachuma Dam upon completion in 1953, the name was changed in 1971 to honor C. W. "Brad" Bradbury, a local water supply proponent.

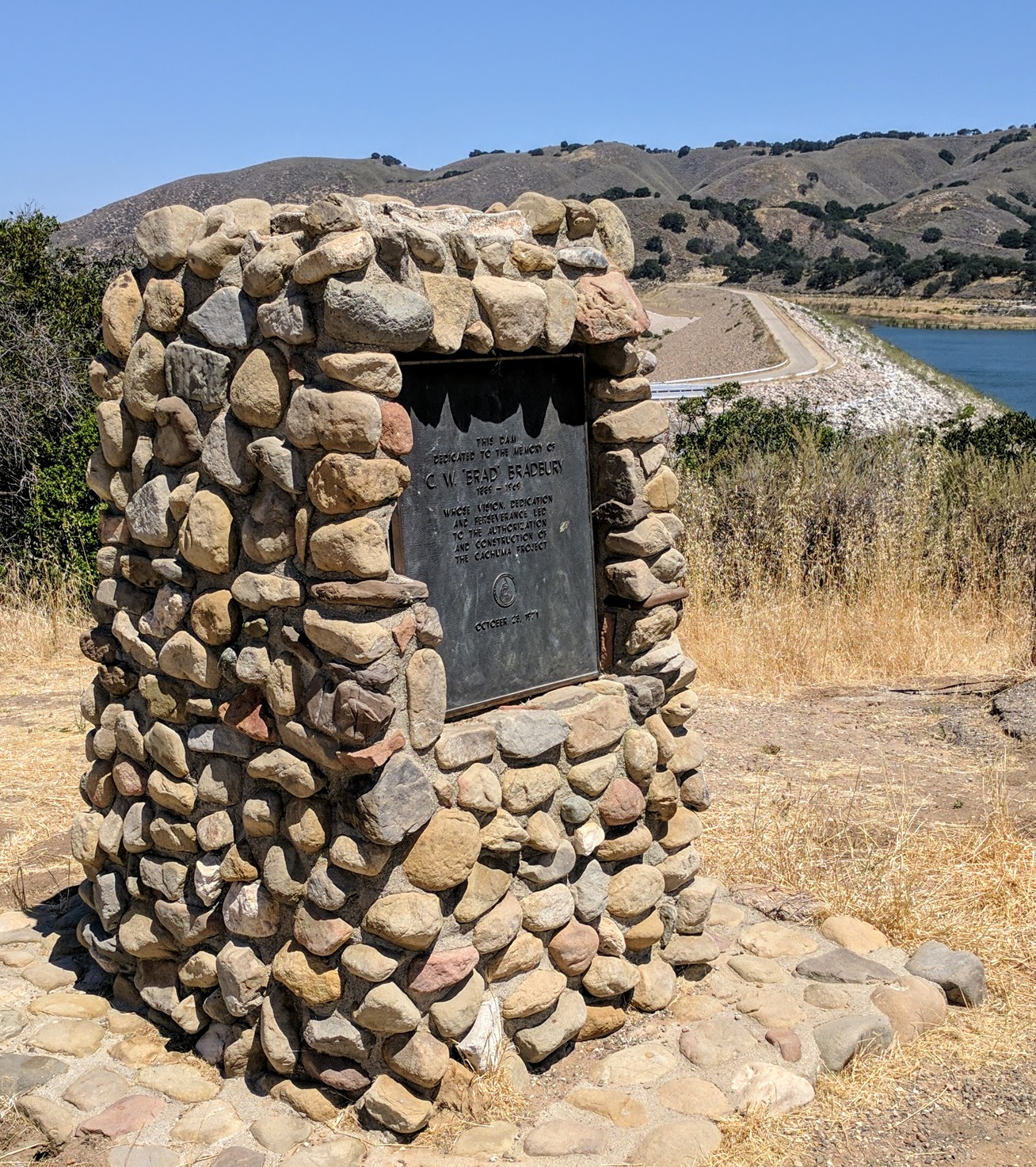
The dedication plaque for Bradbury Dam, to C. W. "Brad" Bradbury, at the vista point off California State Route 154, with the dam in the background

== See also ==
- List of dams and reservoirs in California
