= Salsipuedes Creek (Santa Ynez River tributary) =

Stream in Santa Barbara County, California, US

Salsipuedes Creek Arrollo De Salsipuedes

Location
- Country: United States
- State: California
- County: Santa Barbara
- City: Lompoc

Physical characteristics
- Source
  - coordinates: 34°31′37″N 120°23′06″W
  - elevation: 1,000 ft (300 m)
- Mouth: Confluence with Santa Ynez River
  - location: Southeast of Lompoc, California
  - coordinates: 34°37′54″N 120°24′46″W
  - elevation: 115 ft (35 m)

Basin features
- Tributaries
  - right: El Jaro Creek

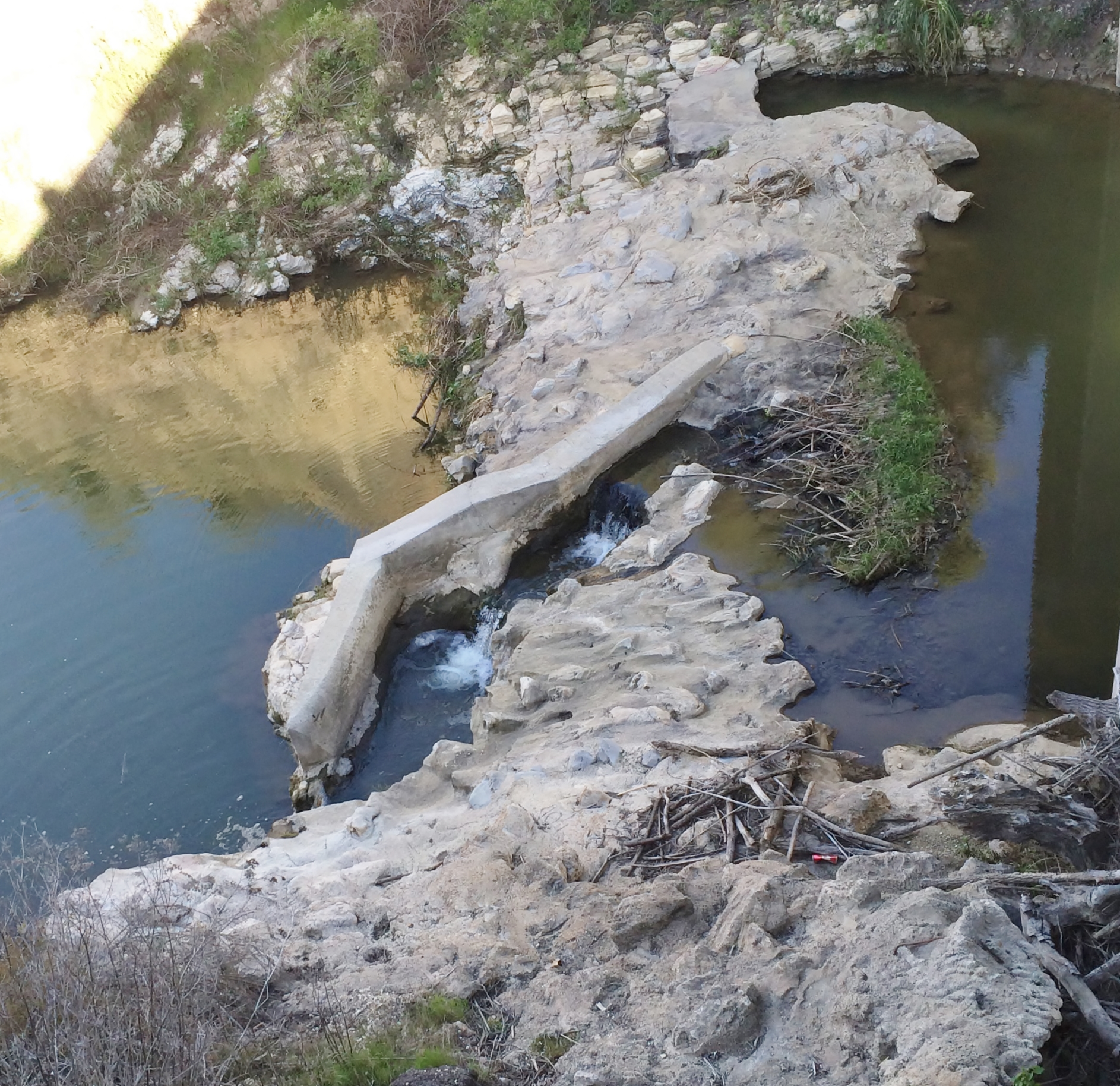
Beaver dam partially blown out by winter rains at trout fish ladder on Salsipuedes Creek below Hwy 1 at Jalama Weir.

Salsipuedes Creek is a 9.9 miles (15.9 km) long stream, flowing north to join the Santa Ynez River just southeast of Lompoc in Santa Barbara County, California. Salsipuedes Creek, along with its major tributary, El Jaro Creek, is the largest tributary to the lower Santa Ynez River, shortly before the river reaches the Pacific Ocean.

== History ==
The river was first named by the Spanish Arollo del Jaro. In the Spanish language it means "get out if you can", a name conferred on flashy streams in narrow canyons.

== Watershed and Course ==
The Salsipuedes Creek/El Jaro Creek watershed drains approximately 47.1 square miles (122 km^{2}) and flows roughly 25.1 miles (40.4 km) from its headwaters along the coastal Santa Ynez Mountains to its confluence with the lower Santa Ynez River.

Salsipuedes Creek runs north from its source along Jalama Road until it is met by El Jaro Creek, a 13-mile long tributary, just south of where Jalama Road meets U.S. Highway 1, then Salsipuedes Creek mainstem continues north along Highway 1 to Santa Rosa Road, where the creek has its confluence with the Santa Ynez River. El Jaro Creek has two tributaries with intermittent flows, Los Amoles Creek and Ytias Creek, which are 3.5 miles (5.6 km) and 4.2 miles (6.8 km) long, respectively.

== Ecology ==
Upper Salsipuedes Creek and El Jaro Creeks have perennial flows and provide good steelhead trout (Oncorhynchus mykiss) habitat. Southern steelhead trout were listed as endangered in 1997, when the National Marine Fisheries Service listed the anadromous trout below Bradbury Dam on the Santa Ynez River as critical habitat under the Endangered Species Act of 1973. North American beaver (Castor canadensis) improve juvenile rearing habitat for salmonids and are prevalent on Salsipuedes Creek, coincidentally the best trout habitat in the Santa Ynez River watershed.

== See also ==
- List of rivers in California
