= Gin Chow =

Chinese immigrant who gained fame in California

Gin Chow (1857–1933) was a Chinese immigrant who gained fame in California as a prophet and fortune teller able to predict the weather and other natural events. Chow is credited with successfully predicting the 1925 Santa Barbara earthquake. Chow was also the main plaintiff in the California Supreme Court case Gin Chow v. City of Santa Barbara which still ranks as one of the most important water rights cases in the state.

== Biography ==
Born in Guangzhou as the son of teachers, Chow immigrated to California at the age of 16 in 1873. When he arrived in San Francisco, he worked as a dish washer in a French restaurant, went into domestic service for six years for William Welles Hollister, and later became a gardener. He met his wife while living in Northern California. They had three children. By 1890 Chow and his family had moved south to the Lompoc Valley where he owned a small farm. He grew strawberries and casaba melons which he then sold on the streets of Santa Barbara.

Chow gain regional reputation with accounts of his prediction of the 1925 earthquake which hit the Santa Barbara area retold in articles by Los Angeles Times columnist Harry Carr and in books by Santa Barbara News-Press publisher Thomas More Storke. Greater recognition came when Chow himself produced Gin Chow's First Annual Almanac in 1932 with the encouragement of Carr. The book included details on some of his past predictions as well as prognostications. Chow's popularity remained thanks in part to daily weather forecasts from Chow featured in Carr's Times columns and read by Chow over the radio on station KHJ. The income provided by his book enabled Chow to save his farm from bankruptcy.

It was to save his farm that Chow also filed suit against the Cities of Santa Barbara and Montecito in 1928. The case reached the California Supreme Court in 1930 and was decided in favor of the cities.

Gin Chow died in 1933 at the age of 76 after being struck by a truck while walking.

== Predictions ==
=== Santa Barbara earthquake prediction ===
Chow's main claim to fame, the prediction of the Santa Barbara earthquake was described best in Gin Chow's First Annual Almanac published in 1932. In the book Chow states that on December 23, 1920 he posted a notice in the Santa Barbara post office letting it be known that an earthquake would flatten the city on June 29, 1925. The earthquake struck on the date noted and leveled 70 buildings in the city's commercial district.

=== Other predictions ===
Other predictions by Chow cited by Thomas Storke in his 1958 book California Editor include a prediction of the 1923 Great Kantō earthquake and a 1932 prediction of a United States war with Japan that would end in 1946 (World War II ended in 1945).

Chow made weather predictions he broadcast on KHJ, a local radio station of the time, and which Harry Carr included in his daily column in the L.A. Times. His weather prognostications came to be seen as being more accurate than those of the U.S. Weather Bureau.

Chow's last prediction came in 1932. He had been seriously gored by a bull and doctors believed him to be on his deathbed. Yet, Chow assured them that he would die one year later in 1933.

=== Skepticism ===
Skeptics of Chow point to there being no evidence that his earthquake predictions are anything but claims made after the events took place. Critics also called Chows's assertion that he used a mystic key handed down from his ancestors to make his calculations, magic hidden as science and pointed to an increasingly erratic record in predicting the weather as a sign that his predictions were based on random guessing.

== Gin Chow v. City of Santa Barbara ==
Alleging that Santa Barbara and Montecito were unlawfully diverting water for domestic use from the Santa Ynez River by having previously dammed it and planning to construct another dam, Chow filed a lawsuit against the Cities of Santa Barbara and Montecito for injunctive relief to obtain entitlement to water being diverted. Chow believed that his water rights, as an owner of land through which the Santa Ynez passed, were being violated.

The case reached the California Supreme Court (217 Cal. 673, 22 Pac. 5). The court ruled that no waters captured by the cities could have passed into Chow's holdings because the water taken by the cities constituted "... extraordinary storm waters of the river...." meaning that cities were entitled to take the excess flood waters from rivers "... where no use is made of such waters on the riparian land and no benefit accrues to riparian land from their passage over the bed of the stream, and no damage is caused to the riparian land from the proposed diversion."

The case is seen as having set a precedent for the state to build more dams.
