= Santa Ynez River =

River in California, United States

Santa Ynez River Río Grande de San Vernardo
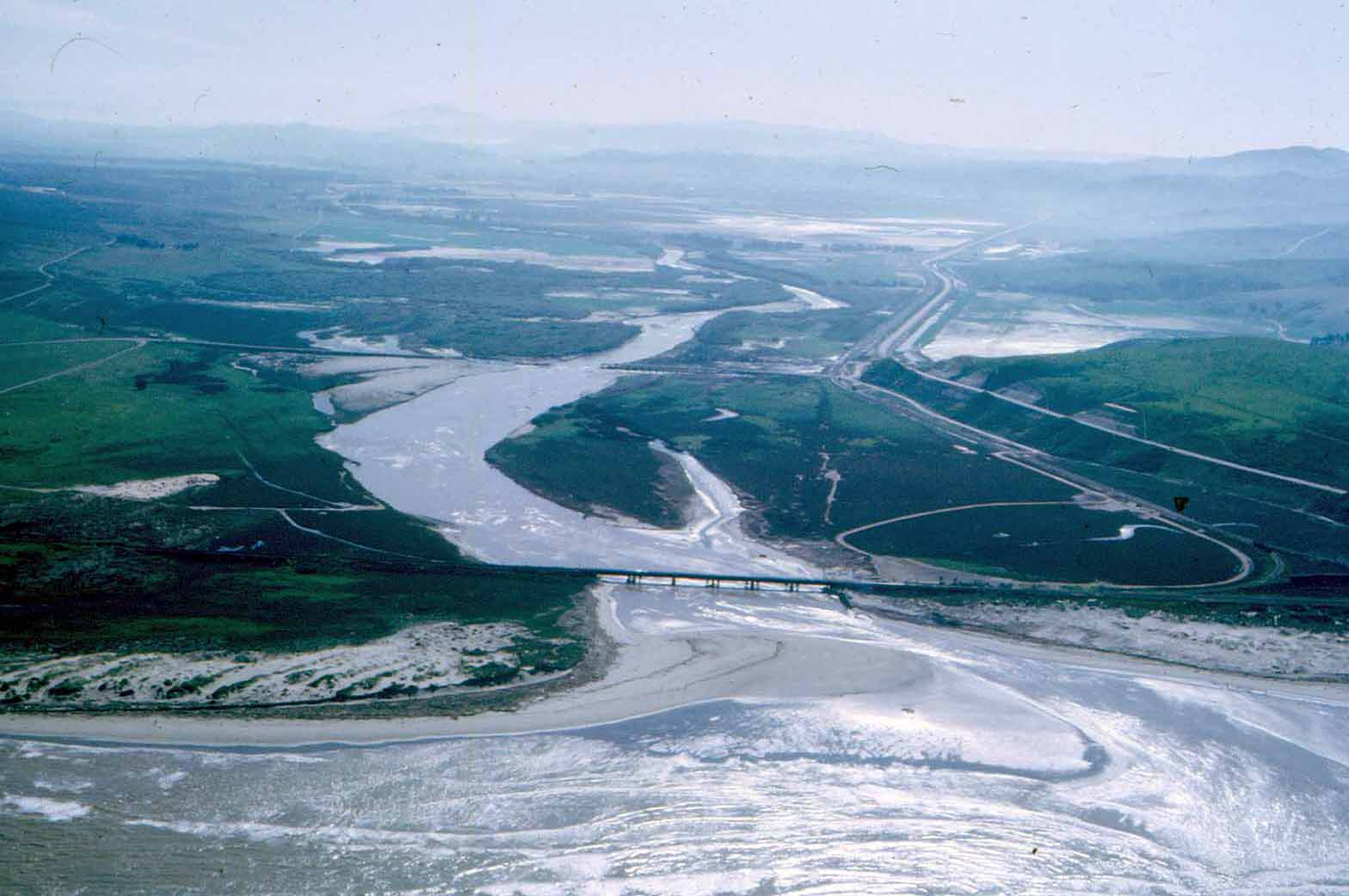
- Aerial view of the mouth of the river

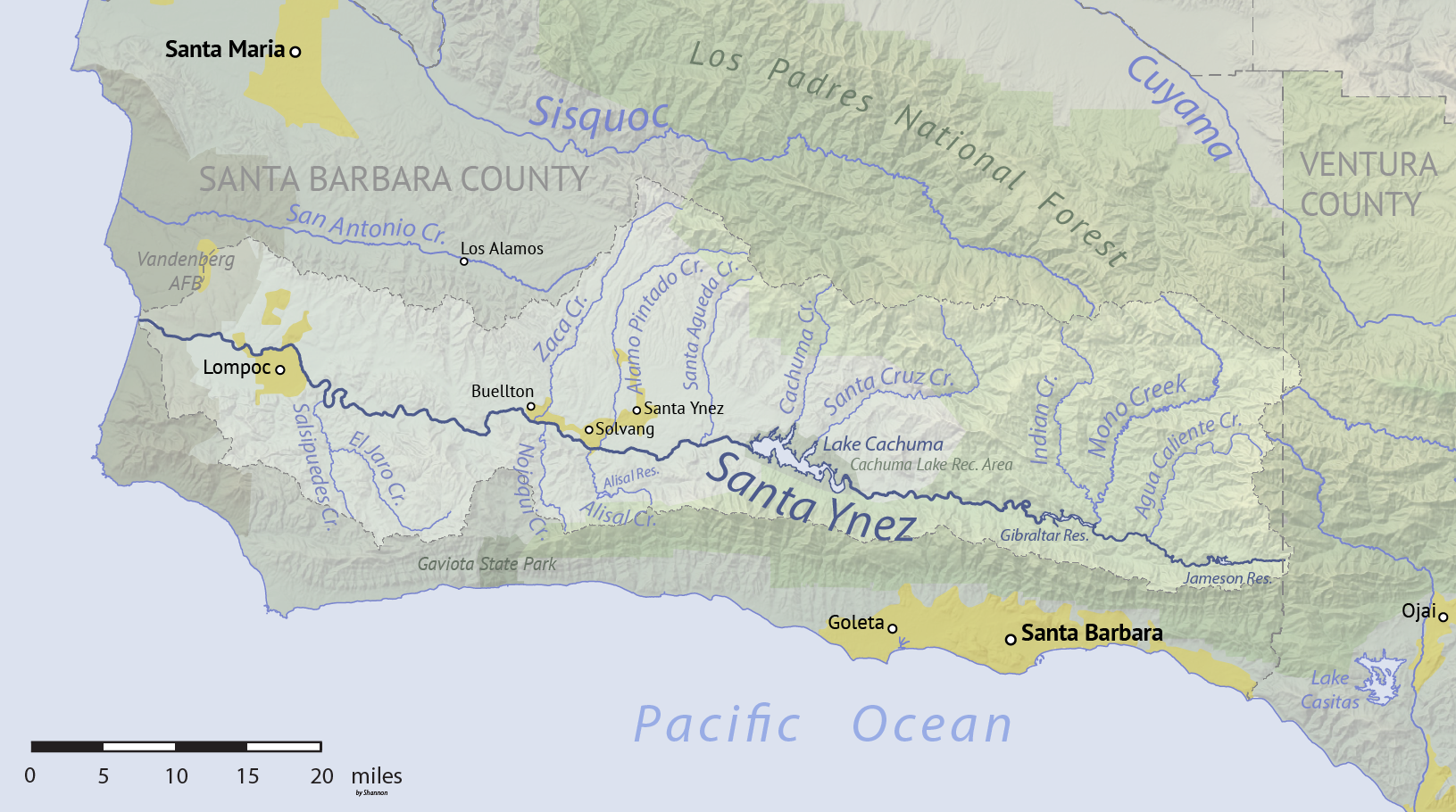
- Map of the Santa Ynez River watershed

Location
- Country: United States
- State: California
- County: Santa Barbara
- Cities: Solvang, Lompoc

Physical characteristics
- Source
  - location: Transverse Ranges
  - coordinates: 34°28′40″N 119°26′51″W
  - elevation: 4,140 ft (1,260 m)
- Mouth: Pacific Ocean
  - coordinates: 34°41′31″N 120°36′7″W
  - elevation: 0 ft (0 m)
- Length: 92 mi (148 km)
- Basin size: 896 sq mi (2,320 km^{2})
- Discharge
  - location: Narrows, near Lompoc
  - average: 127 cu ft/s (3.6 m^{3}/s)
  - minimum: 0 cu ft/s (0 m^{3}/s)
  - maximum: 120,000 cu ft/s (3,400 m^{3}/s)

Basin features
- Tributaries
  - left: Alder Creek, Alisal Creek, Salsipuedes Creek, Miguelito Creek
  - right: Santa Cruz Creek, Cachuma Creek, Santa Agueda Creek, Zanja de Cota Creek, Alamo Pintado Creek, Zaca Creek

The Santa Ynez River is one of the largest rivers on the Central Coast of California. It is 92 miles (148 km) long, flowing from east to west through the Santa Ynez Valley, reaching the Pacific Ocean at Surf, near Vandenberg Space Force Base and the city of Lompoc.

The river drains the north slope of the Santa Ynez Mountains, the south slope of the San Rafael Mountains, as well as much of the southern half of Santa Barbara County. Its drainage basin is 896 square miles (2,320 km^{2}) in area. The river's flow is highly variable. It usually dries up almost completely in summer, but can become a raging torrent in winter. The river has three dams which can impound a total of 210,000 acre-feet (260,000,000 m^{3}) of water in wet years.

== History ==
The river was first named by the Spanish Portolà expedition, first European land exploration of Alta California, which camped near the river mouth on August 30, 1769. Apparently unable to agree on a single name, expedition diarists recorded three. Engineer Miguel Costansó wrote "Río Grande de San Verardo". Franciscan missionary Juan Crespi noted two additional names; "San Bernardo" and "Santa Rosa". None of the three names remain attached to any feature in the area.

Instead, the river and mountains took the name of Mission Santa Inés (also spelled "Ynés" or "Ynéz" in New Spain), which was established in 1804 (dedicated to Saint Agnes of Rome, virgin and martyr). According to the USGS, variant and historical names of the Santa Ynez River include La Purisima River, Rio De La Purisima, Rio De Calaguasa, Rio Santa Rosa, Rio De Santa Ines, and Rio De Santa Ynes.

== Course ==
The Santa Ynez River originates in Los Padres National Forest, on the northern slope of the Santa Ynez Mountains near Divide Peak and the Ventura County border. The river flows west, collecting various headwater tributaries. The Upper Santa Ynez Campground is located near the river's source. After flowing through Billiard Flats the river enters Jameson Lake, the reservoir impounded by Juncal Dam. Below the dam, Alder Creek joins the Santa Ynez River from the south. At times water from Alder Creek is diverted into Jameson Lake via a tunnel.

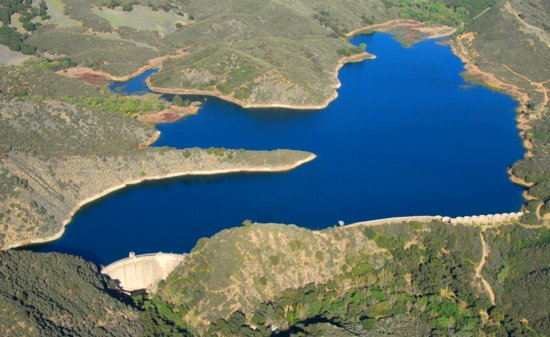
West end of Jameson Lake, 2012

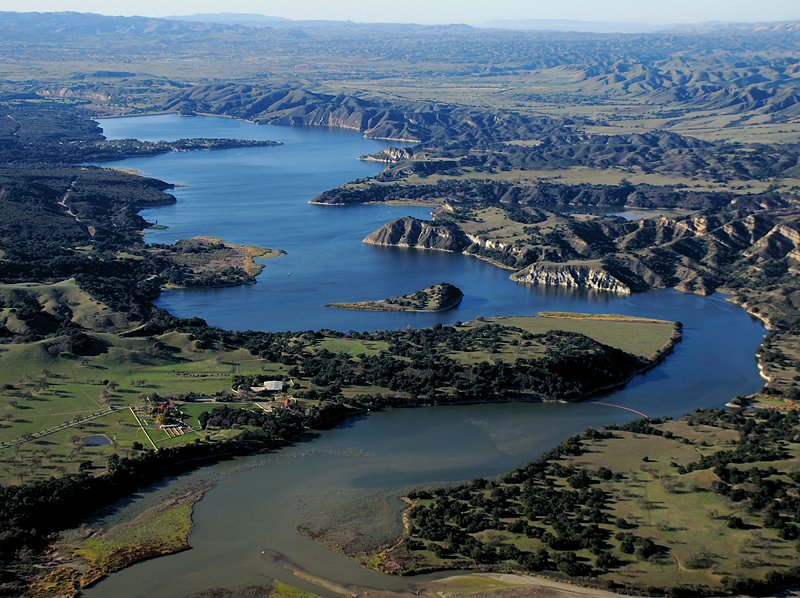
Lake Cachuma, a reservoir on the Santa Ynez River. The river is visible at the far bottom of the image.

Continuing its generally westward course, the Santa Ynez flows by several campgrounds and canyons, including Blue Canyon. Mono Creek joins from the north just as the Santa Ynez flows into Gibraltar Reservoir, impounded by Gibraltar Dam. Below this dam the river passes several campgrounds as well as facilities such as the Los Prietos Ranger Station. Paradise Road runs along the river. Continuing west, the river passes Fremont Campground near the mouth of Red Rock Canyon.

West of Red Rock Canyon the river leaves Los Padres National Forest and its valley widens considerably. Kelly Creek joins from the south, draining Los Laureles Canyon and Cold Spring Canyon. State Route 154, which crosses the Santa Ynez Mountains via San Marcos Pass, enters the Santa Ynez River valley at this point and follows the river for several miles to the west. Hot Spring Canyon joins from the south just before the Santa Ynez River enters Lake Cachuma.

Lake Cachuma, the largest reservoir on the river, is approximately 5 miles (8.0 km) in length. Several tributaries join the Santa Ynez River in Lake Cachuma, including Santa Cruz Creek and Cachuma Creek from the north and a number of smaller streams from the south. The lake area is designated as the Lake Cachuma Recreation Area. Cachuma County Park, near Tequepis Point, provides lake access. Water from the lake is diverted into the Tecolote Tunnel, which passes south under the mountains to the Santa Barbara area.

Below Lake Cachuma, the Santa Ynez River continues its westward course. Its valley continues to widen and contains ranches and other development. The river passes by the town of Santa Ynez and the cities of Solvang and Buellton. In Buellton the river is crossed by U.S. Route 101. Several tributaries join the river in this area, including Quiota Creek, Alisal Creek, and Nojoqui Creek and Falls from the south, and Santa Agueda Creek, Zanja de Cota Creek, Alamo Pintado Creek and Zaca Creek from the north.

West of Buellton the Santa Ynez River flows between the Santa Rita Hills and Purisima Hills to the north and the Santa Rosa Hills to the south. It is joined by Santa Rosa Creek from the north and Salsipuedes Creek from the south. Just west of Salsipuedes Creek the Santa Ynez River flows past the largest city in the valley, Lompoc. A few miles west of Lompoc the river reaches the Pacific Ocean at a location known as Surf, where there is a beach and an Amtrak station. While there is public access to Surf and the mouth of the Santa Ynez River, most of the land between Lompoc and the ocean is part of Vandenberg Space Force Base.

=== Discharge ===
The USGS operates several stream gages along the Santa Ynez river. Gage 11133000 is located at Narrows, near Lompoc. The mean annual discharge recorded over the period since flow regulation by Lake Cachuma, in 1952, up to 2009, is 127 cubic feet per second (3.6 m^{3}/s). The maximum discharge was 80,000 cubic feet per second (2,300 m^{3}/s), recorded on January 25, 1969. The maximum discharge predating the stream gage was an estimated 120,000 cubic feet per second (3,400 m^{3}/s), during the flood of January 9, 1907. There is no flow at all for several months each year.

== River modifications ==
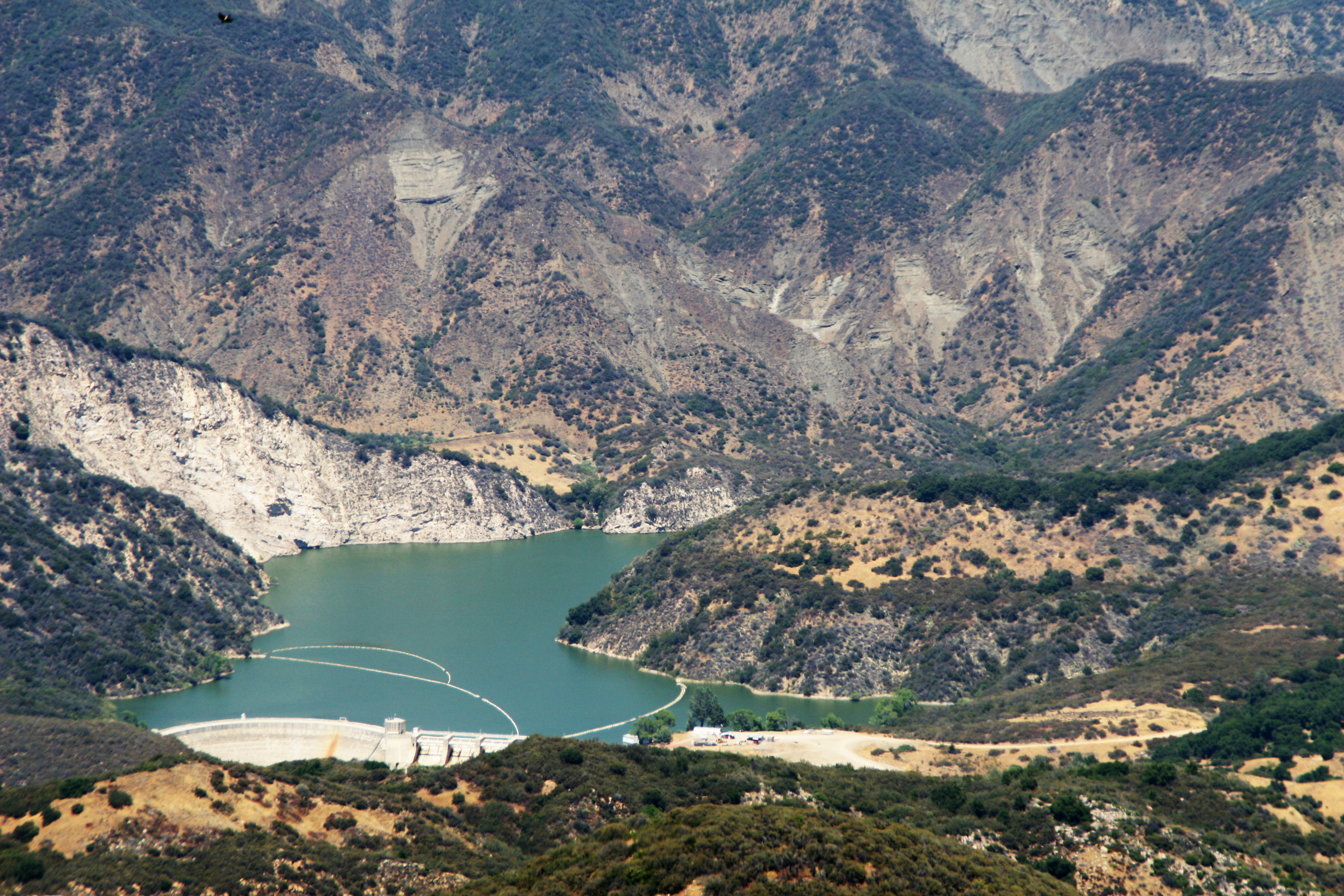
Gibraltar Dam and Reservoir, completed in 1920 and raised in 1940, after sedimentation had severely reduced its capacity. 2009 photo by Doc Searls.

There are three reservoirs on the river, the largest of which is Lake Cachuma, with a capacity of 205,000 acre-feet (253,000,000 m^{3}). Bradbury Dam, which forms the lake, was built by the U.S. Bureau of Reclamation. Water from Lake Cachuma is diverted into the Tecolote Tunnel, which passes south under the Santa Ynez Mountains. The tunnel supplies water to the city of Santa Barbara (which uses it for drinking water), the Goleta Water District, the Carpinteria Valley Water District, and the Montecito Water District. Water from Lake Cachuma is released into the Santa Ynez River below Bradbury Dam in order to satisfy downstream water rights.

The other two reservoirs are Gibraltar Reservoir, impounded by Gibraltar Dam, and Jameson Lake, impounded by Juncal Dam. Gibraltar Reservoir supplies water to the City of Santa Barbara via the Santa Barbara Water Tunnel under the Santa Ynez Mountains. Jameson Lake supplies water to the Montecito Water District via another tunnel under the Santa Ynez Mountains. In 2004 the diversions amounted to 3,130 acre-feet (3,860,000 m^{3}) from Gibraltar Reservoir, and 1,730 acre-feet (2,130,000 m^{3}) from Jameson Lake.

A 2010 report on the restoration potential of the Santa Ynez River estuary, found "Over the last 150 years human activities, especially dam construction, have significantly affected river flows in the entire watershed. The most important changes to wetland habitats and ecologic processes have resulted from changed river inflows and sediment loads from the watershed combined with changing hydraulic and geomorphic effects from bridge causeways. These process changes have led to alteration of sedimentation and erosion patterns and converted wetland habitats to upland. Upstream dam construction now controls 47% of the watershed’s annual runoff, has reduced the frequency and duration of lagoon breaching as well as the magnitude and frequency of flood events that have the most important role in sustaining and renewing a mosaic of wetland and estuarine habitats within the estuary and lower river."

== Ecology ==
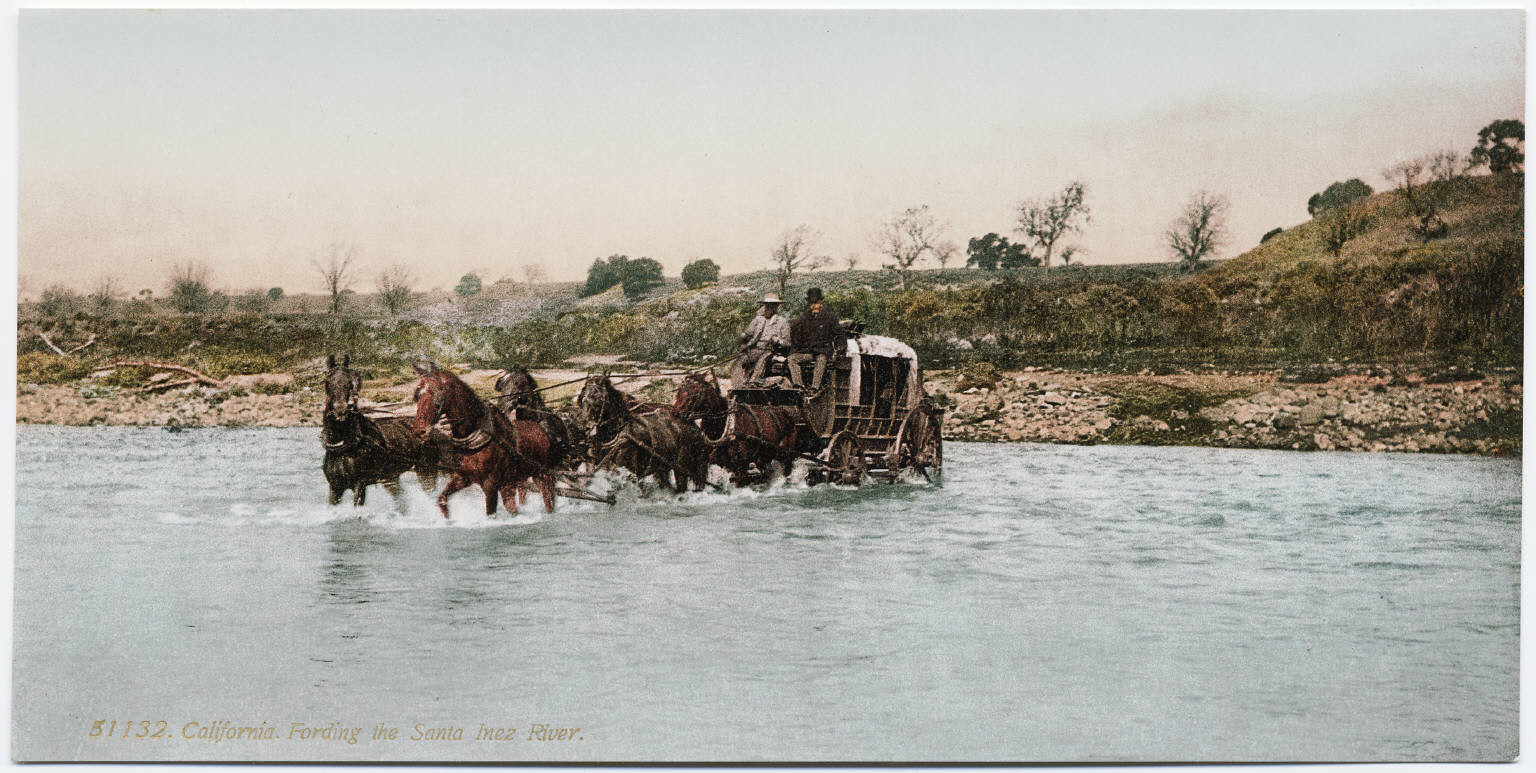
Early Western travelers fording the Santa Ynez River during the turn of the 20th century.

In the 1940s the Santa Ynez River was thought to have the largest run of steelhead (Oncorhyncus mykiss irideus) south of San Francisco Bay. Prior to the completion of Cachuma Dam in 1953, the steelhead run on the Santa Ynez River was estimated to be as high as 25,000 adults. Three decades earlier, in 1920, the Gibraltar Dam was built and blocked access to spawning in the upper watershed, so early twentieth century steelhead runs were likely much higher still. The National Marine Fisheries Service listed the Southern California steelhead Distinct Population Segment as endangered in 1997 due to a 99% decline in its population in the twentieth century. A wild rainbow trout population above the Cachuma Dam probably provides outgoing smolts which become steelhead trout in the ocean, however a low percentage of outgoing smolt survive the migration because of low to no flows or predation in the coastal estuary. Genetic analysis of the steelhead in the Santa Ynez River watershed has shown them to be of native and not hatchery stocks.

The lower Santa Ynez River in the Lompoc area, and lower tributary Salsipuedes Creek has about a dozen California Golden beaver (Castor canadensis subauratus) dams, in wet years steelhead can generally get around, over, or through beaver dams, and steelhead are common in rivers and streams where beaver are numerous. In addition, high winter flows disrupt the beaver dams and allow steelhead passage. The beavers may play a critical role for steelhead populations as their ponds replenish aquifers, allowing groundwater to recharge streams in dry summers, and provide perennial pools for oversummering trout smolts. Salmonid abundance and fish size increases when beaver are present. Evidence that beaver were once extant in southern California coastal streams includes an adult male beaver skull collected by mammalogist Dr. John Hornung in May, 1906 "along the Sespe River in Ventura County" which is now housed in the Berkeley Museum of Vertebrate Zoology. There is a Chumash pictograph of a beaver at Painted Rock in the nearby Cuyama River watershed. The Barbareño and Ventureño Chumash have a Beaver Dance. The Chumash word for beaver is Chipik, spelled "č’ǝpǝk’" in Barbareño and "tšǝ’pǝk" in Ventureño, and "č’ɨpɨk" in Ineseño (Samala) (Timothy Henry personal communication 2011-01-23). Father Pedro Font, on the second de Anza Expedition in 1776, described the coastal Chumash women as wearing beaver capes. John Peabody Harrington reported beaver on Zanja de Cota Creek on or before 1900. Taken together, these facts support the hypothesis that beaver ranged throughout Santa Barbara County, California. The Santa Ynez River beaver were likely trapped out until re-introduction in the 1940s by the California Department of Fish and Game.

The endangered Tidewater goby (Eucyclogobius newberryi) is also found in the creek's brackish coastal lagoon and several miles upstream in sections of stream impounded by beavers which provide ideal slow-moving water habitat for gobies.

== See also ==
- List of rivers in California
- California Fur Rush
