= Cachuma Lake =

Reservoir in Santa Barbara County, California

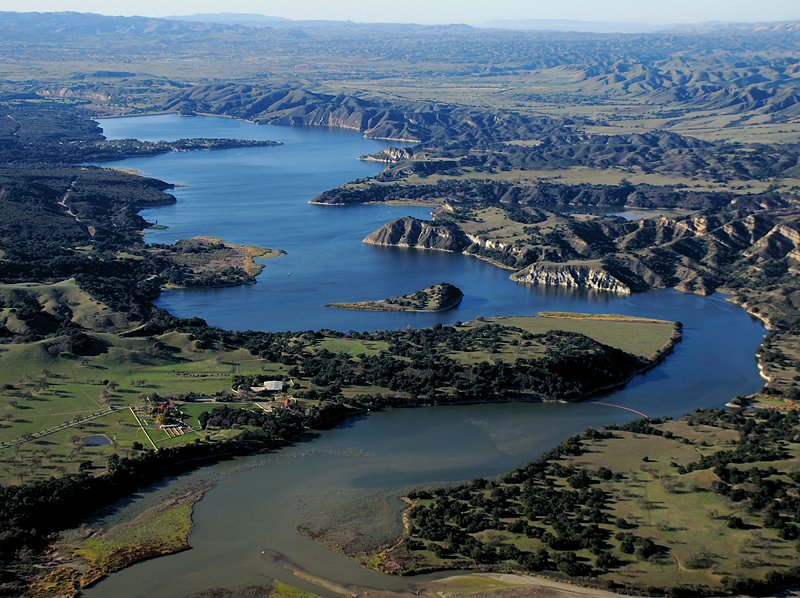

- Location within southern California Location within California Location within the United States
- Location: Los Padres National Forest; Santa Barbara County, California
- Coordinates: 34°35′12″N 119°58′52″W
- Type: Reservoir
- Primary inflows: California Aqueduct; Santa Ynez River
- Primary outflows: Santa Ynez River
- Basin countries: United States
- Surface area: 3,100 acres (1,300 ha)
- Average depth: 71 ft (22 m)
- Max. depth: 150 ft (46 m)
- Water volume: 205,000 acre⋅ft (253,000,000 m^{3})
- Shore length^{1}: 22.44 mi (36.11 km)
- Surface elevation: 753 ft (230 m)
- ^{1} Shore length is not a well-defined measure.

Aerial views of Cachuma Lake.

Cachuma Lake is a reservoir in the Santa Ynez Valley of central Santa Barbara County, California on the Santa Ynez River adjoining the north side of California State Route 154. The artificial lake was created by the construction of Bradbury Dam, a 201 ft (61 m) earth-fill structure built by the U.S. Bureau of Reclamation in 1953. Its surface area covers 3,100 acres (1,300 ha), with a maximum design capacity of 205,000 acre⋅ft (253,000,000 m^{3}), but it is currently limited to 188,000 acre⋅ft (232,000,000 m^{3}) due to sediment accumulation. The late-December 2022 and early-January 2023 storms dramatically raised the water level in the lake, from an average of 33% full to 100% full for the first time in 12 years.

== History ==
Built by the U.S. Bureau of Reclamation in 1953, the name "Cachuma" comes from a Chumash village that the Spanish spelled "Aquitsumu", from the Barbareño Chumash word aqitsu'm, meaning "sign".

The U.S. Bureau of Reclamation oversees the lake’s operations and maintenance. Five agencies that stretch from Santa Ynez to Carpinteria take water from Cachuma. The Central Coast Water Authority (CCWA) extension of the California Aqueduct completed in 1997, is a 30–39-inch diameter pipeline (76–99 cm) that travels 42 miles (68 km) from Vandenberg Space Force Base through Vandenberg Village, Lompoc, Buellton, and Solvang and terminates at Cachuma.

=== Water Levels ===
The water levels of the lake are highly variable, spilling in some years and receding to less than 10% of capacity in dry years. Drought conditions can cause shortage in water supplies, as did the 2011-17 drought.

In October 2016, the lake approached low levels not seen since the construction of Bradbury Dam. The lake level reached a minimum of 646.42 ft (197.03 m) on October 14, more than 106 ft (32 m) below the spillway elevation. At this time, the storage volume was only 14,057 acre-feet (17,339,000 m^{3}), approximately 7.3% of capacity.

In January and February 2017, a series of frequent rains raised the water level substantially. On one day, February 17, 2017, the lake rose by 25 feet (7.6 m) during the storm alone, followed by further increases from storm runoff. By the end of February 2017, the Lake had become 44.5% full, with a total volume of 85,979 acre-feet (106,054,000 m^{3}). The Lake's water level declined again during the 2017-18 water year, with the Lake receding to less than one-third of its capacity. By March 28, 2019, above-normal precipitation had restored Lake Cachuma to 78.0% of its capacity.

Despite an abnormally dry January and February 2020, a wet March and April brought the lake to 77% of capacity as of April 7, 2020.

Several consecutive atmospheric river storms coming in from the Pacific in late-December, 2022 and early-January, 2023 dramatically raised the water level in the lake, from an average of 33% full in late December, to nearly 100% full by January 15, 2023 for the first time in 12 years. Further storms in February resulted in flood warnings for portions of Lompoc close to the river due to the water being released from the dam.

== Climate ==
This region experiences hot and dry summers, with some average monthly temperatures above 71.6 °F (22.0 °C). According to the Köppen Climate Classification system, Cachuma Lake has a hot-summer Mediterranean climate, abbreviated Csa on climate maps.

Climate data for Cachuma Lake, California, 1991–2020 normals
Month	Jan	Feb	Mar	Apr	May	Jun	Jul	Aug	Sep	Oct	Nov	Dec	Year
Mean daily maximum °F (°C)	67.2 (19.6)	68.1 (20.1)	71.2 (21.8)	75.7 (24.3)	79.8 (26.6)	86.2 (30.1)	92.1 (33.4)	93.2 (34.0)	90.6 (32.6)	84.2 (29.0)	74.8 (23.8)	66.8 (19.3)	79.2 (26.2)
Daily mean °F (°C)	50.7 (10.4)	51.8 (11.0)	54.5 (12.5)	57.5 (14.2)	61.3 (16.3)	65.8 (18.8)	69.9 (21.1)	70.9 (21.6)	68.6 (20.3)	63.6 (17.6)	56.4 (13.6)	50.1 (10.1)	60.1 (15.6)
Mean daily minimum °F (°C)	34.2 (1.2)	35.4 (1.9)	37.8 (3.2)	39.3 (4.1)	42.8 (6.0)	45.3 (7.4)	47.8 (8.8)	48.5 (9.2)	46.7 (8.2)	44.1 (6.7)	38.0 (3.3)	33.4 (0.8)	41.1 (5.1)
Average precipitation inches (mm)	4.89 (124)	5.29 (134)	3.61 (92)	1.31 (33)	0.54 (14)	0.06 (1.5)	0.01 (0.25)	0.00 (0.00)	0.08 (2.0)	0.80 (20)	1.24 (31)	3.30 (84)	21.13 (535.75)
Source: NOAA

== Recreation ==
Santa Barbara County Parks offers cabin and yurt rentals, as well as RV, tent, and group camping. Gasoline and groceries are available at the general store. There is a full boat and kayak rental facility with a bait and tackle shop where fishing licenses can be purchased. The lake is stocked with rainbow trout throughout the winter season, and fishing is open all year from shore or boat. There are five miles of hiking trails within the park, and Los Padres National Forest trails close by.

A large campsite on the south shore of Cachuma Lake is administered by the Santa Barbara County Park's division of the Community Services Department.

The University of California, Santa Barbara rowing team regularly practices and races at Cachuma Lake and erected a permanent boathouse there just prior to the 1982-1983 school year. The lake is also a popular destination for viewing bald eagles from seasonal tour boats.

Body contact activities such as swimming, wading, or water skiing in Cachuma Lake have been restricted since the park opened in the 1950s, reasoning that the lake was a reservoir people depend upon for drinking water. In May 2011, the no body contact regulation was revised to allow human-powered recreational watercraft such as kayaks and canoes on the lake as well as allow dogs on boats and eliminate "incidental body contact" with the water as a punishable offense.

Solvang, California is approximately 10.5 mi (16.9 km) to the west of Lake Cachuma. The town of Santa Ynez, California is approximately 7.25 mi (11.67 km) to the west of Bradbury Dam.

== Natural history activities and programs ==
Santa Barbara County Parks offers a variety of natural programs including wildlife lake cruises, nature walks, junior ranger programs, campfire programs on summer weekends, and a family-oriented live animal event in the fall. School and community group environmental education field trips are available all year.

=== Neal Taylor Nature Center ===
Located in Santa Barbara, the Neal Taylor Nature Center, formerly the Cachuma Lake Nature Center, features exhibits and hands-on displays about the area's cultural and natural history, including local plants, animals, birds and geology. The nature center is open year-round and admission is free. The center offers youth and adult workshops and lectures as well as school and youth nature education programs in partnership with the Santa Barbara County Parks natural history programs.

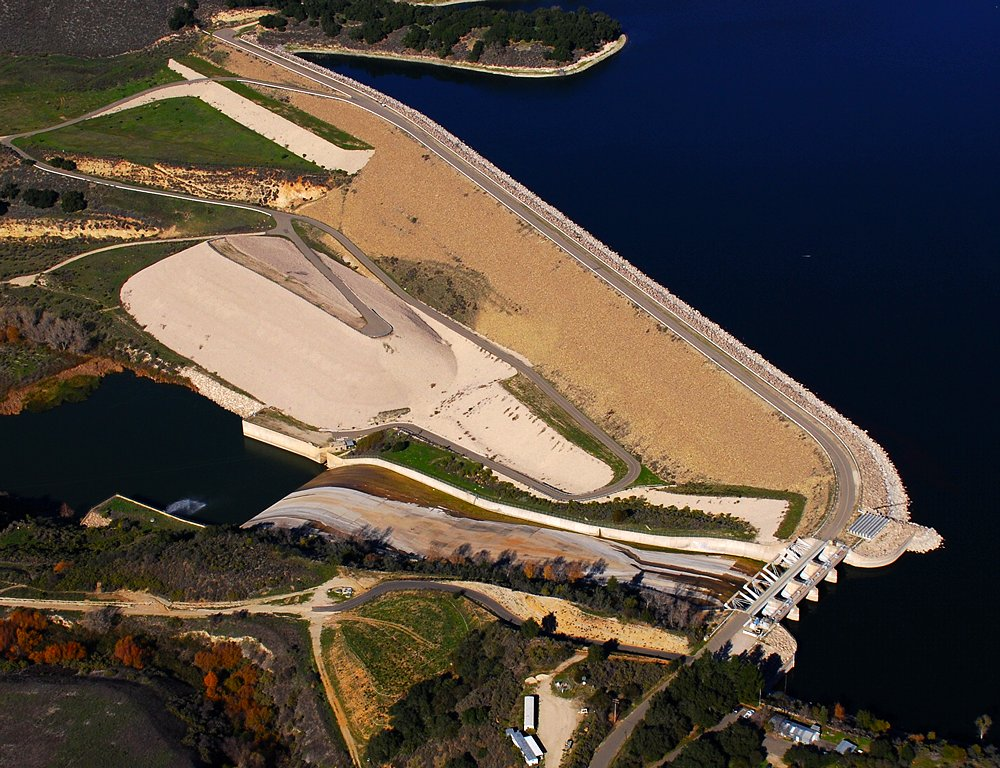
Bradbury Dam

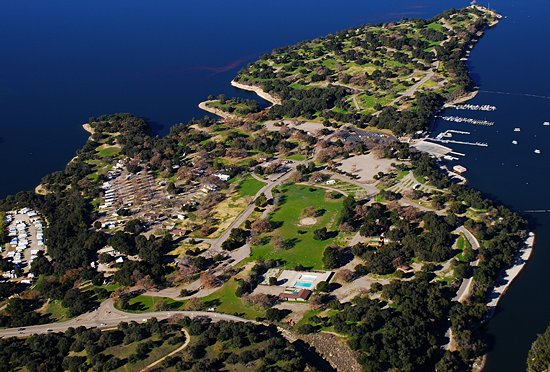
Campsite

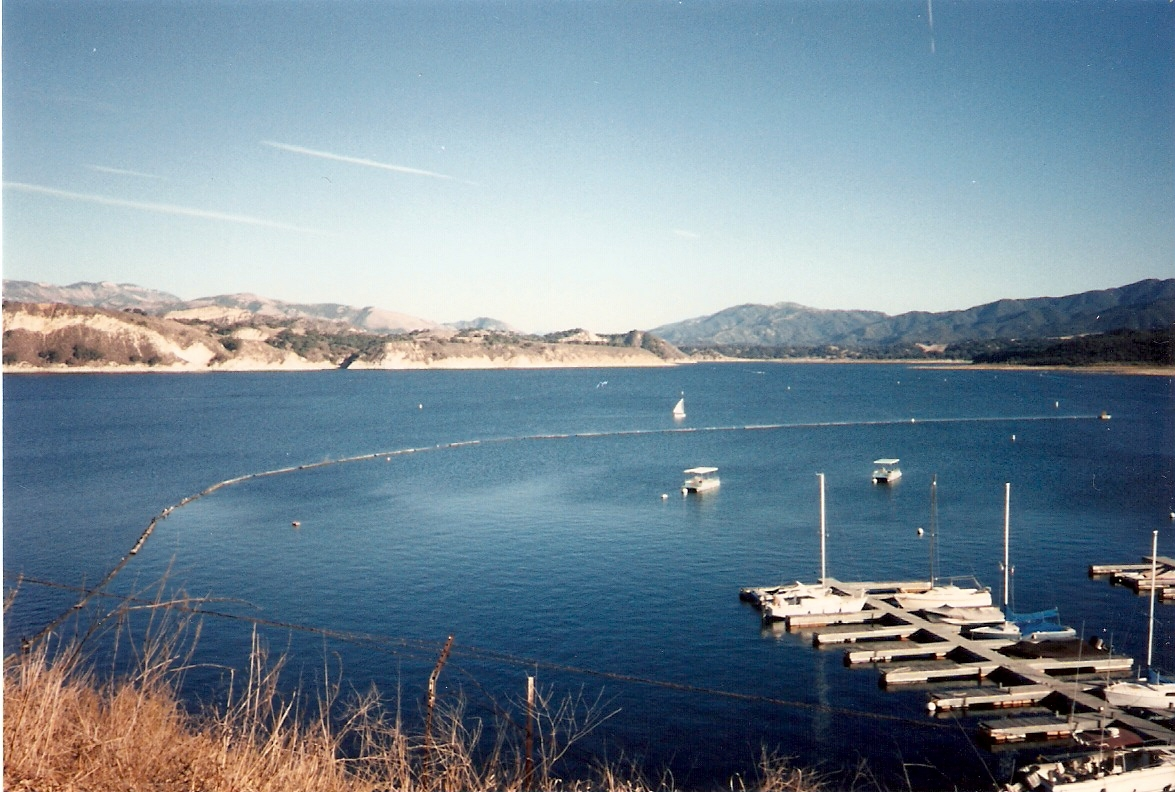
Dock & boats

== See also ==
- List of dams and reservoirs in California
- List of lakes in California
- List of largest reservoirs of California
